= Siege of Hachigata =

The siege of Hachigata is the name of two sieges of Hachigata Castle, a satellite castle of the Hōjō clan's Odawara Castle, which was besieged twice, both times in advance of an attack on Odawara.

- Siege of Hachigata (1568)
- Siege of Hachigata (1590)
