= Hachiōji Castle =

Castle in Tokyo

- 八王子城
- Hachiōji, Tokyo, Japan
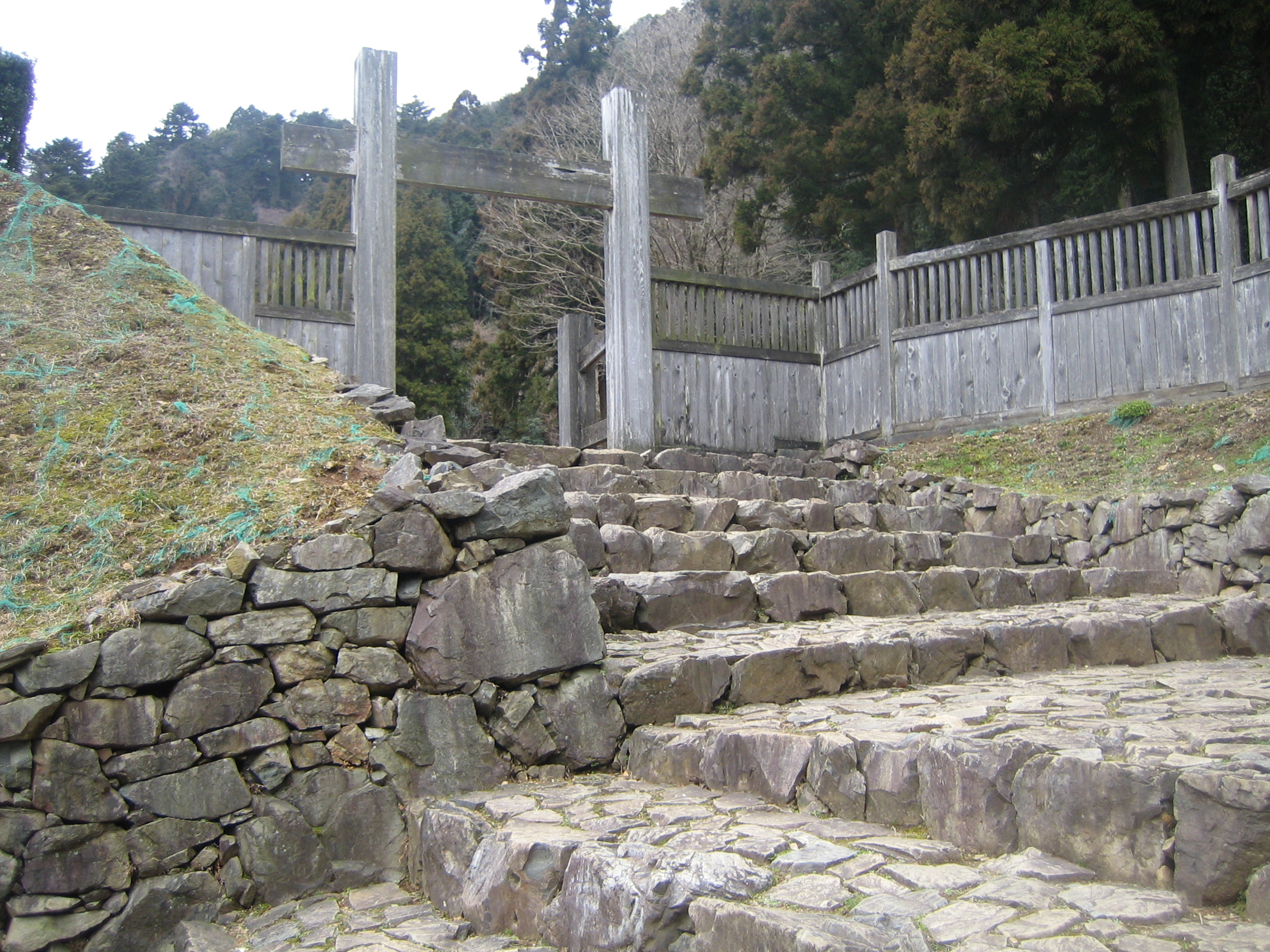
- Reconstructed gate and stone wall

Site information
- Type: Yamashiro-style Japanese castle
- Open to the public: yes
- Condition: ruins

Location
- Hachiōji Castle
- Location within Tokyo Location within Japan
- Coordinates: 35°39′10.56″N 139°15′7.61″E

Site history
- Built: 1587
- Built by: Late Hōjō clan
- In use: Sengoku period
- Demolished: 1590

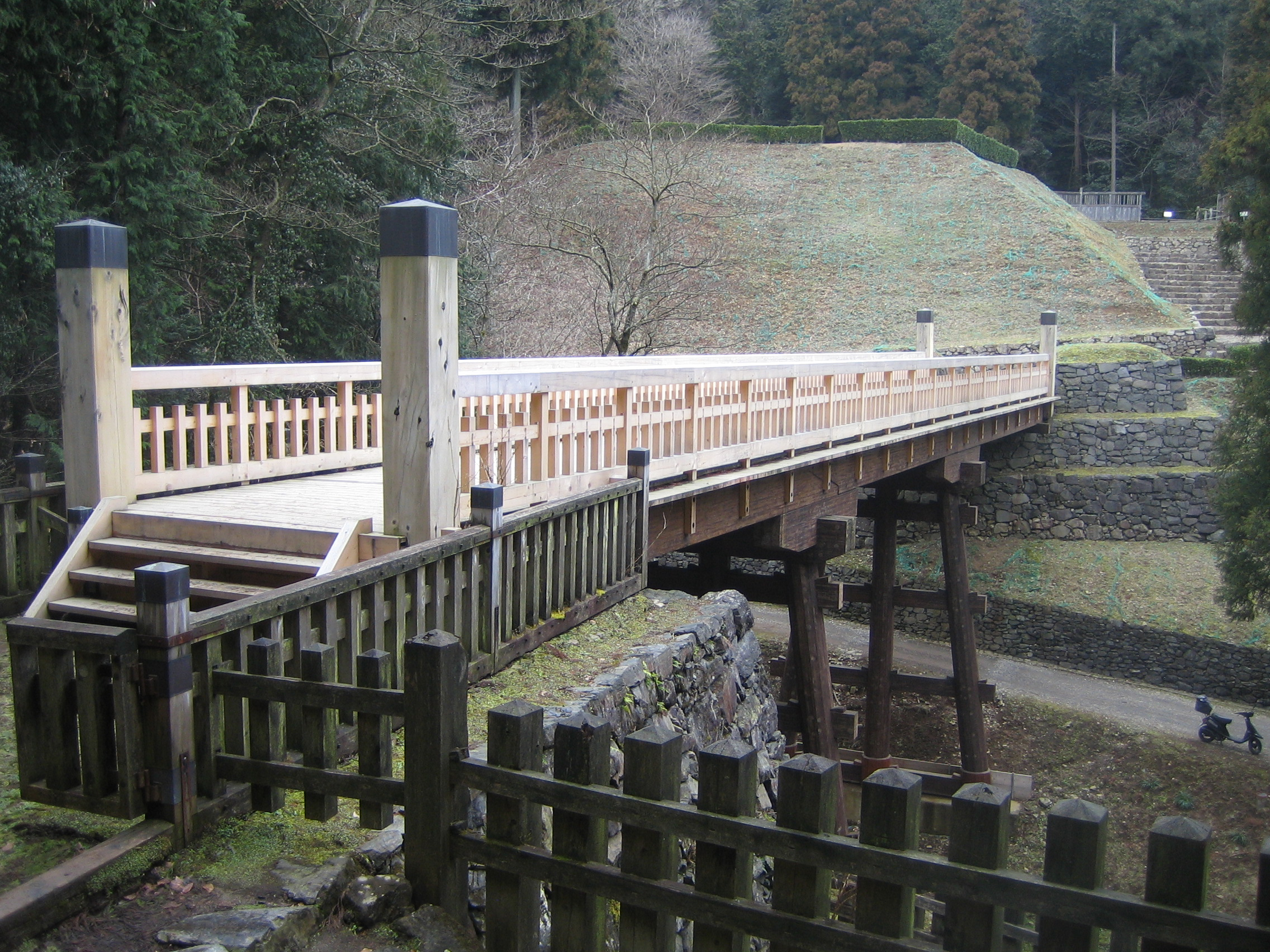
Reconstructed bridge

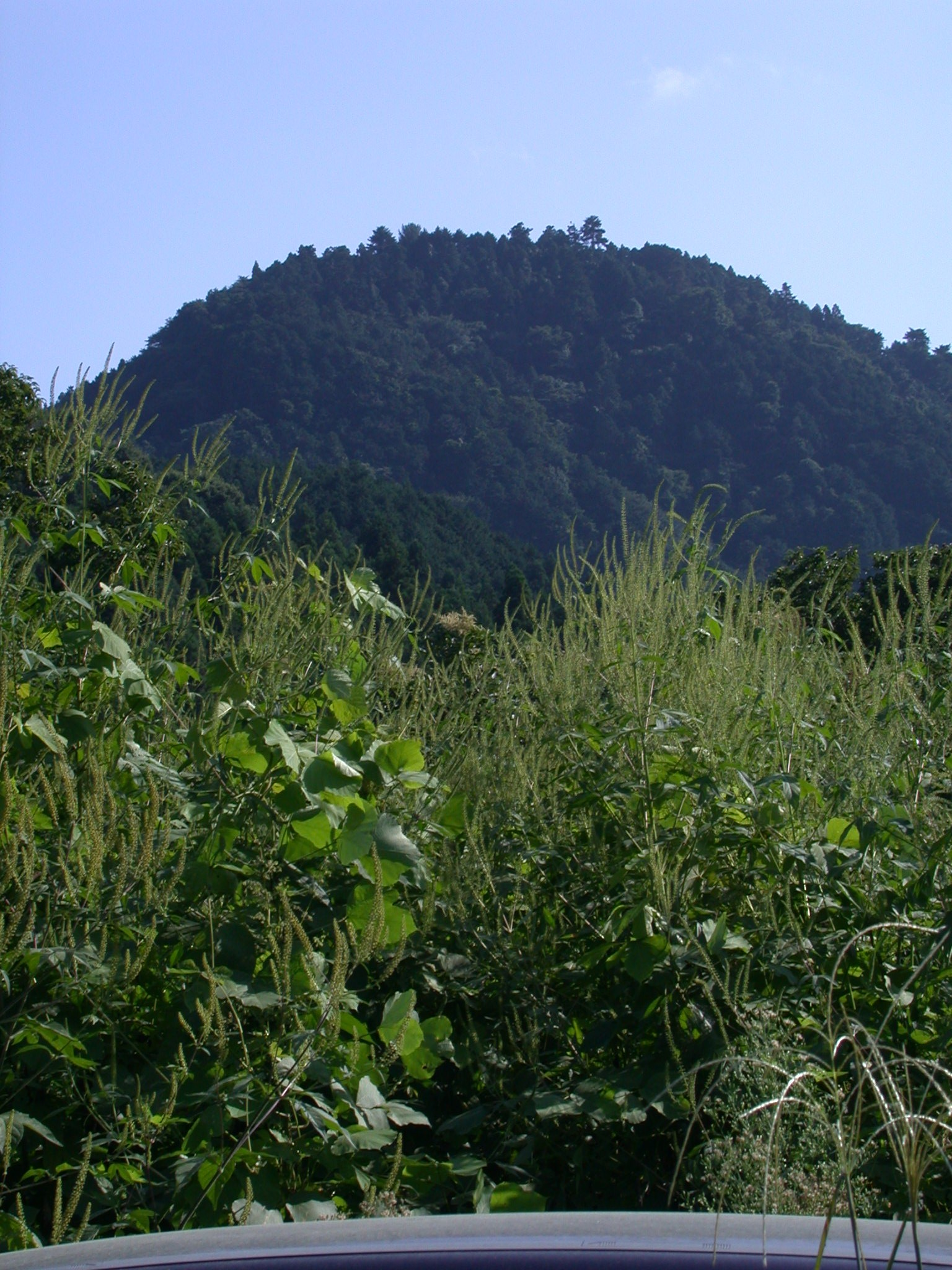
The mountain on which Hachiōji Castle is located

Hachiōji Castle (八王子城, Hachiōji-jō) was a Sengoku period Japanese castle, located in what is now the city of Hachiōji, Tokyo, in the Kantō region of Japan. Its ruins have been protected as a National Historic Site since 1951, with the area under protection extended in 2005.

It is called Hachioji because Hachioji Gongen a deity of the Gion faith. is enshrined there.

== Overview ==
Hachiōji Castle is located on the top of Mount Fukasawayama, about five kilometers southwest of central of modern center of Hachioji. The castle was situated to control both main route (via the Kobotoke Pass) and sub-route (Ange Pass) of the main road connecting Kai Province (modern Yamanashi prefecture) and Musashi Province (modern Saitama prefecture and Tokyo Metropolis).

The castle was built on a hillside and on the top of a mountain. Around the mountain, the outer defense line consisted of clay ramparts and dry moats built to utilize the natural contours of the slope. On the hillside was a large enclosure which housed the residence of the castellan, surrounded by smaller enclosures. The front wall and the route to the main gate were lined with stones as a show of authority, and a drawbridge was constructed over a dry moat in front on the main gate. On the hilltop was the inner bailey; however, it was small and had no significant defenses. On a neighboring hill, a 20-minute walk from the inner bailey was a secondary fortification with stone wall. This was intended to protect the main case from attack from the rear.

The structure of the castle is unbalanced, with the hillside structures built using stone and with good defenses, but other areas severely lacking, reflecting its incomplete nature.

== History ==
Hachiōji Castle was constructed in the 1570s by Hōjō Ujiteru, the younger brother of Hōjō Ujimasa, and effectively the military leader of the Late Hōjō clan. Ujiteru originally resided at Takiyama Castle on the Tama River approximately 15 kilometers to the north; however, that castle was built on a loose slope and had poor defenses. During an incursion by the Takeda clan in 1569, the invading Takeda army was able to penetrate the castle's outer defenses and it was only after a desperate struggle before the inner gates that the Hōjō were able to drive the Takeda back. This impressed strongly on Hōjō Ujiteru the need to have a stronger castle.

While the Hachiōji Castle was still being constructed, the Takeda clan was destroyed in 1582 by an alliance between Oda Nobunaga and Tokugawa Ieyasu, both of whom were also hostile to the Hōjō. Ujiteru pushed forward with construction and was able to relocate his seat to Hachiōji Castle by 1587. In 1590, Toyotomi Hideyoshi marched a huge army against the Hōjō, who had refused to pledge fealty to him. Hōjō Ujiteru left only 1,300 men behind at Hachiōji Castle when he marched in an unsuccessful attempt to lift the Siege of Odawara. Hideyoshi sent a detached force of 30,000 soldiers led by Maeda Toshiie, and Uesugi Kagekatsu through Usui Pass. This army captured the Hōjō strongholds one-by-one: Matsuida Castle, Minowa Castle, Maebashi Castle, Matsuyama Castle and Hachigata Castle before finally arriving at Hachioji Castle in June 1590. In early morning of June 23, Toyotomi army of 15,000 men attacked, and Hachiōji Castle was captured before the end of the day. Tokugawa Ieyasu later commanded that the castle be destroyed. For years afterwards, the site remained abandoned because it was believed to be haunted.

== Current situation ==
The castle now lies in ruins, although in 1990 some stone walls, a bridge across a moat, and the entrance to the lord's palace were reconstructed. The site is located a 15-minute walk from the "Reienmae/Hachiojijoseki" bus stop on the Nishi Tokyo Bus from Takao Station.

Around 1945, the area around the castle site except near the summit was a bald mountain due to timber felling during the war. After World War II, hinoki cypress trees were planted. In 1951 the site of Hachiōji Castle was proclaimed a National Historic Site and archaeological excavation and maintenance work began. In 2004, the Ken-Ō Expressway was constructed with a tunnel running directly under the western end of the mountain on which the castle is located.

Hachiōji Castle was listed as one of Japan's Top 100 Castles by the Japan Castle Foundation in 2006.

== See also ==
- List of Historic Sites of Japan (Tōkyō)
- Takiyama Castle : Hōjō Ujiteru's former home castle

== Literature ==
- Schmorleitz, Morton S. (1974). Castles in Japan. Tokyo: Charles E. Tuttle Co. pp. 144–145. ISBN 0-8048-1102-4.
- De Lange, William (2021). An Encyclopedia of Japanese Castles. Groningen: Toyo Press. p. 600. ISBN 978-9492722300.
- Motoo, Hinago (1986). Japanese Castles. Tokyo: Kodansha. p. 200 pages. ISBN 0-87011-766-1.
- Mitchelhill, Jennifer (2004). Castles of the Samurai: Power and Beauty. Tokyo: Kodansha. p. 112 pages. ISBN 4-7700-2954-3.
- Turnbull, Stephen (2003). Japanese Castles 1540-1640. Osprey Publishing. p. 64 pages. ISBN 1-84176-429-9.
