= 100 Fine Castles of Japan =

List of cultural and historical castles in Japan

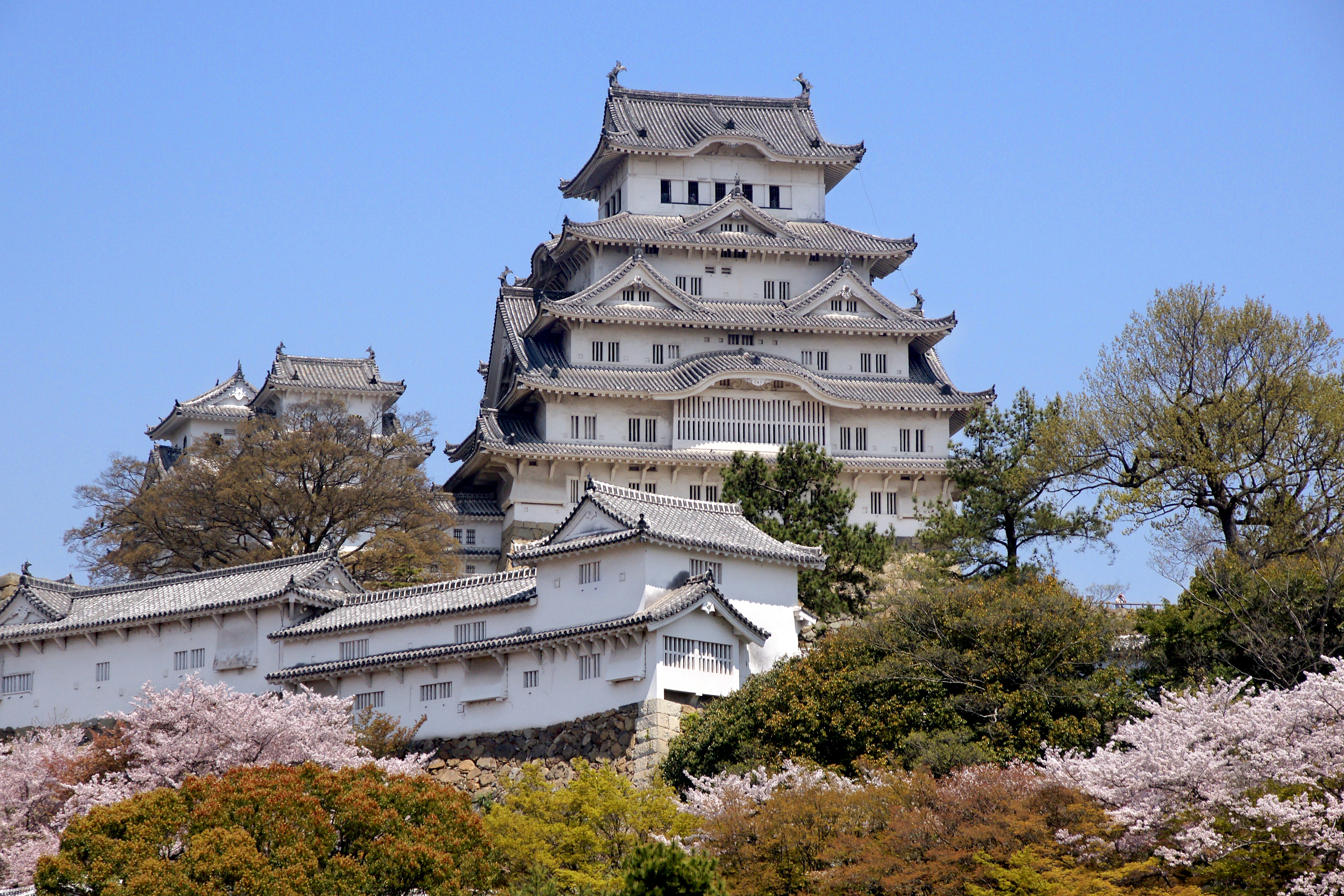
Himeji Castle

The castles in Top 100 Japanese Castles or 100 Fine Castles of Japan (日本百名城, Nihon Hyaku-Meijō) were chosen based on their significance in culture, history, and in their regions by the Japanese Castle Association (日本城郭協会, Nihon Jōkaku Kyōkai) in 2006.

In 2017, the Japanese Castle Association created an additional finest 100 castles list as Continued Top 100 Japanese Castles.

== Hokkaidō ==
Name	Prefecture	City	Year completed	Built by	Photo
Nemuro Peninsula Chashi Site 根室半島チャシ跡群	Hokkaido	Nemuro	From the 16C to the 18C	Ainu people アイヌ民族	
Goryōkaku 五稜郭	Hokkaido	Hakodate	1866	Tokugawa shogunate 徳川軍和新政府軍	
Matsumae Castle 松前城	Hokkaido	Matsumae	1606	Matsumae Takahiro 松前 崇広	

== Tōhoku region ==
Name	Prefecture	City	Year completed	Built by	Photo
Hirosaki Castle 弘前城	Aomori	Hirosaki	1611	Tsugaru Tamenobu 津軽為信; Tsugaru Nobuhira 津軽信枚	
Ne Castle 根城	Aomori	Hachinohe	1334	Moroyuki Nanbu 南部師行	
Morioka Castle 盛岡城	Iwate	Morioka	1598	Nanbu Nobunao 南部信直	
Sendai Castle 仙台城	Miyagi	Sendai	1601	Date Masamune 伊達政宗	
Taga Fort 多賀城	Miyagi	Tagajō	724	Ōno no Azumabito 小野東人	
Kubota Castle 久保田城	Akita	Akita	1604	Satake Yoshinobu 佐竹義宣	
Yamagata Castle 山形城	Yamagata	Yamagata	1356	Shiba Kaneyori 斯波 兼頼	
Nihonmatsu Castle 二本松城	Fukushima	Nihonmatsu	Muromachi period	Hatakeyama Mitsuyasu	
Tsuruga Castle 鶴ヶ城	Fukushima	Aizuwakamatsu	1384	Ashina Naomori 蘆名直盛	
Komine Castle 小峰城	Fukushima	Shirakawa	1340	Yūki Chikatomo	

== Kantō and Kōshin'etsu region ==
Name	Prefecture	City	Year completed	Built by	Photo
Mito Castle 水戸城	Ibaraki	Mito	1198	Baba Sukemoto	
Banna-ji 鑁阿寺	Tochigi	Ashikaga	1196	Minamoto no Yoshiyasu 源義康	
Minowa Castle 箕輪城	Gunma	Takasaki	1512	Nagano Narihisa	
Kanayama Castle 金山城	Gunma	Ōta	1469	Iwamatsu Iezumi 岩松家純	
Hachigata Castle 鉢形城	Saitama	Yorii	1476	Nagao Kageharu 長尾景春	
Kawagoe Castle 川越城	Saitama	Kawagoe	1457	Uesugi Mochitomo 上杉持朝	
Sakura Castle 佐倉城	Chiba	Sakura	Tenbun era	Kashima Chikamiki	
Edo Castle 江戸城	Tokyo	Chiyoda	1457	Ōta Dōkan 太田道灌	
Hachiōji Castle 八王子城	Tokyo	Hachiōji	1587	Hōjō Ujiteru 北条氏照	
Odawara Castle 小田原城	Kanagawa	Odawara	1633	Ōmori Yoriharu 大森頼春	
Tsutsujigasaki Castle 躑躅ヶ崎館	Yamanashi	Kōfu	1519	Takeda Nobutora 武田信虎	
Kōfu Castle 甲府城	Yamanashi	Kōfu	1583	Tokugawa Ieyasu 徳川家康	
Matsushiro Castle 松代城	Nagano	Nagano	1560	Takeda Shingen 武田信玄	
Ueda Castle 上田城	Nagano	Ueda	1583	Sanada Masayuki 真田昌幸	
Komoro Castle 小諸城	Nagano	Komoro	1554	Takeda Shingen 武田信玄	
Matsumoto Castle 松本城	Nagano	Matsumoto	1504	Shimadachi Sadanaga	
Takatō Castle 高遠城	Nagano	Ina	?	?	
Shibata Castle 新発田城	Niigata	Shibata	1654?	Shibata clan?	
Kasugayama Castle 春日山城	Niigata	Jōetsu	Nanboku-chō period	Nagao clan Uesugi clan	

== Hokuriku region ==
Name	Prefecture	City	Year completed	Built by	Photo
Takaoka Castle 高岡城	Toyama	Takaoka	1609	Maeda Toshinaga	
Nanao Castle 七尾城	Ishikawa	Nanao	1429	Hatakeyama Mitsunori	
Kanazawa Castle 金沢城	Ishikawa	Kanazawa	1580	Sakuma Morimasa	
Maruoka Castle 丸岡城	Fukui	Sakai	1576	Shibata Katsutoyo	
Ichijōdani Castle 一乗谷城	Fukui	Fukui	Nanboku-chō period	Asakura clan	

== Tōkai region ==
Name	Prefecture	City	Year completed	Built by	Photo
Iwamura Castle 岩村城	Gifu	Ena	1221	Tōyama Kagetomo	
Gifu Castle 岐阜城	Gifu	Gifu	1201	Nikaidō Yukimasa	
Yamanaka Castle 山中城	Shizuoka	Mishima	1570	Hōjō Ujiyasu	
Sunpu Castle 駿府城	Shizuoka	Shizuoka	1585	Tokugawa Ieyasu	
Kakegawa Castle 掛川城	Shizuoka	Kakegawa	1487	Asahina Yasuhiro	
Inuyama Castle 犬山城	Aichi	Inuyama	1469	Oda Hirochika	
Nagoya Castle 名古屋城	Aichi	Nagoya	1609	Tokugawa Ieyasu	
Okazaki Castle 岡崎城	Aichi	Okazaki	1452?	Saigō clan	
Nagashino Castle 長篠城	Aichi	Shinshiro	1508	Suganuma Motonari	
Iga Ueno Castle 伊賀上野城	Mie	Iga	1585	Tsutsui Sadatsugu	
Matsusaka Castle 松阪城	Mie	Matsusaka	1588	Gamō Ujisato	

== Kansai region ==
Name	Prefecture	City	Year completed	Built by	Photo
Odani Castle 小谷城	Shiga	Kohoku	1516	Azai Sukemasa	
Hikone Castle 彦根城	Shiga	Hikone	1622	Ii Naokatsu	
Azuchi Castle 安土城	Shiga	Ōmihachiman	1576	Oda Nobunaga	
Kannonji Castle 観音寺城	Shiga	Ōmihachiman	1487	Rokkaku Ujiyori	
Nijō Castle 二条城	Kyoto	Kyoto	1603	Tokugawa Ieyasu	
Osaka Castle 大坂城	Osaka	Osaka	1583	Toyotomi Hideyoshi	
Chihaya Castle 千早城	Osaka	Chihayaakasaka	1332	Kusunoki Masashige	
Takeda Castle 竹田城	Hyōgo	Asago	1431	Yamana Sōzen	
Sasayama Castle 篠山城	Hyōgo	Sasayama	1609	Tokugawa Ieyasu	
Akashi Castle 明石城	Hyōgo	Akashi	1618	Ogasawara Tadazane	
Himeji Castle 姫路城	Hyōgo	Himeji	1346	Akamatsu Sadanori	
Akō Castle 赤穂城	Hyōgo	Akō	1483	Oka Mitsuhiro	
Takatori Castle 高取城	Nara	Takatori	1332	Ochi Kunizumi	
Wakayama Castle 和歌山城	Wakayama	Wakayama	1586	Toyotomi Hidenaga	

== Chūgoku region ==
Name	Prefecture	City	Year completed	Built by	Photo
Tottori Castle 鳥取城	Tottori	Tottori	1555	Yamana clan	
Matsue Castle 松江城	Shimane	Matsue	1611	Horio Tadauji	
Gassantoda Castle 月山富田城	Shimane	Yasugi	1185?	Sasaki Yoshikiyo?	
Tsuwano Castle 津和野城	Shimane	Tsuwano	1295	Yoshimi Yoriyuki	
Tsuyama Castle 津山城	Okayama	Tsuyama	1444	Yamashina Tadamasa	
Bitchū Matsuyama Castle 備中松山城	Okayama	Takahashi	1240	Akiba Shigenobu	
Ki castle 鬼ノ城	Okayama	Sōja	7C?	Yamato court?	
Okayama Castle 岡山城	Okayama	Okayama	1369	Uwagami Takanao	
Fukuyama Castle 福山城	Hiroshima	Fukuyama	1622	Mizuno Katsunari	
Yoshida-Kōriyama Castle 吉田郡山城	Hiroshima	Akitakata	1336	Mōri Tokichika	
Hiroshima Castle 広島城	Hiroshima	Hiroshima	1589	Mōri Terumoto	
Iwakuni Castle 岩国城	Yamaguchi	Iwakuni	1601	Kikkawa Hiroie	
Hagi Castle 萩城	Yamaguchi	Hagi	1604	Mōri Terumoto	

== Shikoku region ==
Name	Prefecture	City	Year completed	Built by	Photo
Tokushima Castle 徳島城	Tokushima	Tokushima	1585	Hachisuka Iemasa	
Takamatsu Castle 高松城	Kagawa	Takamatsu	1590	Ikoma Chikamasa	
Marugame Castle 丸亀城	Kagawa	Marugame	Muromachi period	Nara Motoyasu	
Imabari Castle 今治城	Ehime	Imabari	1602	Tōdō Takatora	
Matsuyama Castle 松山城	Ehime	Matsuyama	1602	Katō Yoshiaki	
Yuzuki Castle 湯築城	Ehime	Matsuyama	14C	Kōno clan	
Ōzu Castle 大洲城	Ehime	Ōzu	1331	Utsunomiya Toyofusa	
Uwajima Castle 宇和島城	Ehime	Uwajima	1586	Tachibana no Tōyasu	
Kōchi Castle 高知城	Kōchi	Kōchi	1603	Yamauchi Kazutoyo	

== Kyūshū region ==
Name	Prefecture	City	Year completed	Built by	Photo
Fukuoka Castle 福岡城	Fukuoka	Fukuoka	1601	Kuroda Nagamasa	
Ōno Castle (Chikuzen Province) 大野城	Fukuoka	Ōnojō	665	?	
Nagoya Castle 名護屋城	Saga	Karatsu	1591	Toyotomi Hideyoshi	
Yoshinogari site 吉野ヶ里遺跡	Saga	Yoshinogari; Kanzaki	Yayoi period	?	
Saga Castle 佐賀城	Saga	Saga	1602	Nabeshima clan	
Hirado Castle 平戸城	Nagasaki	Hirado	1599	Matsura Shigenobu	
Shimabara Castle 島原城	Nagasaki	Shimabara	1624	Matsukura Shigemasa	
Kumamoto Castle 熊本城	Kumamoto	Kumamoto	1467	Ideta Hidenobu	
Hitoyoshi Castle 人吉城	Kumamoto	Hitoyoshi	Genkyū era	Sagara Nagayori	
Funai Castle 府内城	Ōita	Ōita	1597	Fukuhara Nagataka	
Oka Castle 岡城 (豊後国)	Ōita	Taketa	1185	Ogata Koreyoshi	
Obi Castle 飫肥城	Miyazaki	Nichinan	Sengoku period	Tsuchimochi clan	
Kagoshima Castle 鹿児島城	Kagoshima	Kagoshima	1602	Shimazu Iehisa	

== Okinawa region ==
Name	Prefecture	City	Year completed	Built by	Photo
Nakijin Castle 今帰仁城	Okinawa	Nakijin	13C?	Haniji?	
Nakagusuku Castle 中城城	Okinawa	Kitanakagusuku	1440	Gosamaru	
Shuri Castle 首里城	Okinawa	Naha	14C?	King of Chūzan	

== See also ==
- List of castles in Japan
- List of National Treasures of Japan (castles)
- Continued Top 100 Japanese Castles
