= Izu Suigun =

The Izu Suigun (Japanese: 伊豆水軍, Izu suigun) was a regional naval fleet (suigun) based in the Izu Peninsula of Japan. Owing to its later incorporation into the later Hōjō clan, it was also known as the Hojo suigun. The Izu suigun fought many battles with the Takeda suigun in Suruga Bay before being defeated by the Toyotomi navy during the Siege of Odowara in 1590 and subsequently disbanded.

== Description ==
The main composition of the Izu suigun were local lords during the time of Hōjō Sōun's invasion of the Izu peninsula, including the Suzuki Clan, the Matsushita Clan, the Tominaga Clan, and more, as well as additional naval power offered by the Miura and Kajiwara clans of Kumano. Based at Nagahama Castle, the Izu suigun often confronted the Takeda and Imagawa suiguns. At the Battle of Suruga Bay on March 15, 1580, the Izu navy deployed large atakebune with cannons. The Takeda responded by deploying smaller warships and used the sandbanks as earthworks, bombarding the Izu ships from both land and water, before both were forced to withdraw at nightfall.

Izu ship captains Kajiwara Kagemune and Yasuhide Shimizu each successfully defended Nagahama and Shimoda castle by 1590. However, when the Toyotomi suigun threatened to invade, the Shimizu occupied Shimoda castle. Kajiwara Kagemune attempted and failed to launch a naval attack, and Shimoda Castle was handed over after a siege of 50 days. Most of the Izu suigun disbanded shortly afterward, and most sailors returned to land, though Kajiwara Kagemune fled to Mount Kōya.

=== Affiliated clans ===
- Kajiwara Clan (Lord of Nagahama Castle)
- Shimizu Clan (Lord of Shimoda Castle)
- Suzuki Clan of Izu (Lord of Eri Castle)
- Tominaga Clan
- Matsushita Clan

== See also ==
- Izu Province
- Suigun
