= Hōjō Ujikuni =

- 北条 氏邦
- Born: 1541; Sagami Province, Japan
- Died: September 19, 1597 (aged 55–56); Sagami Province, Japan
- Relatives: Hōjō Ujiyasu (father); Hōjō Ujimasa (brother); Hōjō Ujiteru (brother); Hōjō Ujinori (brother); Uesugi Kagetora (brother)
- Military career
- Allegiance: Later Hōjō clan
- Commands: Hachigata Castle
- Conflicts: Siege of Hachigata (1568); Battle of Mimasetoge (1569); Battle of Kanagawa (1582); Siege of Hachigata (1590); Siege of Odawara (1590)

Hōjō Ujikuni (北条 氏邦; 1541 – September 19, 1597) was a samurai of the Sengoku period, and the third son of Hōjō Ujiyasu. Ujikuni was a high-ranking commander in the invasion of Kozuke Province, Kōzuke was contested between the later Hōjō clan, the Takeda and the Uesugi clans.

He was also the castellan (castle lord) in command of Hachigata Castle in Musashi province, which came under siege twice in 1568 by Takeda Shingen and 1590 by Toyotomi Hideyoshi.

In 1569, along with Hojo Ujiteru, failed to stop Takeda Shingen's retreat in the Battle of Mimasetoge.

Following the sudden death of Oda Nobunaga in 1582, He and Hojo Ujinao took the advantage of the situation to launch a certain attack at Kanagawa.

When Siege of Odawara began, he was defending Hachigata Castle but surrounded by Toyotomi's large army、then he decided to surrender. Later he became a vassal of Maeda Toshiie.

== Bibliography ==
- Turnbull, Stephen (1998). The Samurai Sourcebook. London: Cassell & Co.
- Turnbull, Stephen (2002). War in Japan: 1467-1615. Oxford: Osprey Publishing.
