= Battle of Kannagawa =

- Part of the Sengoku period
Date	June 16 – June 19, 1582
Location	border between Kozuke and Musashi provinces, Japan 36°16′10″N 139°06′59″E
Result	Hōjō victory

Belligerents
Hōjō forces	Oda forces

Commanders and leaders
Hōjō Ujinao; Hōjō Ujikuni	Takigawa Kazumasu

Strength
55,000	18,000

Casualties and losses
300	2,000 – 4,000
- Location within Japan

The Battle of Kannagawa (神流川の戦い, Kannagawa no Tatakai) took place during the Sengoku period (16th century) of Japanese history, between Oda and Hōjō forces.

== History ==
Following the sudden death of Oda Nobunaga, the Hōjō family soon took advantage of the situation and launched an attack on Oda clan territory.

Hojo Ujimasa's forces led by Ujinao and Ujikuni attack Oda Nobunaga's senior retainer, Takigawa Kazumasu, who had received territories after the defeat of Takeda Katsuyori the same year in 1582.

On the border between the Kōzuke and Musashi provinces, Kazumasu faced off against the Hōjō forces at Kanegawa. Kazumasu had 18,000 troops, while the Hōjō wielded 55,000, Kazumasu's defeat and retreated to Nagashima.

On July 7, as the Oda clan learned of the defeat of Takigawa Kazumasu by the Hōjō clan at this battle, Toyotomi Hideyoshi sent a letter to Tokugawa Ieyasu to give him authorization to lead military operation to secure the provinces of Kai and Shinano from the Hōjō and Uesugi clans. (Note: Ieyasu's position and actions here are not those of an independent feudal lord, but as a feudal lord under the Oda regime, with the aim of defeating the Hojo clan)
