= Setagaya Castle =

Castle in Tokyo, Japan

- 世田谷城
- Setagaya, Tokyo, Japan
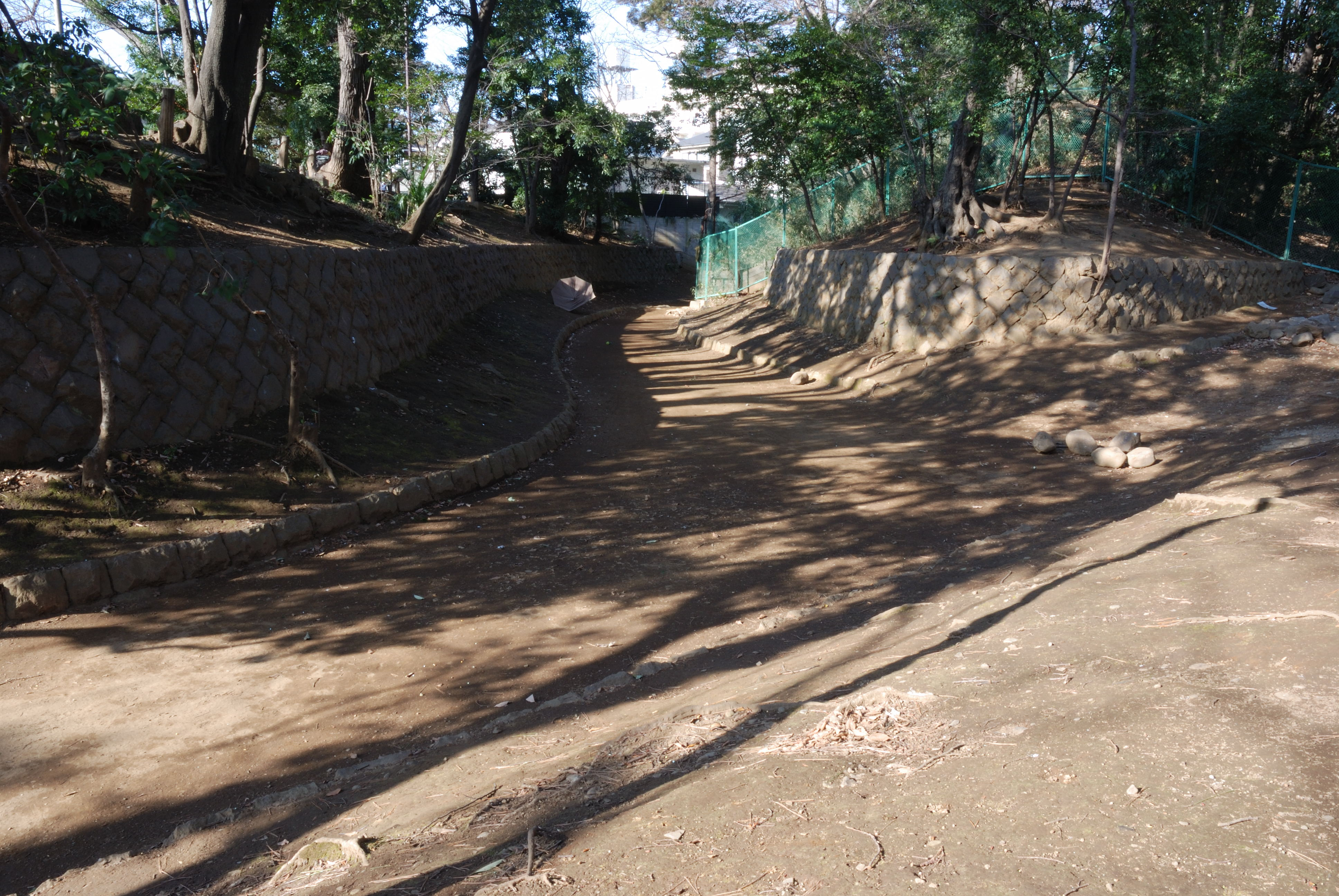
- Setagaya Castle

Site information
- Type: Hirajiro-style castle
- Owner: Kira clan, Later Hōjō clan
- Condition: ruins

Site history
- Built: Ōei Period
- Built by: Kira clan
- Demolished: 1590

Setagaya Castle (世田谷城, Setagaya-jō) is the remains of a castle structure in Setagaya, Tokyo, Japan. Its ruins have been protected as a Prefectural Historic Sites.

It is believed that the castle was constructed by the Kira clan in the Ōei Period. Setagaya castle was a mere fortified residence when the castle was built but was expanded and fortified by Kira Naritaka in the Sengoku period.

Later, Setagaya castle became one of the castles under the direct control of the Later Hōjō clan. The castle was demolished soon after the Siege of Odawara in 1590. Setagaya Castle park and Gōtoku-ji Temple are on site.

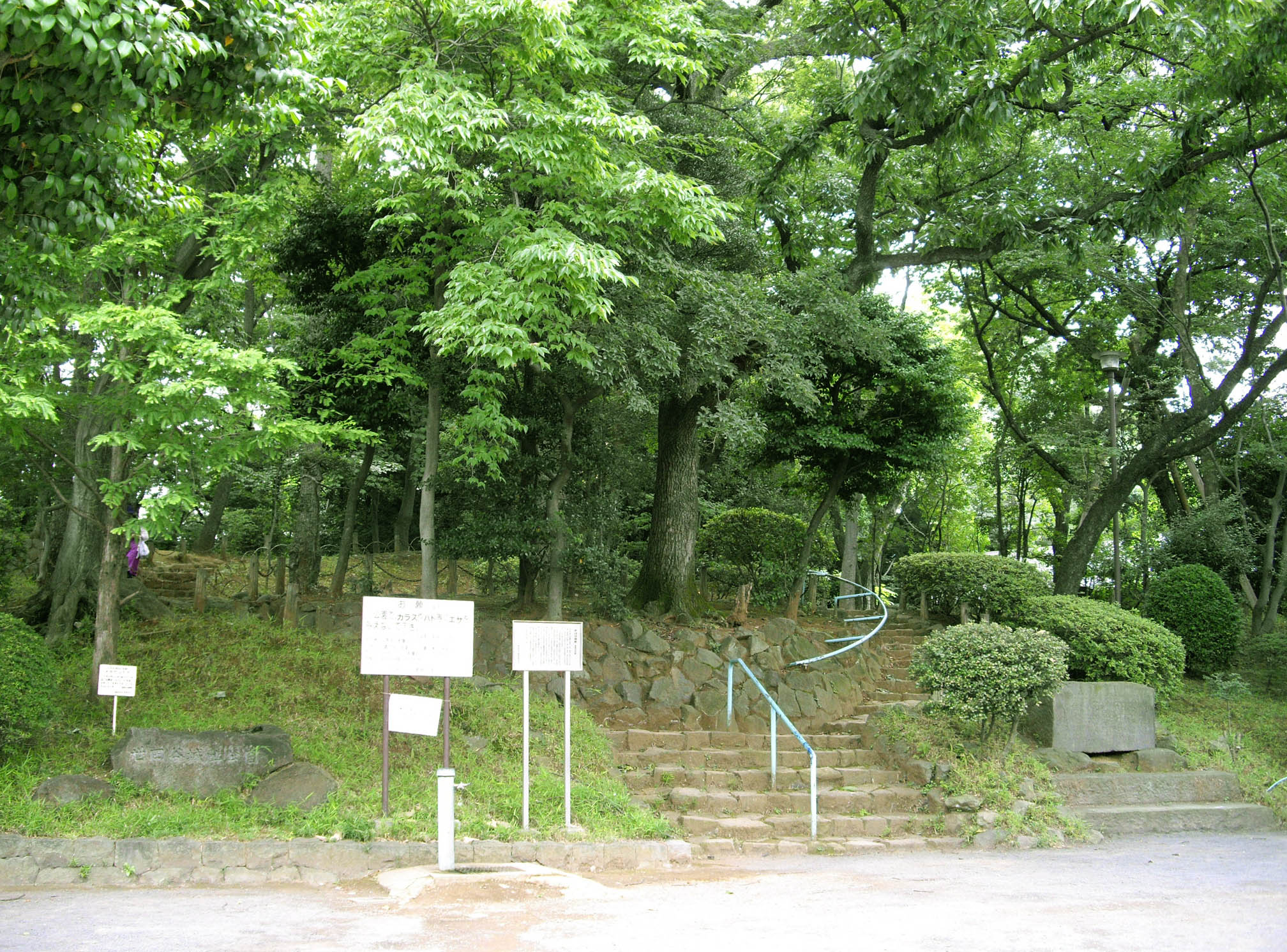
Setagaya Castle Park
