= Battle of Mimasetoge =

1569 battle in Japan

Coordinates: 35°32′06″N 139°17′40″E

Battle of Mimasetōge
- Part of the Sengoku period
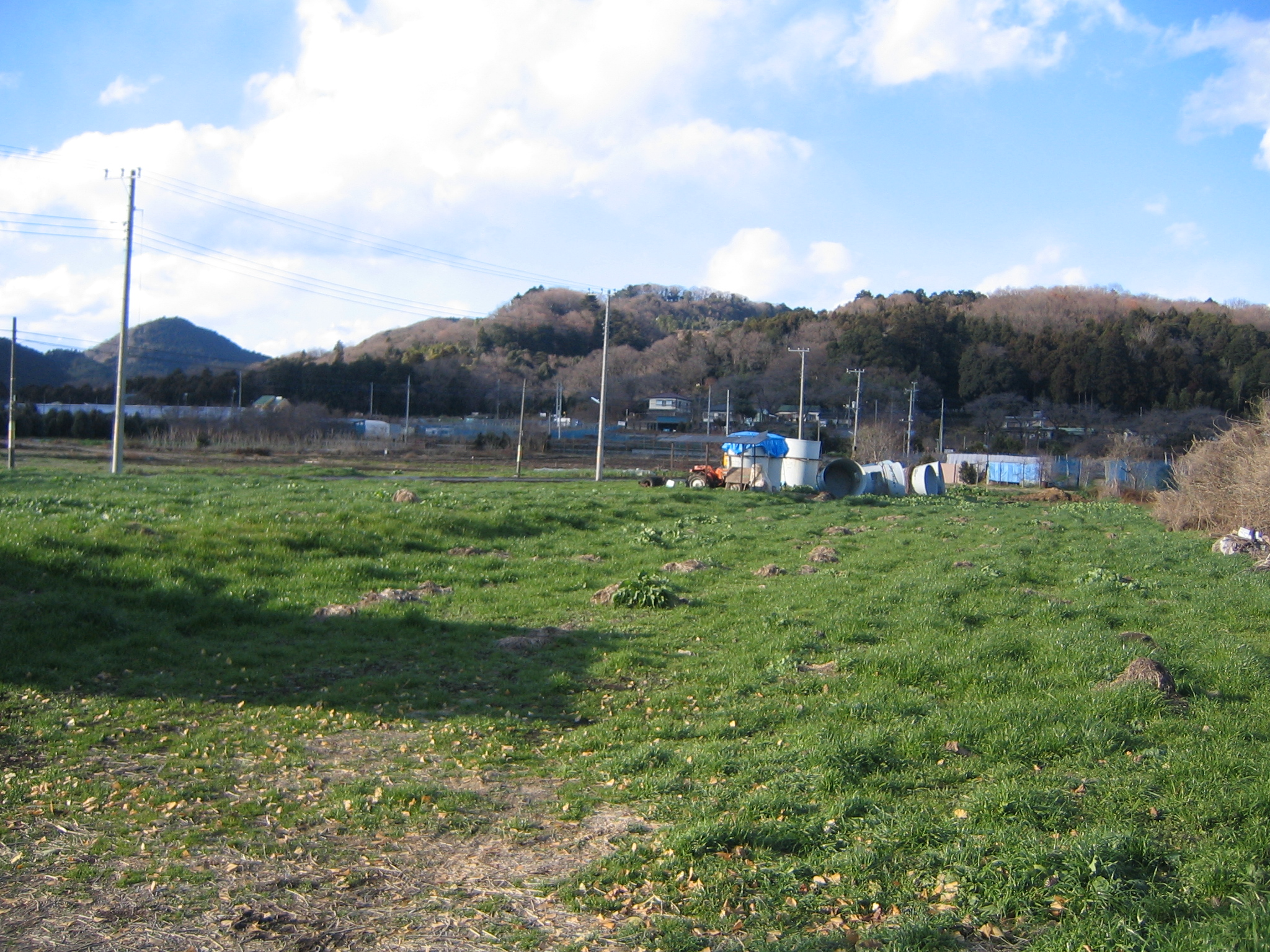
- The battlefield at present
| Date | 1569 |
| Location | Mimase Pass, Sagami Province |
| Result | Hōjō retreat; Successful Takeda withdrawal |

Belligerents
| forces of Takeda Shingen | forces of Hōjō Ujiyasu |

Commanders and leaders
| Takeda Shingen; Baba Nobuharu; Yamagata Masakage; Hara Masatane; Obata Masamori; Sanada Masayuki | Hōjō Ujiteru; Hōjō Ujikuni |

Strength
| 10,000 | 20,000 |

Casualties and losses
| 900 dead | 3,200 dead |

The Battle of Mimasetōge (三増峠の戦い) was the Hōjō's attack on the Takeda army, which took place at Mimase Pass in 1569, as the forces of Takeda Shingen withdrew after repeated failed sieges of the Hōjō clan's Odawara Castle in Kanagawa Prefecture of Japan.

The Hōjō forces, led by the brothers Ujiteru and Ujikuni, lay in wait for Takeda Shingen in the pass of Mimase. The Takeda vanguard, which included Baba Nobuharu, was hard-pressed. Shingen himself led the Takeda main body.

The battle turned in favor of the Takeda when Yamagata Masakage launched a furious counterattack, inflicting heavy casualties on the Hōjō and forced the Hōjō army to retreat north, allowing the Takeda return to Kai — leaving behind some 900 dead.

== See also ==
- Myōki
