= Matsuda Norihide =

Japanese samurai

- 松田 憲秀
- Died: July 17, 1590; Odawara castle
- Military career
- Allegiance: Hojo clan
- Rank: Commander
- Conflicts: Siege of Fukazawa (1571); Siege of Odawara (1590)

Matsuda Norihide (松田 憲秀; ? – 1590) was a Japanese samurai and commander of the Sengoku period. He was one of the most important vassals of the Go-Hōjō clan and the salary he got was the highest among Go-Hōjō clan's vassals.

On the occasion of the Siege of Odawara (1590), he insisted on keeping Odawara Castle but later he secretly betrayed Go-Hōjō clan and tried to join Toyotomi Hideyoshi. After the fall of the Go-Hōjō clan, he was ordered to seppuku by Toyotomi Hideyoshi. On the other hand, his second son Matsuda Hideharu became a vassal of Maeda Toshiie.

His cousin Matsuda Yasunaga died in the siege of Yamanaka Castle in 1590.
