= Siege of Odawara (1590) =

Toyotomi victory in the Sengoku period

Coordinates: 35.2508°N 139.1536°E

Third Siege of Odawara
- Part of the Sengoku period
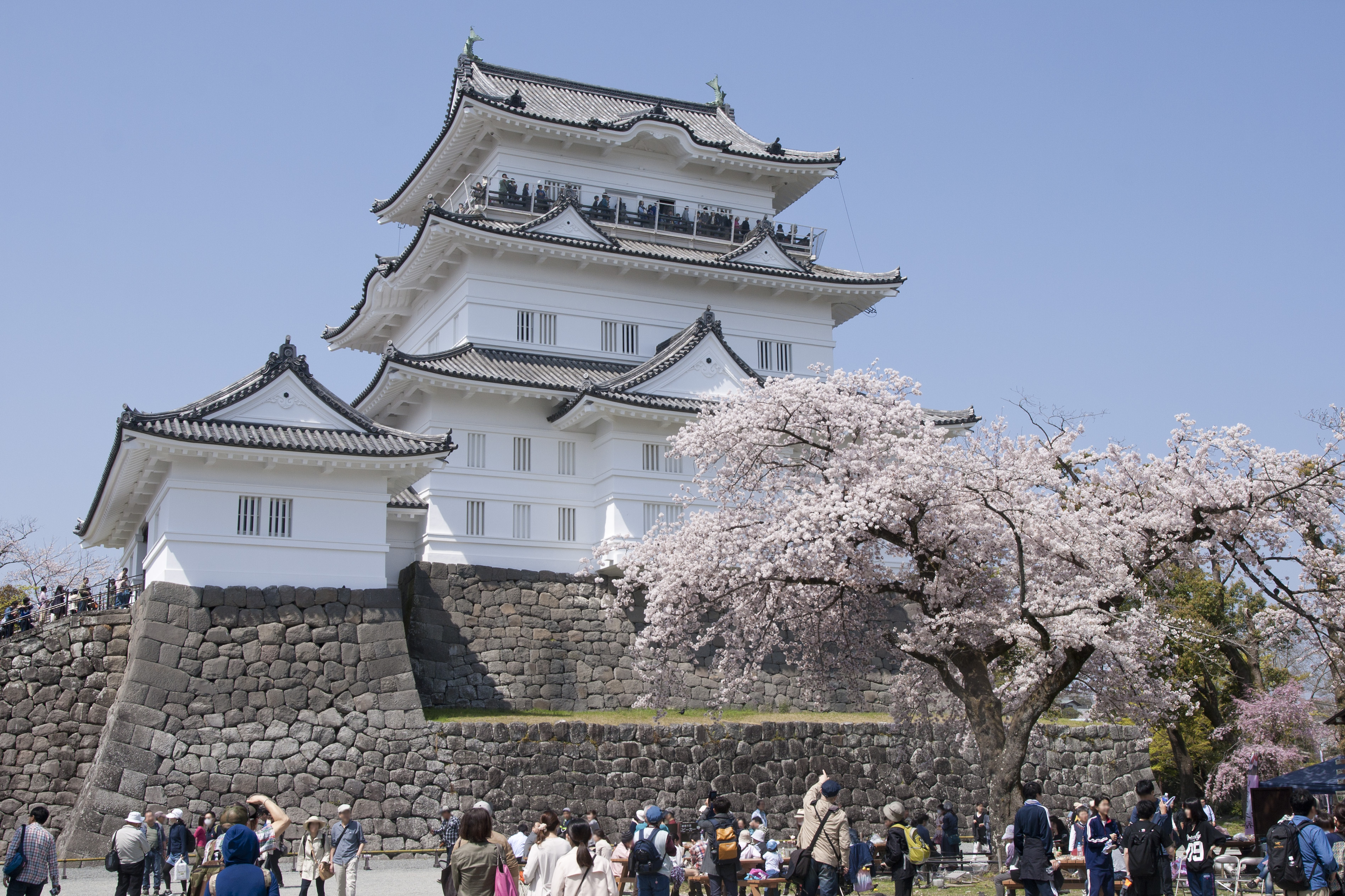
- Later Hōjō era’s Odawara Castle
Date	May – August 4, 1590
Location	Odawara Castle, Sagami Province, Japan
Result	Siege succeeds; Toyotomi victory

Belligerents
Toyotomi clan	Later Hōjō clan

Commanders and leaders
Toyotomi Hideyoshi; Tokugawa Ieyasu; Oda Nobukatsu; Maeda Toshiie; Uesugi Kagekatsu; Honda Tadakatsu; Sakai Ietsugu; Kobayakawa Takakage; Ikoma Chikamasa; Horio Yoshiharu; Gamō Ujisato; Sanada Masayuki; Sanada Yukimura; Ukita Hideie; Hosokawa Tadaoki; Kuroda Kanbei; Ii Naomasa; Hori Hidemasa; Mogami Yoshiaki; Shimazu Toyohisa; Hattori Hanzo	Hōjō Ujimasa †; Hōjō Ujiteru †; Hōjō Ujikuni; Hōjō Ujinao; Hōjō Ujitada; Hōjō Ujimitsu; Hōjō Ujitaka; Chiba Naoshige; Matsuda Norihide; Narita Ujinaga; Daidōji Masashige; Fūma Kotarō

Strength
Army of the Tōkaidō: 170,000; Army of the Tōsandō: 35,000; Navy: 10,000–20,630; 220,000 total	82,000 total
- Location within Kanagawa Prefecture Siege of Odawara (1590) (Japan)

The third Siege of Odawara (小田原征伐, Odawara seibatsu) occurred in 1590, and was the primary action in Toyotomi Hideyoshi's campaign to eliminate the Hōjō clan as a threat to his power. The months leading up to it saw hasty but major improvements in the defense of the castle, as Hideyoshi's intentions became clear. Thus, despite the overwhelming force brought to bear by Hideyoshi, the siege saw little actual fighting.

== Background ==
In 1588, Toyotomi Hideyoshi succeeded in re-unifying the nation, after several campaigns following the death of Oda Nobunaga in 1582. Hideyoshi asked Hōjō Ujimasa and Ujinao (father and son), to attend the imperial visit to Jurakudai (Hideyoshi's residence and office in Kyoto), but Ujimasa refused. However, Ujimasa proposed to reschedule the visit to spring or summer of 1590, but Hideyoshi in turn refused the proposal, which worsened their relationship. In May 1590, Hideyoshi launched the Odawara Campaign against Hōjō.

Ujimasa held a faint hope that Date Masamune would come to offer support, and if the battle reached a stalemate, Tokugawa Ieyasu would defect to his side.

== Siege ==
The massive army of Toyotomi Hideyoshi surrounded the castle in what has been called "the most unconventional siege lines in samurai history." The samurai were entertained by everything from concubines and prostitutes to musicians, acrobats, fire-eaters, and jugglers. The defenders slept on the ramparts with their arquebuses and armor; despite their smaller numbers, they discouraged Hideyoshi from attacking. So, for the most part, this siege consisted of traditional starvation tactics. Only a few small skirmishes erupted around the castle, as when a group of miners from Kai Province dug under the castle walls, allowing men under Ii Naomasa to enter. After three months, the sudden appearance of Ishigakiyama Ichiya Castle took away the Hōjō defenders' will to resist and they surrendered.

In addition to taking Odawara Castle, Hideyoshi also defeated the Hōjō at their outposts, led by Maeda Toshiie and Uesugi Kagekatsu this army captured the Hōjō strongholds one-by-one: Matsuida Castle, Minowa Castle, Maebashi Castle, Matsuyama Castle and Hachigata castle before finally arriving at Hachiōji Castle, and Shizuoka in and near the southwestern part of the Kantō region. Included Shimoda fortress at Ise Province led by Chosokabe Motochika, where Hideyoshi's naval forces defeated the Izu suigun.

The Chiba clan, allies of the Hōjō in Shimōsa, also saw Sakura Castle fall to Honda Tadakatsu and Sakai Ietsugu of the Tokugawa army during the campaign. Chiba Shigetane, daimyō of the Chiba, surrendered the castle to the besieging forces on the condition that his clan would not be abolished. While the Chiba were consequently divested of all of their holdings, many of their senior members were taken into service by Tokugawa retainer Ii Naomasa, thanks to aid he had received many years earlier from the clan during the occupation of Takeda Katsuyori's Tsutsujigasaki Castle.

However, at Siege of Oshi castle led by Ishida Mitsunari, the defenders surrendered after hearing word that their lord had been defeated at Odawara.

== Aftermath ==
Hōjō Ujimasa failed to hold Odawara against the forces of Toyotomi Hideyoshi and finally Odawara was taken. Later, Ujimasa was forced to commit suicide along with his brother Ujiteru.

Tokugawa Ieyasu, one of Hideyoshi's top generals, was given the Hōjō lands. Though Hideyoshi could not have guessed it at the time, this would turn out to be a great stepping-stone towards Tokugawa's attempts at conquest and the office of shogun.

The tea master Yamanoue Sōji was at the service of the Odawara lords. He was sentenced to death by torture.

== In popular culture ==
The siege of Odawara is the climax of Hideyoshi's story in the video game Samurai Warriors 2. Due to the sheer size of Odawara Castle in the game, it is divided into two stages, the eastern side besieged by the Tokugawa, Chōsokabe (in Xtreme Legends only), Shimazu, and Date armies, and the western side besieged by the Toyotomi main army.

In the Sengoku Basara Season 2 anime, Odawara Castle was the setting for the fight between Toyotomi Hideyoshi and Date Masamune. Hideyoshi was killed in the castle at Masamune's hands. Afterward, Ishida Mitsunari went to the castle to grieve his master's demise.
