= Hōjō Akinokami =

Hōjō Akinokami (北条 安芸守; born 1608) was a member of the Japanese clan of Hōjō during the Edo period (17th century) of Japan, and kami (a post akin to governor) of Aki province. It is thought that Akinokami and the famous Miyamoto Musashi were very close friends, or in a mutual discipleship. Throughout their many discussions together, Akinokami taught Musashi the ways of military strategy while the latter taught Akinokami of strategy reflecting individuality. However, this information is not truly well known because Akinokami would have been twenty-four years younger than Musashi, if born in the year 1608. If this discipleship was true, it is thought that Musashi looked at Akinokami as a master through the ways of politeness in view of the high position that Akinokami held. Doubts have also arisen through the fact that Musashi would have had his art of strategy complete by the age of fifty, and is therefore almost inconceivable that Akinokami could have been his teacher on the ways of strategy.
