= Hōjō Ujinao =

Japanese daimyō

- 北条 氏直
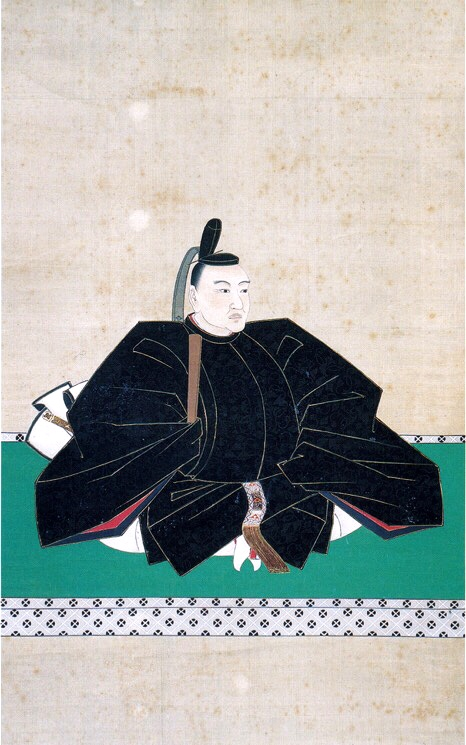

Head of Later Hōjō clan
- In office 1590–1591
- Preceded by: Hōjō Ujimasa

Personal details
- Born: Kuniōmaru; 1562 Odawara Castle
- Died: December 19, 1591 (aged 28–29) Mount Kōya
- Spouse: Tokuhime (Tokugawa)
- Relations: Tokugawa Ieyasu (father in law); Hōjō Ujimori (adopted son)
- Parents: Hōjō Ujimasa (father); Ōbai-in (mother)

Military service
- Allegiance: Later Hōjō clan Tokugawa clan Toyotomi clan
- Rank: Daimyo
- Battles/wars: Kazusa Campaign (1577): Tenshō-Jingo War (1582); Battle of Kanagawa; Battle of Wakamiko; Battle of Kurokoma; Siege of Odawara (1590)

Hōjō Ujinao (北条 氏直; 1562 – December 19, 1591) was a Japanese daimyō of the late Sengoku period, and the final head of the Later Hōjō clan. An important figure in the history of Azuchi–Momoyama politics, he lost his entire domain following the Siege of Odawara (1590). He survived the Siege and carried on as a small daimyō in the Edo period.

== Biography ==
Born in Odawara Castle in 1562, Ujinao was the grandson of Hōjō Ujiyasu and the son of Hōjō Ujimasa and was named Kuniōmaru (国王丸). His mother was the daughter of Takeda Shingen.

Coming of age in early 1577, he took the formal name Ujinao. He married Tokuhime, the second daughter of Tokugawa Ieyasu, as a condition for peace between their two clans. In maturity, Ujinao held junior 5th court rank, lower grade (ju-go-i-ge) and the title Sakyō-dayu. Later, he took part in the Ujimasa invasion at Kazusa Province. This battle marked the first battle for Ujinao.

=== Tenshō-Jingo Conflict ===
In 1582, after the death of Oda Nobunaga, Ujinao and the Hōjō family took advantage of the situation to launch an invasion of the Kai (currently Gunma Prefecture) and Shinano Provinces. However, at the same time, Tokugawa Ieyasu and the Uesugi clan also aspired to seize the vast area in Shinano Province, Kōzuke Province, and Kai Province which was ruled by the remnants of many small clans formerly serving the Takeda clan. Ieyasu invaded the Kai and Shinano provinces to establish control there with the consent of senior vassals of the Oda clan. Uesugi Kagekatsu of Uesugi clan also made his move by supporting the former Takeda clan forces under the lead of Ogasawara Dōsetsusai from Ogasawara clan and Yashiro Hidemasa at Chikuma and the Nishina clan of Azumino. They defeated and expelled Kiso Yoshimasa, who was granted the control of both Chikuma and Azumino by Oda Nobunaga. However, facing this development, another branch of Ogasawara clan (led by Ogasawara Sadayoshi and his retainers) appealed to the Tokugawa clan and offered their allegiance to Ieyasu. This caused a three-way conflict between those three factions and an event known as the Tenshō-Jingo war broke out.

By June 13, the Hōjō clan had captured Iwadono Castle in Tsuru District, and instructed Watanabe Shozaemon, a local magnate from Tsuru District, to assist them in their conquest. Subsequently, Sanada Masayuki seized Numata Castle for the Uesugi clan. On June 14 however, Kawajiri Hidetaka killed Honda Nobutoshi. Leading to an uprising from many clans in Kai province against Hidetaka on the following day, which resulted in Hidetaka being killed in June 18. On June 24, Uesugi Kagekatsu of Echigo also advanced into northern Shinano and entered Naganuma castle. Later, Ujinao attacked the location of senior retainer, Takigawa Kazumasu at the Battle of Kanagawa. On the border between the Kōzuke and Musashi provinces, Kazumasu faced off against the Hōjō forces at Kanegawa. Kazumasu had 18,000 troops, while the Hōjō wielded 55,000, Kazumasu was defeated and retreated to Nagashima. In response, on July 7, 1582, Toyotomi Hideyoshi sent a letter to Ieyasu authorizing him to dispatch troops to secure the two provinces of Kai and Shinano. (Note: Ieyasu's position and actions here are not those of an independent feudal lord, but as a feudal lord under the Oda regime, with the aim of defeating the Hojo clan)

As the main body of the Tokugawa army led by Ieyasu met with the Hōjō clan main army stationed at Wakamiko castle, a series of military engagements between them occurred, where 8,000 of Tokugawa soldiers fought against around 50,000 soldiers of Hōjō soldiers led by Hōjō Ujinao. On July 12 as the troops under Ujinao advanced across Usui Pass, Nobushige resisted them, abandoned the Komoro Castle, and retreated to a fortress which he deemed more suitable to defend against the Hōjō army. Later on July 16 of the same year, Sadayoshi launched an attack on Fukashi Castle, forcing Dōsetsusai along with Hidemasa to surrender to Sadayoshi.

In the final phase of the war, the Tokugawa forces engaged in the battle of Kurokoma against the alliance of the Hōjō and the Satomi clans, with the Hōjō clan receiving a 10,000-man reinforcement from Satomi Yoshiyori, ruler of Awa Province (Chiba). During this conflict, Sakakibara Yasumasa stormed one of the castles belonging to the Hōjō, while Matsudaira Ietada harassed the Hōjō food supplies. Later, during a standoff in Kurokoma, Tokugawa dispatched Mizuno Katsushige and Torii Mototada to lead 2,000 soldiers in a raiding operation, where they managed to repel the 10,000-man Hōjō army detachment led by Hōjō Ujinao. Hōjō Ujikatsu saw this and went to Ujitada's rescue, but was repelled.The Hōjō army ultimately failed to encircle the Tokugawa army from behind and in the end, the Tokugawa clan managed to beat the alliance of the Hōjō and Satomi clans. In the aftermath of the battle of Kurokoma, Ieyasu sent Sakai Tadatsugu in December to subdue Suwa Yoritada at Suwa in Shinano, where Tadatsugu managed to subdue Yoritada and secure his surrender to the Tokugawa clan.

As the war turned in favor of Ieyasu, and combined with the defection of Sanada Masayuki to the Tokugawa side, the Hōjō clan negotiated a truce with Ieyasu. The Hōjō clan then sent Hōjō Ujinobu as a representative, while the Tokugawa sent Ii Naomasa for the preliminary meetings. In October, representatives from the Oda clan such as Oda Nobukatsu, Oda Nobutaka, and Toyotomi mediated the negotiations until the truce officially concluded. It was recorded that the invasion of Satake Yoshishige against the territory of Hōjō also encouraged them to accept the truce with Tokugawa.

=== Fall of Go-Hōjō clan ===
In 1590, Odawara fell to a siege at the hands of Toyotomi Hideyoshi; his father and uncle were forced to commit suicide, but Ujinao was spared because he was Tokugawa Ieyasu's son-in-law. Ujinao and his wife were exiled to Mount Kōya, where he died later the following year.

His adoptive son, Hōjō Ujimori, was the first daimyo of Sayama-han (Kawachi Province).

== Family ==
- Father: Hojo Ujimasa
- Mother: Obaiin (1543–1569)
- Wife: Toku Hime
- Children:
  - Son by Tokuhime
  - Hoshuin-dono married Ikeda Toshitaka by Tokuhime
  - Manshuin-dono by Tokuhime

== Appendix ==
=== Bibliography ===
- Kazuhiro Marushima (丸島和洋) (2015). "北条・徳川間外交の意思伝達構造" [The structure of communication in diplomacy between the Hojo and Tokugawa]. 国文学研究資料館紀要. 11 (11). 国文学研究資料館. doi:10.24619/00001469. ISSN 1880-2249.
- Hirayama, Yū (2011), 武田遺領をめぐる動乱と秀吉の野望 [Takeda's Territory and Hideyoshi's Ambitions], 戎光祥出版, ISBN 978-4-86403-035-9
- Hirayama, Yū (2015). 天正壬午の乱 [Tensho-Jingo war] (増補改訂版 ed.). 戎光祥出版. ISBN 978-4-86403-170-7.
- Shinichi, Saito (2005). 戦国時代の終焉. 中公新書 1809. 中央公論新社. ISBN 4121018095.
