= Siege of Hachigata (1590) =

- Part of the Sengoku period
Date	1590
Location	Hachigata Castle, Musashi province, Japan 36.1092°N 139.196°E
Result	Toyotomi victory

Belligerents
Forces of Toyotomi Hideyoshi	Hōjō clan forces

Commanders and leaders
Maeda Toshiie; Uesugi Kagekatsu	Hōjō Ujikuni

Strength
35,000	Unknown

The 1590 siege of Hachigata was the penultimate battle of Toyotomi Hideyoshi's campaigns against the Hōjō clan, during Japan's Sengoku period. Hachigata was one of the last major fortresses of the Hōjō, whose opposition in the Kantō region Hideyoshi sought to eliminate, having already subjugated all of Western Japan.

The besieging force of 35,000 men was led by Maeda Toshiie and Uesugi Kagekatsu. The Hōjō garrison under the command of Hōjō Ujikuni held out for over a month before the castle fell.

== See also ==
- Siege of Hachigata (1568)
