= Hōjō Ujiteru =

- 北条 氏照
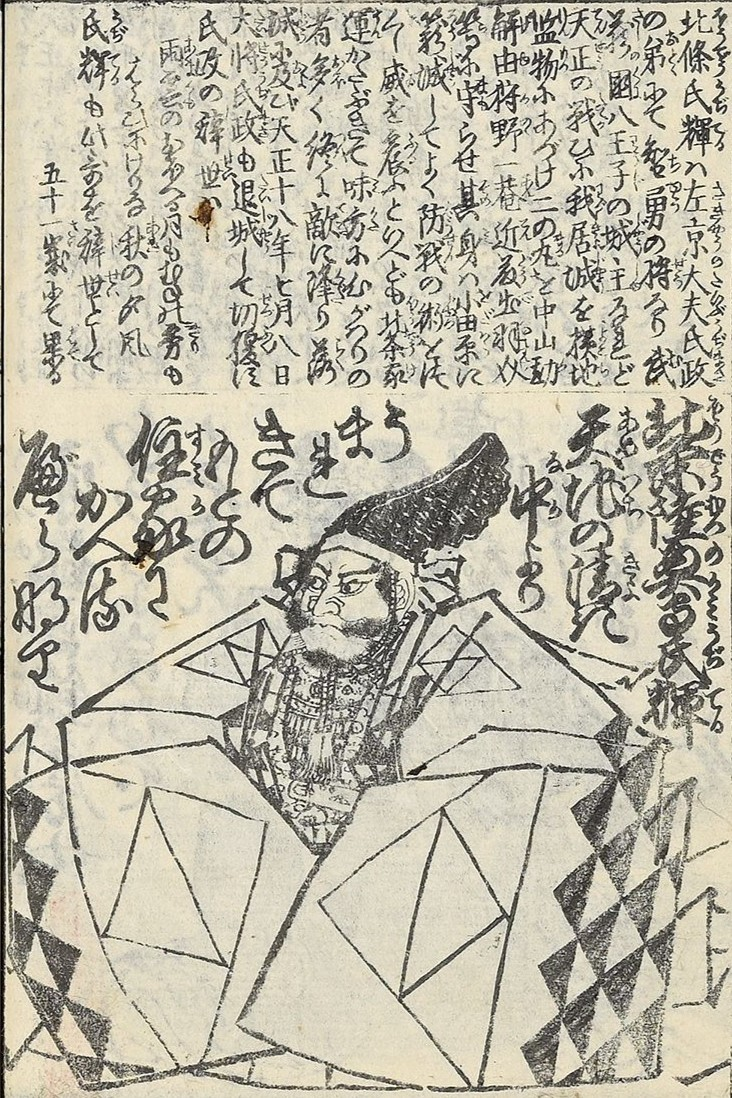
- Born: 1540; Sagami Province, Japan
- Died: August 10, 1590 (aged 49–50); Odawara Castle, Sagami Province, Japan
- Relatives: Hōjō Ujiyasu (father); Hōjō Ujimasa (brother); Hōjō Ujikuni (brother); Hōjō Ujinori (brother); Uesugi Kagetora (brother)
- Military career
- Allegiance: Later Hōjō clan
- Commands: Takiyama Castle; Hachioji Castle
- Conflicts: Siege of Odawara (1561); Battle of Konodai (1564); Siege of Takiyama (1568); Battle of Mimasetoge (1569); Siege of Hachioji (1590); Siege of Odawara (1590)

Hōjō Ujiteru (北条 氏照; 1540? – August 10, 1590) was a Japanese samurai, who was the son of Hōjō Ujiyasu and lord of Hachiōji Castle in what is now Tokyo. He fought in the Siege of Odawara (1561) and Battle of Konodai (1564).

In 1568, Ujiteru defended Takiyama Castle from Takeda Shingen. Later in 1569, Ujiteru and his brother Hojo Ujikuni commanded a major force at the Battle of Mimasetoge, where they unsuccessfully attempted to prevent Takeda Shingen from withdrawing to his home province of Kai after besieging the Hōjō's core castle at Odawara.

Later in the 1590 siege of Odawara against Hideyoshi, Ujiteru left only 1,300 men behind at Hachiōji Castle when he went to the aid of the defenders of Odawara Castle, who had been surrounded by Toyotomi Hideyoshi. Shortly thereafter, on June 23, 1590, more of Hideyoshi's forces, numbering 30,000 and led by Maeda Toshiie and Uesugi Kagekatsu, arrived to take the castle, which fell in just one day. After the Hōjō were defeated, Ujiteru was forced to commit seppuku along with his brother Ujimasa.

The grave of Hojo Ujiteru exists in two places: one in Odawara City and the other at the site of Hachioji Castle.

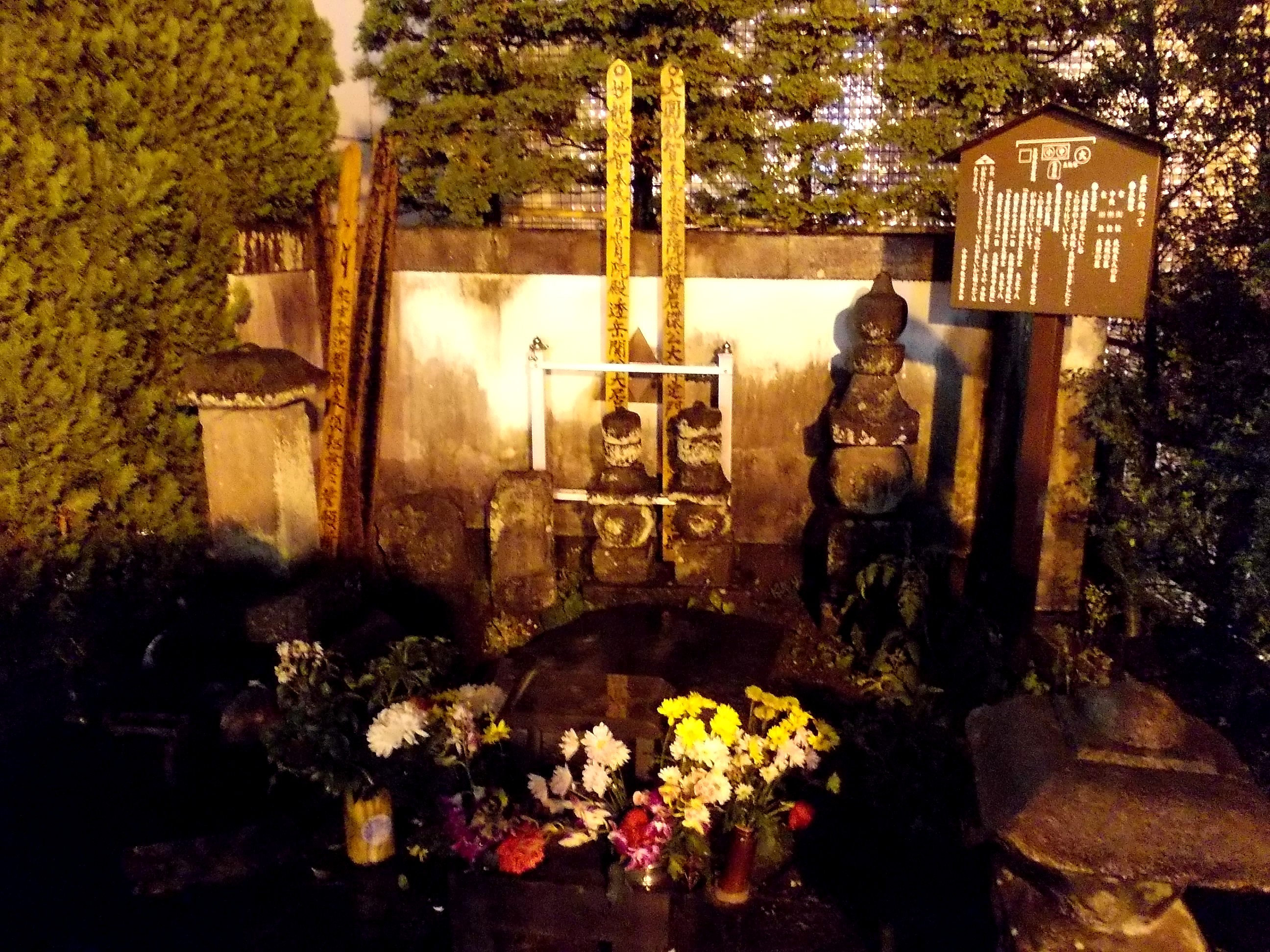
Grave of Hojo Ujimasa and Ujiteru (A) in Odawara city

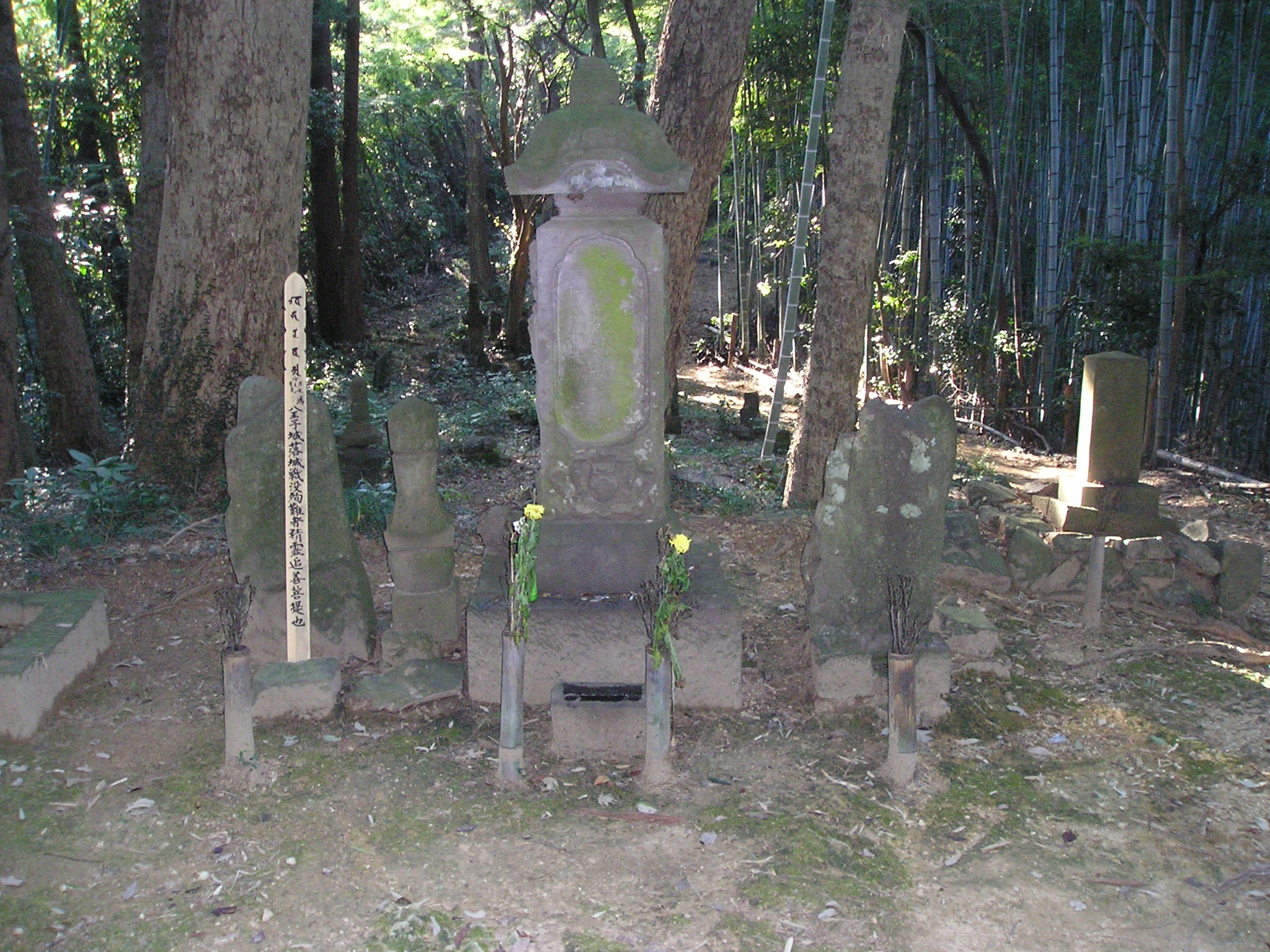
Hōjō Ujiteru's grave (B) near Hachioji Castle
