= Hōjō Ujiyasu =

Japanese daimyo of the Sengoku period

- 北条 氏康
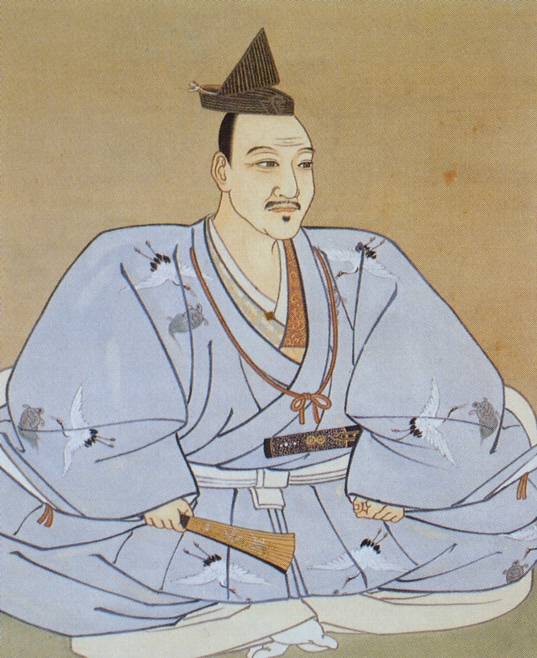

Head of Later Hōjō clan
- In office 1541–1559
- Preceded by: Hōjō Ujitsuna
- Succeeded by: Hōjō Ujimasa

Personal details
- Born: Chiyomaru; 1515 Odawara Castle, Sagami Province, Japan
- Died: October 21, 1571 (aged 55–56) Odawara Castle, Sagami Province, Japan
- Spouse: Zuikei-in
- Children: Lady Hayakawa; Hojo Masako; Hōjō Ujimasa; Hōjō Ujiteru; Hōjō Ujikuni; Hōjō Ujinori; Uesugi Kagetora
- Parents: Hōjō Ujitsuna (father); Yōjuin-dono (mother)
- Relatives: Hōjō Genan (uncle); Hōjō Tsunashige (brother in law); Imagawa Yoshimoto (brother-in-law)
- Nickname: "Lion of Sagami"

Military service
- Allegiance: Later Hōjō clan
- Rank: Daimyō (warlord)
- Unit: Later Hōjō clan
- Commands: Odawara Castle
- Battles/wars: Battle of Ozawahara (1530); Siege of Kawagoe (1545); Siege of Hirai Castle (1551); Siege of Odawara (1561); Siege of Iwatsuki (1561); Siege of Matsuyama (1563); Battle of Kōnodai (1564); Battle of Numajiri (1567); Siege of Odawara (1569)

Hōjō Ujiyasu (北条 氏康; 1515 – October 21, 1571) was a daimyō (warlord) and third head of the Odawara Hōjō clan. Known as the "Lion of Sagami", he was revered as a fearsome samurai and a cunning man. He is famous for his strategies of breaking the siege from Takeda Shingen and Uesugi Kenshin. A son of Hōjō Ujitsuna (北条 氏綱), his only known wife was Imagawa Yoshimoto's sister, Zuikei-in. Among his sons are Hōjō Ujimasa and Uesugi Kagetora.

== Early life and rise ==
Born in 1515, his childhood name was Chiyomaru (千代丸). He fought his first battle when he was fifteen years old, facing Uesugi Tomooki of the Ōgigayatsu Uesugi clan (扇谷上杉家) at the Battle of Ozawahara in 1530.

Upon his father's death in 1541, a number of the later Hōjō's enemies sought to take advantage of the opportunity to seize major Hōjō strongholds. Faced with almost endless warfare, Ujiyasu was compelled to reorganize the administration of the Hōjō lands. He had already ordered a series of aggressive cadastral surveys between 1542 and 1543, and in 1550, he overhauled the Kandaka (ja) taxation system.

Odawara, where his home castle Odawara Castle (小田原城) was located, was gradually transformed into an important trading center by modifying the region's throughways (which were hitherto designed with Kamakura as a hub) and creating an artisan's guild within the castle town. In addition, post stations and market places sprung up throughout the Hôjô's lands. Ujiyasu soon became one of the main powers in the Kantō region.

== Conflict with Uesugi ==
In 1545, Uesugi Tomosada, of the Ōgigayatsu Uesugi clan and the eldest legitimate son of Uesugi Tomooki, attempted to regain Kawagoe Castle for the Uesugi clan. Tomosada allied himself with the Koga Kubo Ashikaga Haruuji (足利 晴氏) and Uesugi Norimasa (上杉 憲政) of the Yamauchi Uesugi clan (山内上杉家) and besieged Kawagoe Castle (Siege of Kawagoe Castle). The castle garrison, led by Hōjō Tsunashige (北条 綱成), the stepson of Ujiyasu's brother Tamemasa (北条 為昌) and son-in-law of Ujitsuna, was outnumbered 3,000 to allegedly 80,000 men. Ujiyasu, leading a relief force of 8,000 soldiers, slipped some samurai past the enemy lines to inform Tsunashige of the enemy's approach, and made use of ninja to learn of the enemy's strategy and attitude. Using this intelligence, he led a night raid against the Ashikaga-Uesugi forces, which is now said to be one of the most notable examples of night fighting in samurai history. "The result was the complete defeat of the Uesugi forces and the Koga contingent. From that date the Go-Hōjō ("Later-Hōjō") as they were called, went on to further triumphs, beginning with the destruction of the Uesugi family." Despite being vastly outnumbered, the Hōjō army defeated the besiegers because, under Ujiyasu's orders, they were not bulked down by heavy armor and were not slowed by seeking to take heads.

This victory marked the decisive turning point in the struggle for the Kanto, and in the following years, proved the end of the Ōgigayatsu Uesugi line and destroyed the prestige of Uesugi Norimasa of the Yamanouchi Uesugi clan as Kantō kanrei (Governor-General of Kantō region, 関東管領). As a result, many of the Kantō warlords became vassals of the Hōjō clan.

In 1551, Ujiyasu defeated Uesugi Norimasa at Hirai Castle (平井城) and forced him to flee to Echigo, where he was taken into the protective custody of his retainer Nagao Kagetora, the later day Uesugi Kenshin and heir to Norimasa by adoption.

In 1559, Ujiyasu retired at the age of 45 and Hōjō Ujimasa inherited formal leadership of the family.

In 1561, Kenshin assumed the post of Kantō kanrei from Uesugi Norimasa and in the same year tried to conquer the region once more. Kenshin besieged Odawara Castle and burned down the town, withdrawing after two months (Siege of Odawara (1561)).

== Hojo expansion ==
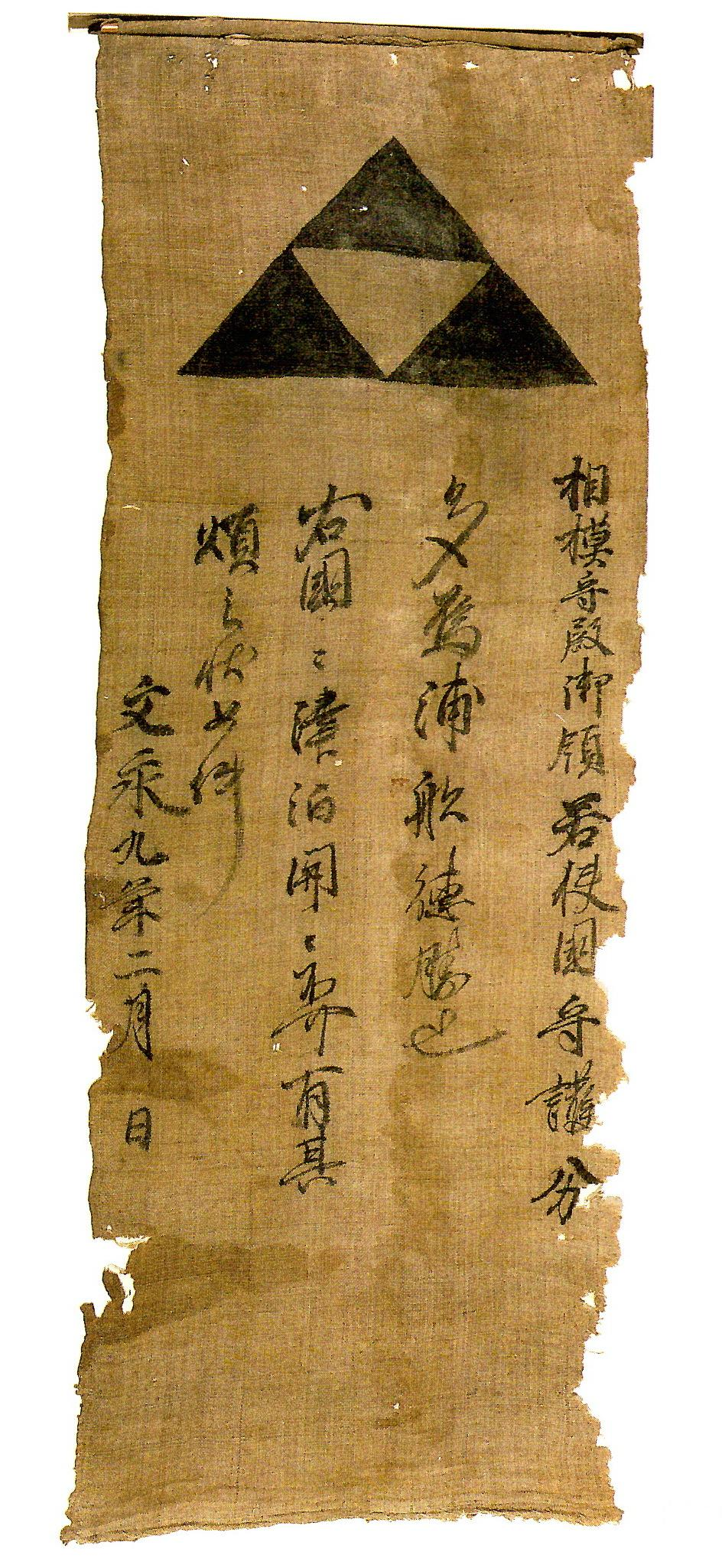
Hōjō clan's flag

In 1561, after Uesugi withdrew from Odawara, the Hojo clan seized Iwatsuki Castle against Ōta Sukemasa and almost conquered whole Musashi Province.

In 1563, Ujiyasu allied himself with Takeda Shingen and regained Matsuyama Castle (松山城) in Musashi Province against Uesugi Norikatsu (上杉憲勝) (Siege of Musashi-Matsuyama (1563)).

In 1564, he took Kōnodai in Shimōsa Province following a battle against Satomi Yoshihiro (里見 義弘) (Battle of Kōnodai (1564)). Following this victory, Ujiyasu pushed on into Shimosa Province and Kazusa Province, but was never able to destroy the Satomi clan, who remained a thorn in the Hôjô's side right up until 1590.

Ujiyasu expanded the Hōjō territory, which now covered five provinces (Sagami, Izu, Musashi, Shimosa and Kazusa), and managed and maintained what his father and grandfather had held.

After the second battle of Konodai in 1564, the Hōjō largely contented themselves with ruling the vast tracts of land earned through 60 years of war and toil.

Ujiyasu's eastern moves brought the Hōjō into conflict against the Satake clan of Hitachi Province. At the Battle of Numajiri in 1567, Satake Yoshishige defeated the Hojo forces and limited their expansion.

== Conflict with Takeda ==
Towards the end of his life Ujiyasu saw the first major conflicts between his own clan and Takeda Shingen (武田 信玄), who would become one of the greatest warlords of the period.

In 1568, in response to Hōjō's intervention into his invasion of Suruga Province, Shingen came into Musashi Province from his home province of Kai, attacking Hachigata (鉢形城) (Siege of Hachigata (1568)) and Takiyama (滝山城) Castles, where Ujiyasu's sons repulsed them.

In 1569, after failing to take the two castles, Shingen nevertheless pressed on to the Hōjō's home castle of Odawara, burning the castle town and withdrawing after three days (Siege of Odawara (1569)). As the forces of Shingen withdrew from repeated failed sieges of Odawara Castle, two of Ujiyasu's seven sons, the brothers Ujiteru and Ujikuni, attacked him in the pass of Mimase (Battle of Mimasetoge), ending the first of the Takeda campaigns against the Hōjō at Sagami province.

Later in the year, Shingen's son and future successor Takeda Katsuyori (武田 勝頼) led a successful siege against the Hojo Kanbara Castle (蒲原城) in Suruga province (Siege of Kanbara).

Takeda Shingen also laid siege to other Hōjō holdings in the surrounding provinces, including Fukazawa castle (深沢城) in Suruga province which was taken in 1571 (Siege of Fukazawa).

== Death ==
Subsequently, Ujiyasu managed to make peace with Uesugi Kenshin and Takeda Shingen, the most powerful adversaries of Hōjō Ujiyasu, letting his seventh son Hōjō Saburō be adopted by childless Kenshin and accepting the fait accompli of Shingen's reign over Suruga. To cement the ties of Takeda-Imagawa-Hojo, Ujiyasu also gave his two daughters to those two clans; Lady Hayakawa wed to Imagawa Ujizane, while Lady Hojo (Hojo Masako) wed to Takeda Katsuyori becoming his second wife. Ujiyasu died in 1571, passing on the Hōjō domains to his eldest son Ujimasa (北条 氏政) in a relatively favourable situation.

== Family ==
- Father: Hojo Ujitsuna
- Mother: Yojuin-dono
- Wife: Zuikein (d.1590)
- Adopted brother: Hōjō Tsunashige
- Concubines:
  - sister of Katsurayama Yasumitsu
  - Matsuda-dono
- Children:
  - Hojo Shinkuro (1537–1552) by Zuikein
  - Lady Hayakawa
  - Lady Hojo (1564–1582) married Takeda Katsuyori by Matsuda-dono
  - Hōjō Ujimasa by Zuikein
  - Jokoin married Ashikaga Yoshiuji and gave birth to Ashikaga Ujinohime.
  - Nanamagari-dono married Hojo Ujishige
  - Hōjō Ujiteru by Zuikein
  - Chorin’in married Ota Ujisuke
  - Hōjō Ujikuni by Zuikein
  - Ozaki-dono married Chiba Chikatane
  - Hōjō Ujinori by Zuikein
  - Tanseikuji-dono married Ogasawara Yasuhiro
  - Hōjō Ujitada (d.1593)
  - Kikuhime married Satomi Yoshiyori
  - Hōjō Ujimitsu (d.1590)
  - daughter married Chiba Toshitane
  - Uesugi Kagetora by sister of Katsurayama Yasumitsu
