= Siege of Hachigata (1568) =

1568 siege in Japan

- Part of the Sengoku period
Date	1568
Location	Hachigata Castle, Musashi province 36.1092°N 139.196°E
Result	Hōjō victory

Belligerents
forces of Hōjō Ujiyasu	forces of Takeda Shingen

Commanders and leaders
Hōjō Ujikuni	Takeda Shingen

Strength
6,800	6,000

The first siege of Hachigata castle took place in 1568; Takeda Shingen laid siege to Hachigata Castle, which was controlled by Hōjō Ujikuni, but was unable to capture it.

After failing to capture Hachigata Castle, Shingen then moved south to besiege Takiyama Castle, on his way to the Hōjō capital of Odawara.

== See also ==
- Siege of Hachigata (1590)
