= Hachigata Castle =

Building in Yorii, Saitama Prefecture, Japan

- 鉢形城
- Yorii, Saitama, Japan
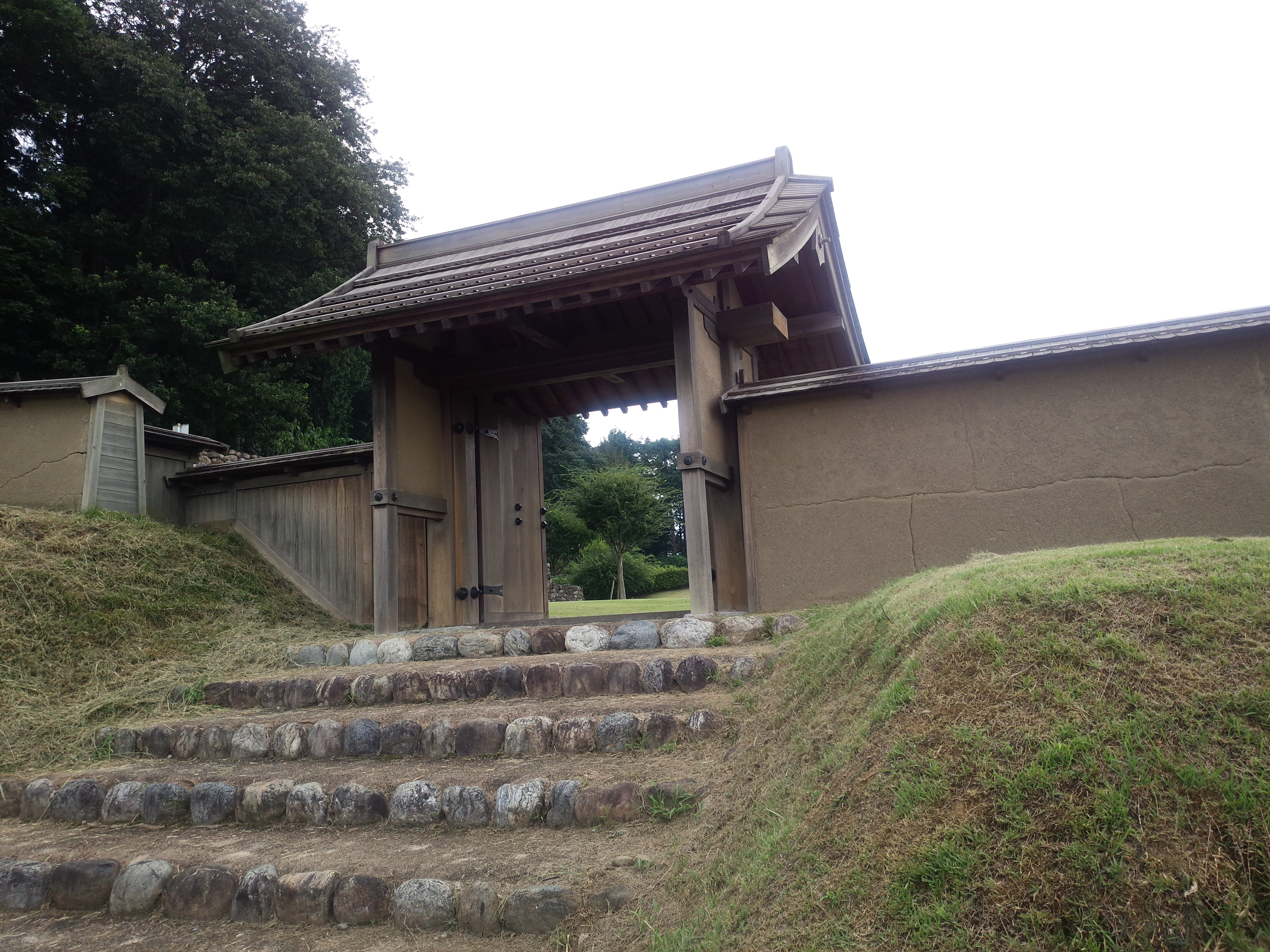
- Reconstructed gate and wall of Hachigata castle

Site information
- Type: hirayama-style Japanese castle
- Open to the public: Yes
- Condition: ruins

Location
- Hachigata Castle Hachigata Castle (Japan)
- Coordinates: 36°6′35.04″N 139°11′45.54″E

Site history
- Built: 1476
- Built by: Nagao Kageharu
- In use: Muromachi through Sengoku period
- Demolished: 1590

Hachigata Castle (鉢形城, Hachigata-jō) was a Sengoku period Japanese castle, located in the town of Yorii, Saitama Prefecture, in the Kantō region of Japan. Its ruins have been protected as a National Historic Site since 1932.

== Overview ==
Hachigata Castle was located on a peninsula surrounded by the Arakawa River and the Fukasawagawa River, which contributed to its defenses. Due to its location at western edge of then Kantō Plain, Hachigata Castle was regarded as a key to the control of Musashi Province and was a major stronghold for the Later Hōjō clan during the Sengoku Period.

== History ==
Hachigata Castle was built in approximately 1476 by Nagao Kageharu (1443-1514). The Nagao clan was a cadet house of the Yamanouchi Uesugi clan who held the hereditary title of Kantō Kanrei. However, Nagao Kageharu had a falling out with his overlord and fought against the Uesugi intermittently over a 20-year period using this castle as his stronghold. Later, the Nagao were forced from the area and the Uesugi appointed their vassals, the Fujita clan, as castellans. When the Later Hōjō clan under Hōjō Soun expanded into Musashi Province, the Fujita resisted until the defeat of the Uesugi at the Siege of Kawagoe Castle in 1546, at which time they were forced to submit.

Hōjō Ujikuni was assigned rule over the northern Hōjō holdings in 1564, and improved the defences of the castle due to its proximity to the aggressive Takeda clan to the west and the resurgent Uesugi clan to the north. He built a large barricade complex of wide dry moats and clay ramparts at the root of the hill, and extended the outer defensive line. Unlike many other castles of the Hōjō clan, he made use of stone walls in vital areas, including the main gate, which were also to emphasize his power and authority. The castle grew to stretch for nearly a kilometer east to west along the ridge, and 500 meters from north-to-south.

Takeda Shingen attempted to seize the castle in 1568 during the Siege of Hachigata, but failed due to its extensive fortifications. After the death of Takeda Shigen, Hōjō Ujikuni counterattacked and seized large portions of Kōzuke Province. This brought him into conflict with the Sanada clan and by extension, with the Toyotomi clan. When Toyotomi Hideyoshi decided to destroy the Hōjō, Ujikuni pushed for a strategy to ambush the Toyotomi armies en route; however, he was overruled by Hōjō Ujimasa, so he withdrew his armies to Hachigata. For a month in March 1590, Hachigata Castle held off the 30,000 strong forces of both Maeda Toshiie and Uesugi Kagekatsu with a mere 3,000 defenders during the Second Siege of Hachigata. Ujikuni finally surrendered the castle under the condition that the lives of his men would be spared. During the Edo period, the castle was demolished.

== Current situation ==
Along with a large amount of ruins that remain largely undisturbed by development, a small part of the castle has been reconstructed, including some walls, a gate, and a building. The site is about a 20 minute walk from the Tōbu Tōjō Line Yorii Station. A museum, the Hachigata Castle History Museum (鉢形城歴史館, Hachigatajō Rekishikan) dedicated to the castle's history has also been erected.

The castle was listed as one of Japan's Top 100 Castles by the Japan Castle Foundation in 2006.

== Gallery ==
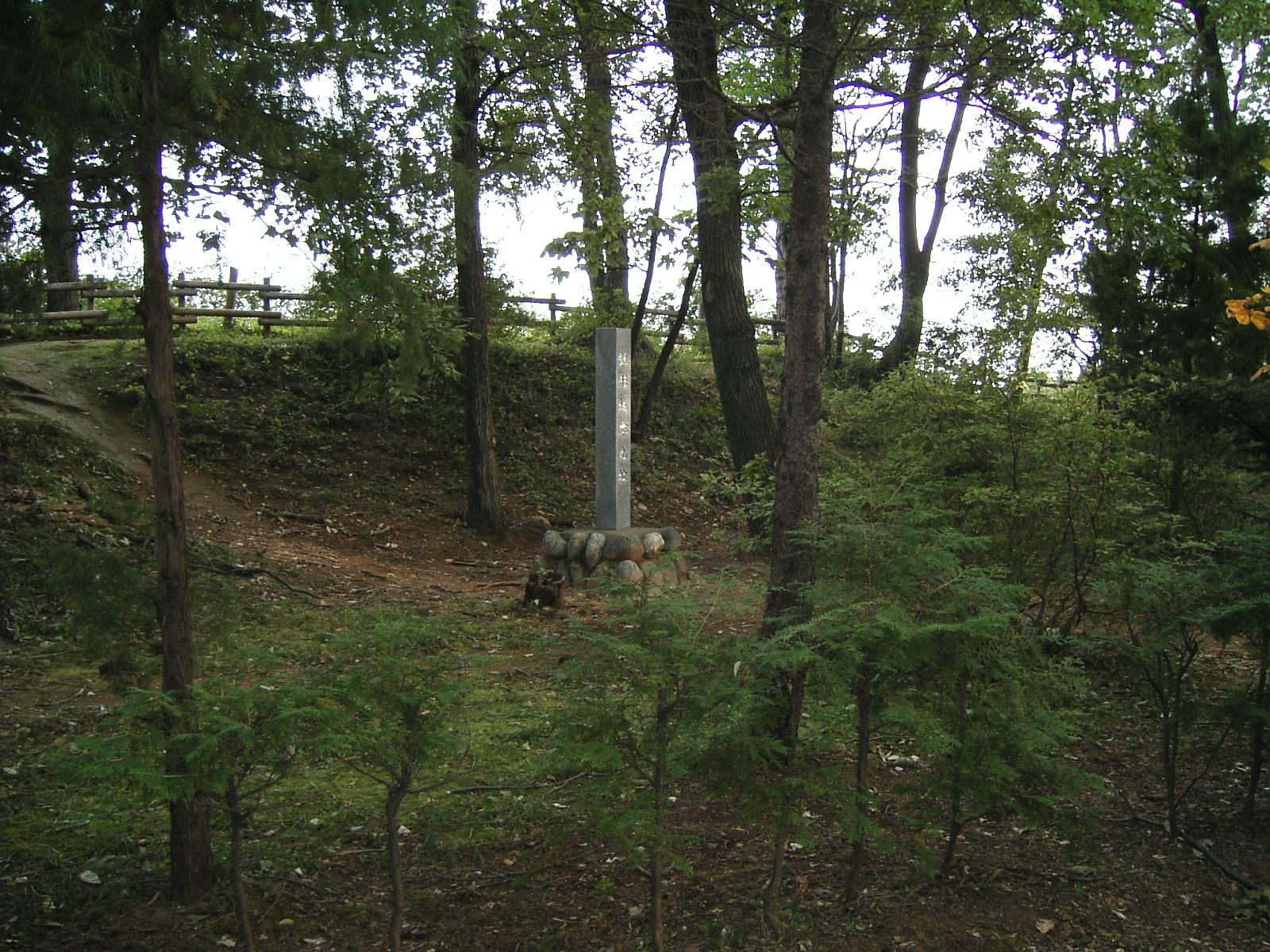
Honmaru compound of Hachigata castle

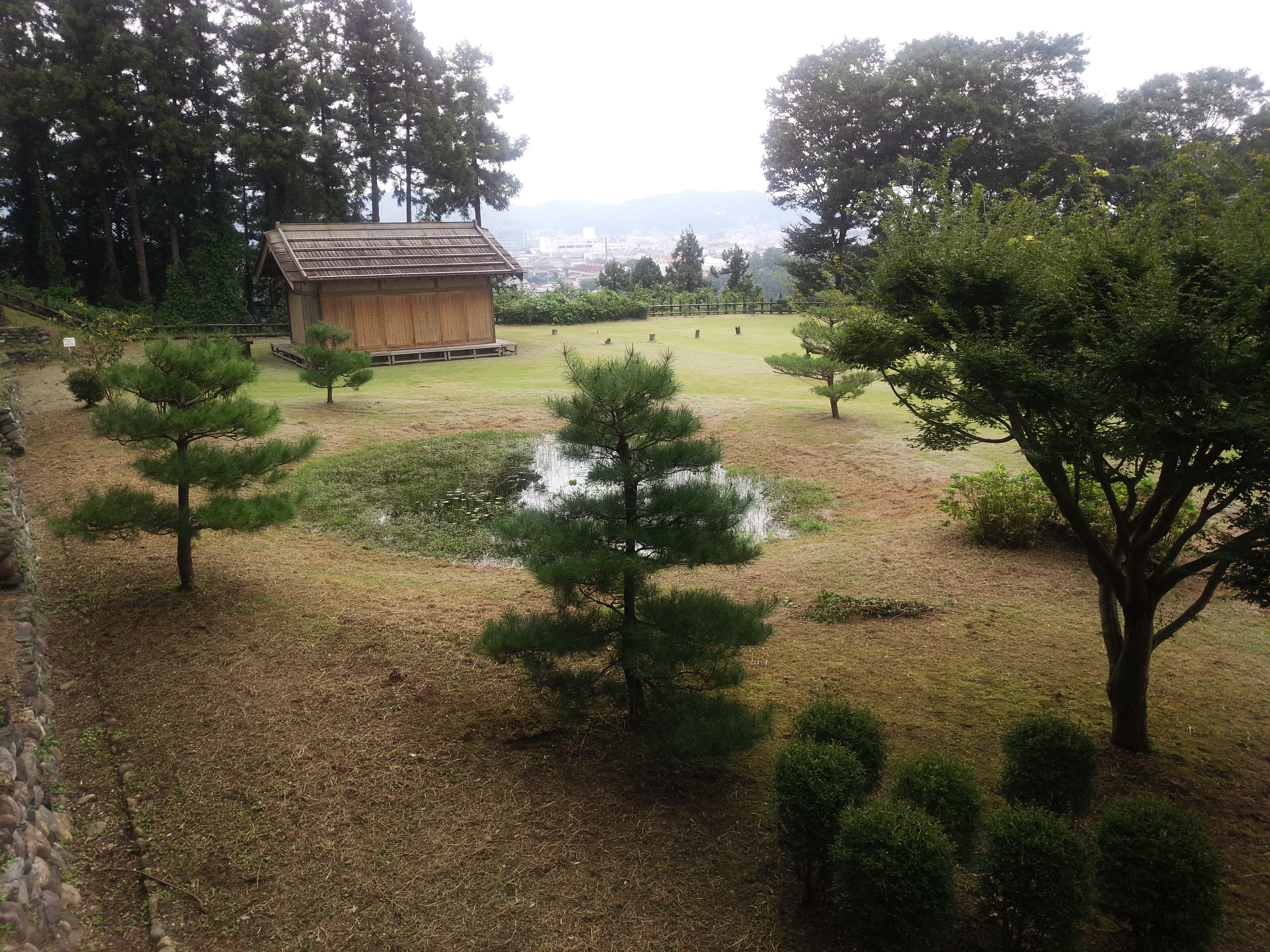
Reconstructed pond and small building of Hachigata castle

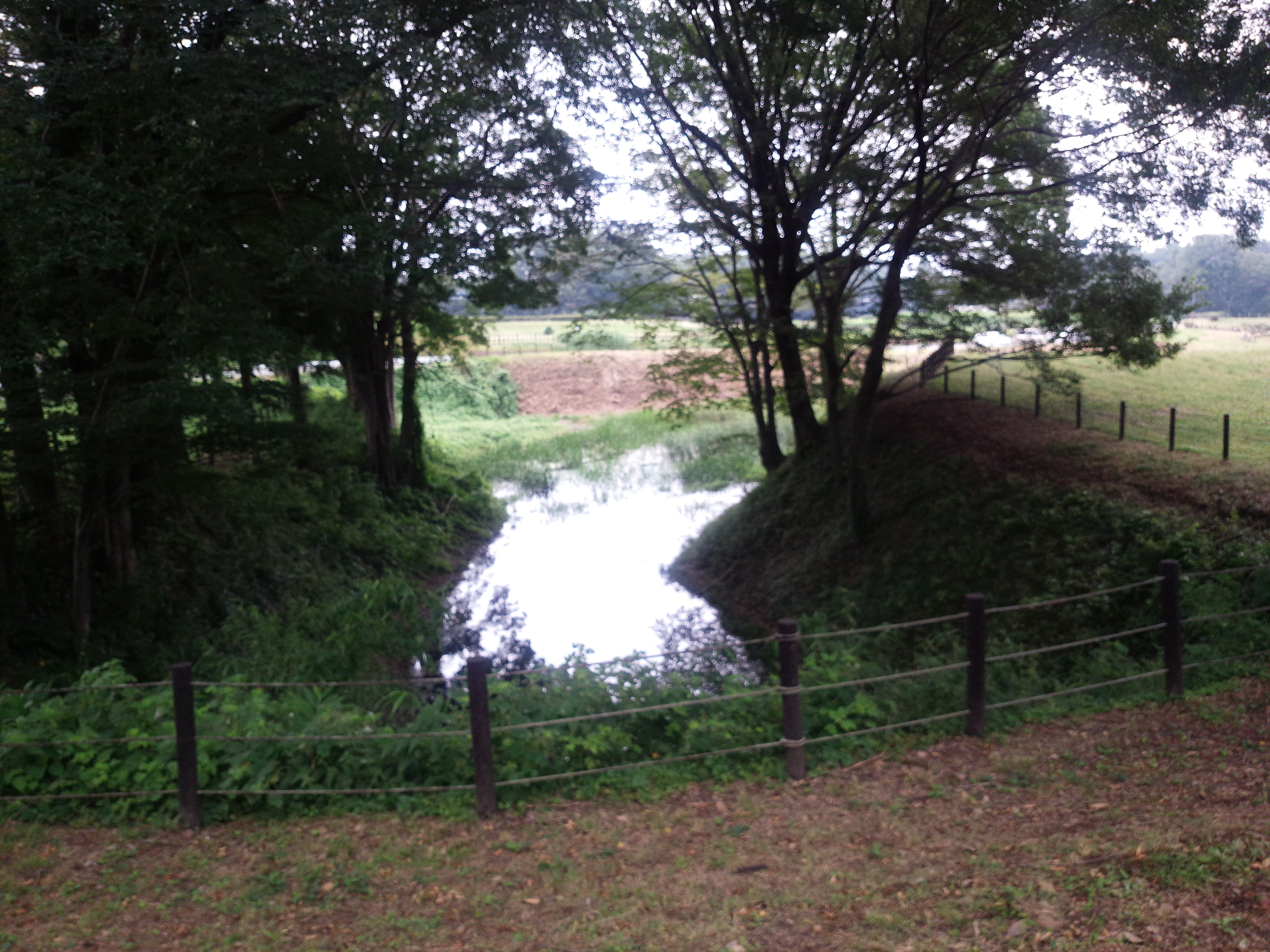
Water moat of Hachigata castle

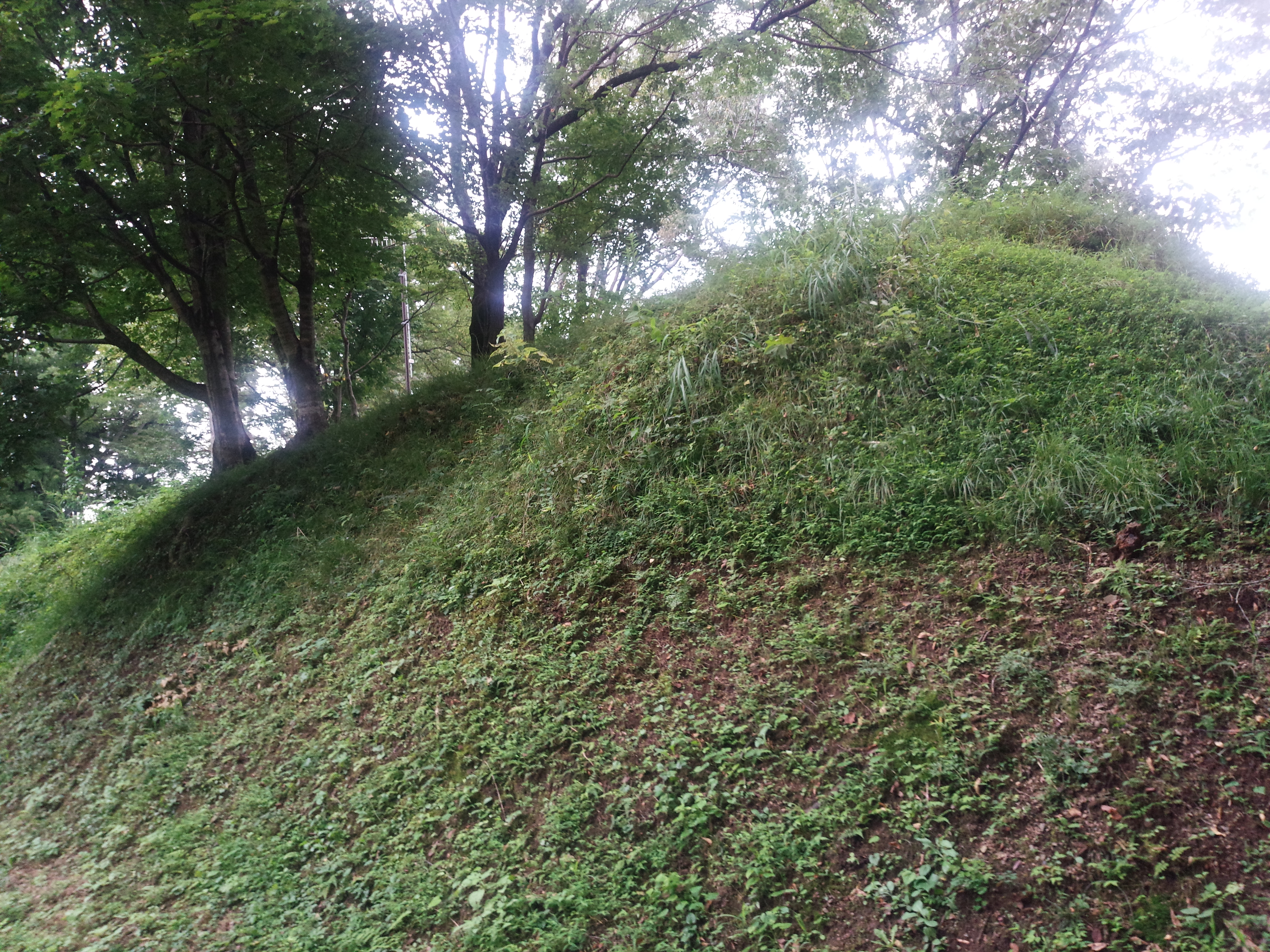
Eathen wall of Hachigata castle

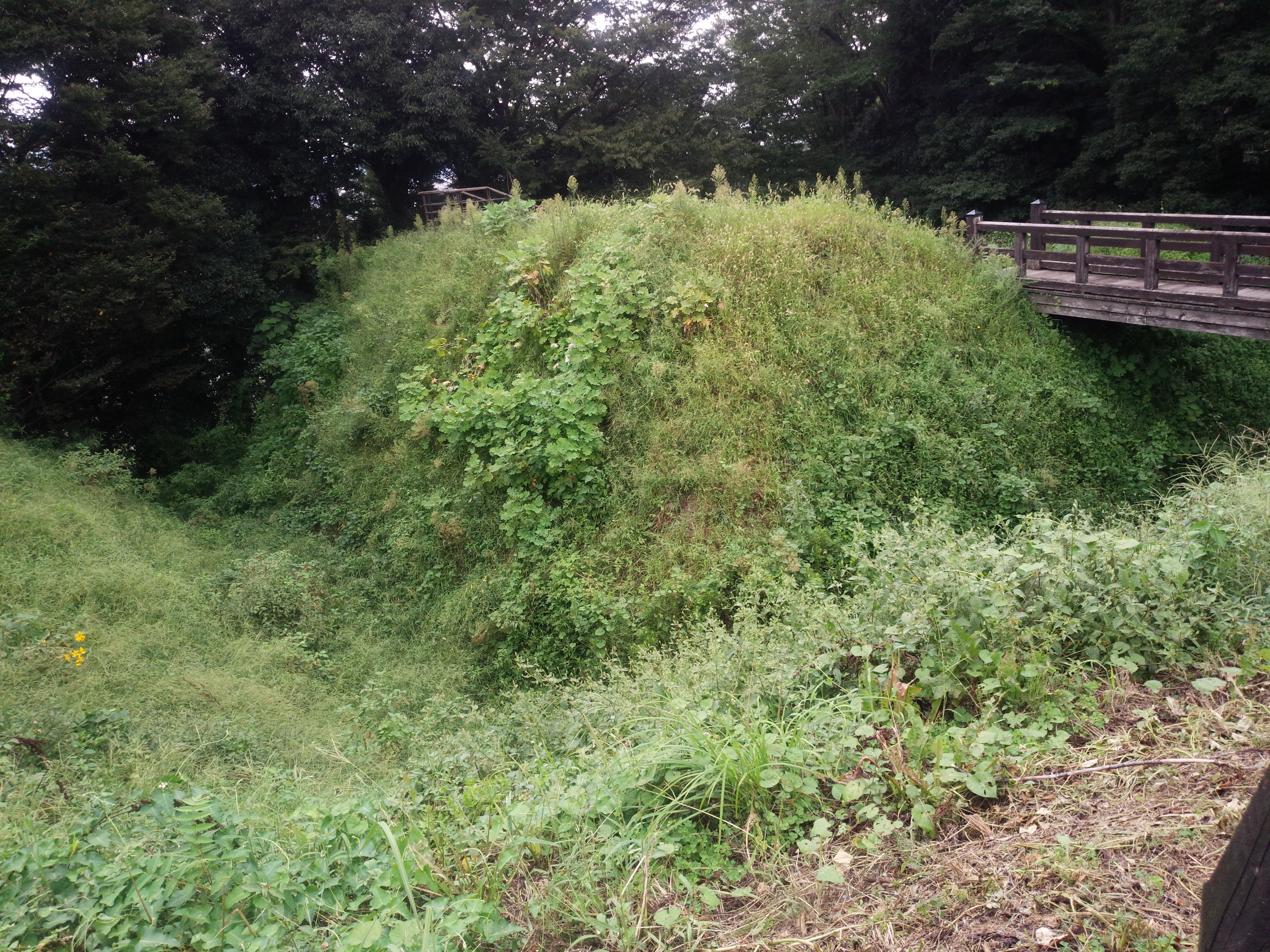
Moat and Umadashi compound of Hachigata castle

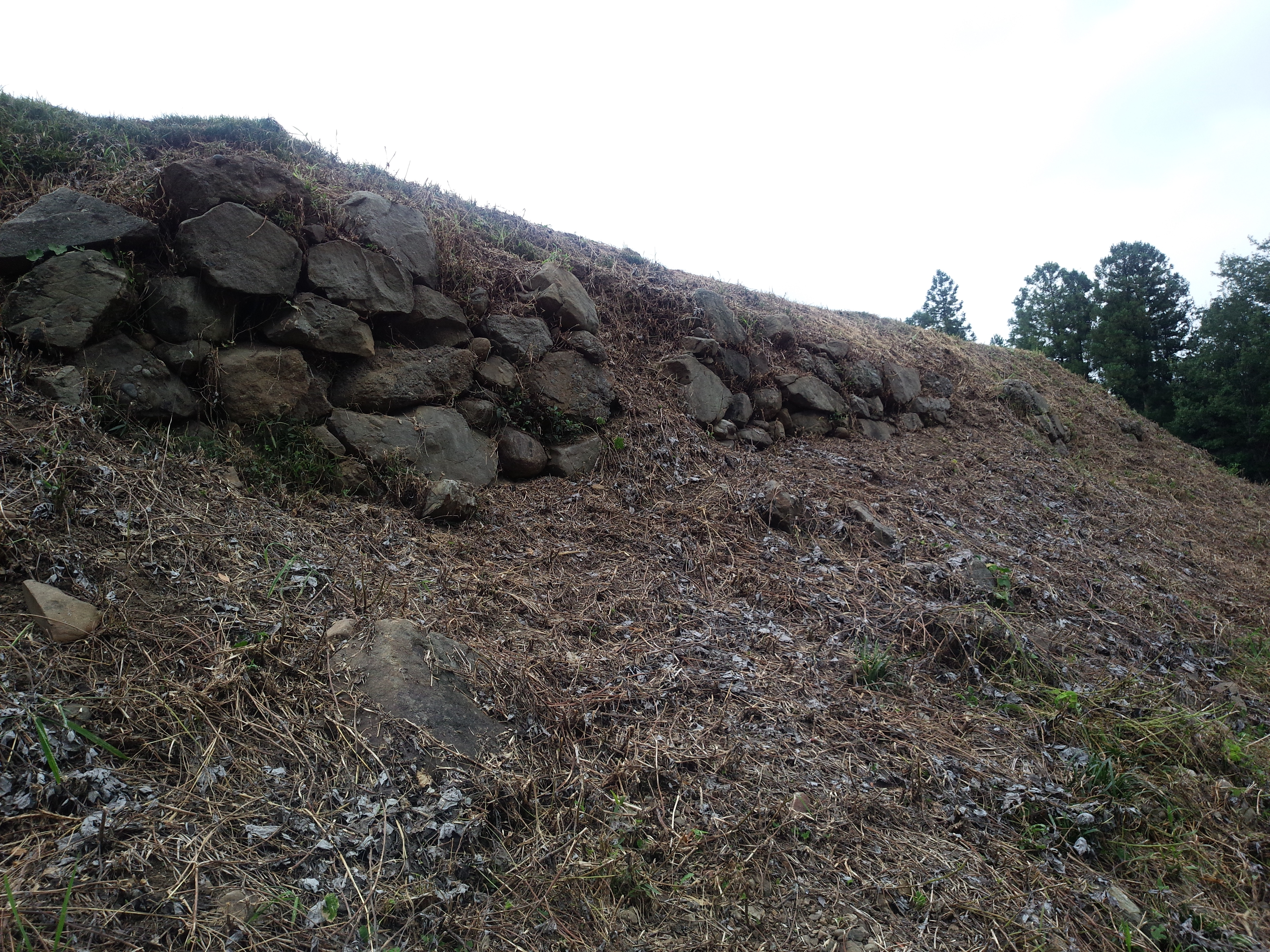
Stone wal of Hachigata castle

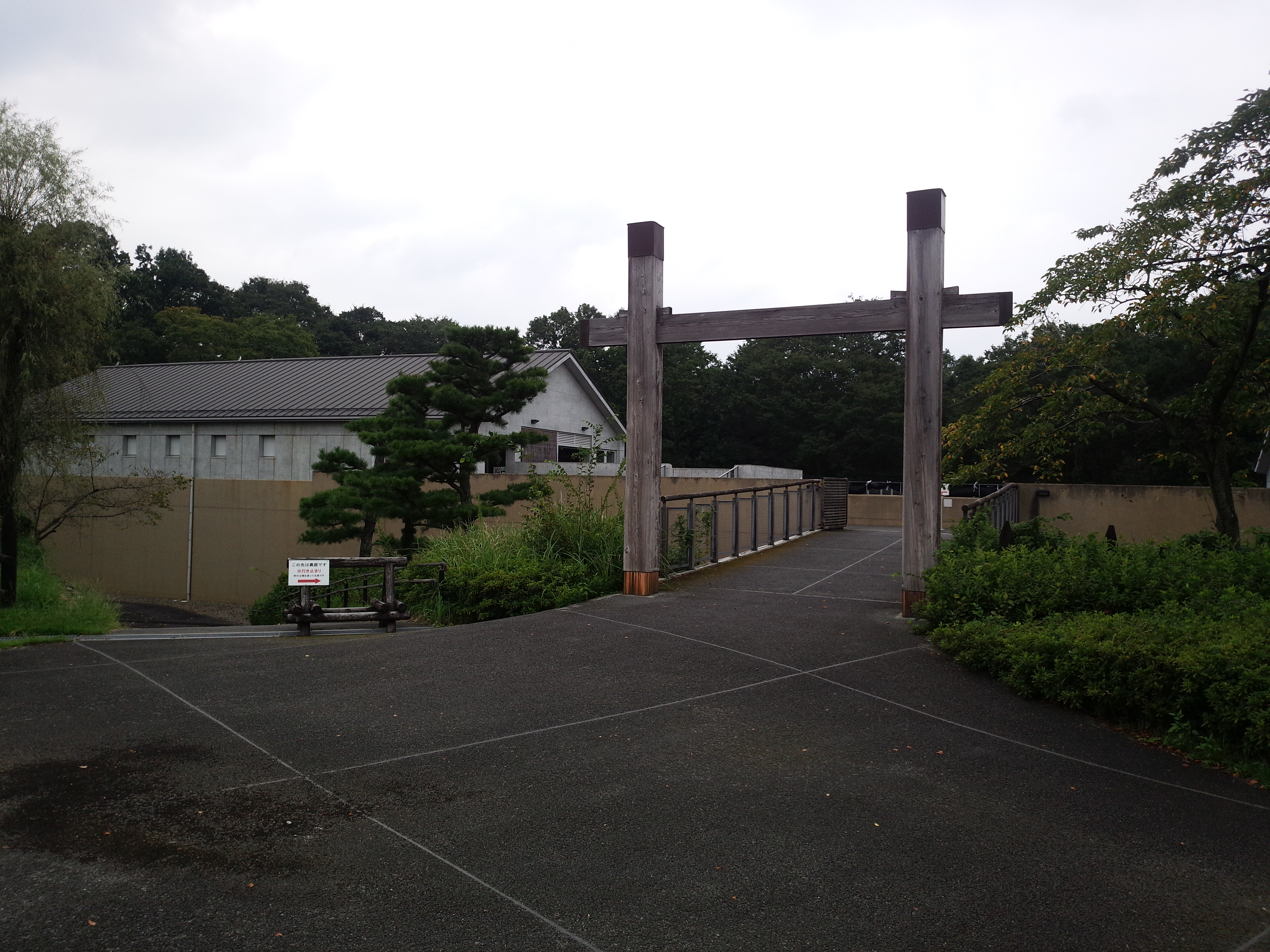
Hachigata castle historical Museum

== See also ==
- List of Historic Sites of Japan (Saitama)

== Literature ==
- De Lange, William (2021). An Encyclopedia of Japanese Castles. Groningen: Toyo Press. p. 600. ISBN 978-9492722300.
