= Hōjō Ujimasa =

Head of the Japanese Hōjō clan and daimyō of Odawara (1538–1590)

- 北条 氏政
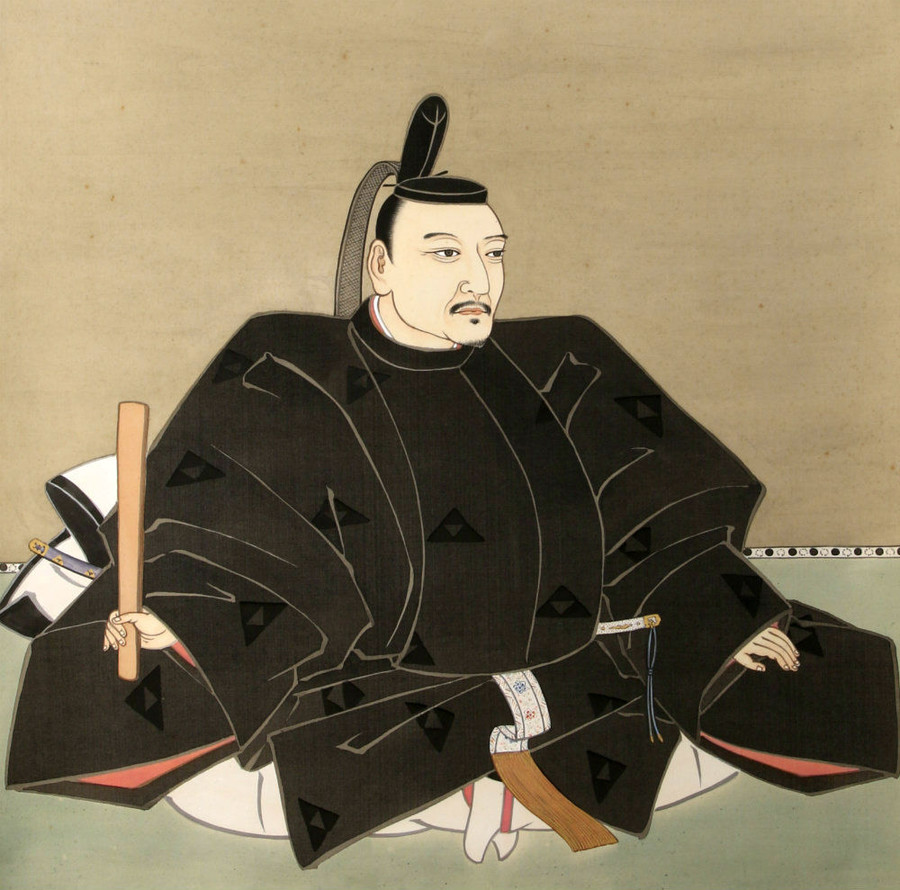

Head of Later Hōjō clan
- In office 1559–1590
- Preceded by: Hōjō Ujiyasu
- Succeeded by: Hōjō Ujinao

Personal details
- Born: 1538 Sagami Province, Japan
- Died: August 10, 1590 (aged 51–52) Odawara Castle, Sagami Province, Japan
- Spouse(s): Ōbai-in; Hōshō-in
- Children: 12, including Hōjō Ujinao
- Parents: Hōjō Ujiyasu (father); Zuikei-in (mother)
- Relatives: Lady Hayakawa (sister); Hōjō Ujiteru (brother); Hōjō Ujikuni (brother); Hōjō Ujinori (brother); Uesugi Kagetora (brother); Imagawa Yoshimoto (maternal uncle); Imagawa Ujizane (cousin and brother-in-law); Takeda Shingen (father-in-law); Takeda Katsuyori (brother-in-law)

Military service
- Allegiance: Later Hōjō clan
- Rank: Daimyo
- Commands: Odawara Castle
- Battles/wars: Siege of Odawara (1561); Battle of Konodai (1564); Siege of Odawara (1569); Siege of Sekiyado (1574); Siege of Gion castle (1575); Kazusa Campaign (1577); Battle of Omosu (1580); Battle of Tenmokuzan (1582); Siege of Odawara (1590)

Hōjō Ujimasa (北条 氏政; 1538 – August 10, 1590) was the fourth head of the later Hōjō clan, and daimyō of Odawara. Ujimasa succeeded the territory expansion policy from his father, Hōjō Ujiyasu, and achieved the biggest territory in the clan's history.

== Early life and rise ==
In 1538, Ujimasa was born as the second son of Hōjō Ujiyasu. His childhood name was Matsuchiyo-maru (松千代丸). As Ujiyasu's first son, Shinkuro, died young, Ujimasa became the apparent heir of Ujiyasu.

In 1554, when Ujiyasu make an alliance with Takeda Shingen and Imagawa Yoshimoto, Ujimasa took a daughter of Shingen, Obai-in, for his lawful wife.

Upon Ujiyasu's retirement, Ujimasa inherited formal leadership of the family around 1559.

== Hōjō Campaign ==
In 1560, Hojo clan seized Iwatsuki Castle and almost conquered whole Musashi Province. Ujimasa commanded in many battles, he took part in the Battle of Konodai (1564), including the Siege of Odawara (1569).

In 1574, Ujimasa forced Sekiyado Castle of Shimosa Province under Yanada Harusuke to surrender and also forces Yuki Harutomi a vassal of Uesugi clan swore allegiance to Ujimasa.

In 1575, he forced Gion Castle of Shimotsuke Province under Oyama Hidetsuna to surrender.

In 1577, Ujimasa invaded Kazusa Province and realized the reconciliation with his old enemy, Satomi Yoshihiro. This battle marked the first battle for his heir, Hojo Ujinao.

In 1580, after Takeda Katsuyori joined the force to support Uesugi Kagekatsu and Uesugi Kagetora killed himself, Ujimasa built a new alliance with Oda Nobunaga and Tokugawa Ieyasu. He invaded the territory of the Takeda clan in Suruga from both sides attacked Katsuyori, which triggered the Battle of Omosu and later join attack on Conquest of Koshu, from the east of Kai province at Battle of Tenmokuzan in 1582.

In 1582, following the sudden death of Oda Nobunaga, Ujimasa took advantage of the situation and launched an attack on Oda clan territory at Battle of Kanagawa, who had received territories after the defeat of Takeda Katsuyori. Later, Hojo and Tokugawa clans settled a territorial dispute by giving the Tokugawa clan Kai and Shinano Provinces and the Hojo clan Kozuke Province.

== Conflict with Hideyoshi ==
In 1588, Toyotomi Hideyoshi succeeded the unifying nation from Oda Nobunaga. Hideyoshi asked Ujimasa and Ujinao, the father and son, to attend the imperial visit to Jurakudai (Hideyoshi's residence and office in Kyoto), but Ujimasa refused it. However, Ujimasa proposed to reschedule the visit to spring or summer of 1590, but Hideyoshi refused the proposal, which worsened their relationship.

== Death ==
In 1590, after Ujimasa consolidated his clan's position and retired. His son Hōjō Ujinao became head of the clan and lord of Odawara. Later that year, Hideyoshi launch the Odawara Campaign against Hōjō clan.

=== 3rd Siege of Odawara ===
In 1590, Odawara Castle was the biggest castle in Japan at that moment. However, Hideyoshi surrounded the castle with the biggest army in all of Japan. Hojo's plan was to use all of his castles in Kantō against Hideyoshi via guerrilla warfare. However, Hideyoshi defeated all these castles one by one with his samurai and vassals. Ujimasa failed to hold Odawara against the forces of Toyotomi Hideyoshi; finally, Odawara fell. Later, Ujimasa was forced to commit suicide along with his brother Ujiteru.

Like many samurai who committed seppuku in the face of shameful defeat, Ujimasa composed death poems:

Autumn wind of eve
Blow away the clouds that mass
O'er the moon's pure light.
And the mists that cloud our mind
Do thou sweep away as well.

(雨雲の おほへる月も 胸の霧も はらひにけりな 秋の夕風)

Now I'm about to disappear,
Wondering how I should feel it.
From the emptiness I came,
Hence I shall return there.

(我が身今 消ゆとやいかに 思ふべき 空より来たり 空へ帰れば)

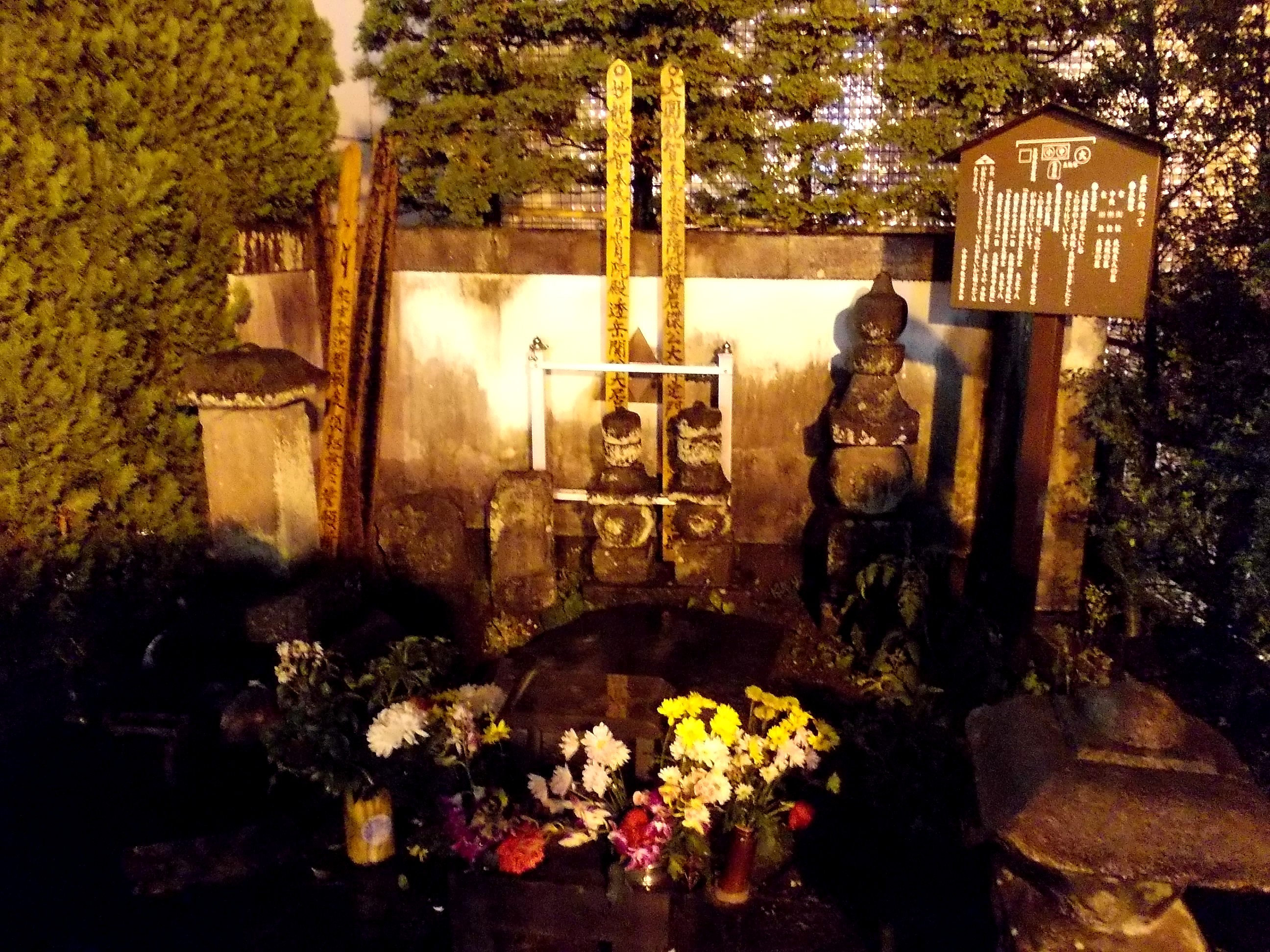
Grave of Hōjō Ujimasa and Ujiteru

== Family ==
- Father: Hōjō Ujiyasu
- Mother: Zuikei-in (died 1590), daughter of Imagawa Ujichika
- Wives:
  - Ōbai-in (1543–1569), daughter of Takeda Shingen
  - Hōshō-in (died 1590)
- Children:
  - Hōjō Shinkurō (1555 – c. 1557) by Ōbai-in
  - Hōjō Ujinao by Ōbai-in
  - Ōta Gengorō (1563–1582) by Ōbai-in, son-in-law of Ōta Ujisuke
  - Ōta Ujifusa (1565–1592) by Ōbai-in, son-in-law of Ōta Ujisuke
  - Chiba Naoshige (died 1627) by Ōbai-in, son-in-law of Chiba Kunitane
  - Hōjō Naosada by Ōbai-in
  - Hōjō Genzō
  - Hōjō Katsuchiyo (born 1590) by Hōshō-in
  - daughter married Suzuki Shigeuji
  - daughter married Niwata Shigesada
  - daughter married Satomi Yoshiyori
  - daughter married Chiba Kunitane

=== Relatives ===
- Sisters
  - Lady Hayakawa (Zōshun-in) married Imagawa Ujizane
  - Jōkō-in
- Brothers
  - Hōjō Ujiteru, committed seppuku with Ujimasa
  - Hōjō Ujikuni
  - Hōjō Ujinori
  - Hōjō Saburō or Uesugi Kagetora, son-in-law of Uesugi Kenshin
  - Hōjō Ujitada
- Niece
  - Ashikaga Ujinohime

== In popular culture ==
Hōjō Ujimasa appears in Koei's video games Kessen, Samurai Warriors 2, Samurai Warriors 3 and Warriors Orochi. He is also in Capcom's Sengoku Basara 1 and 2 (including Heroes) as an old man who is armed with a spear and has both his ancestral spirits and ice attacks and assisted by Fūma Kotarō. He also appears in The Creative Assembly's Shogun: Total War and Total War: Shogun 2. Professional wrestler Akito wrestled as Ujimasa for the Dramatic Dream Team promotion on February 10, 2013.

== See also ==
- Battle of Omosu
