= Later Hōjō clan =

Japanese clan of the Sengoku period

Hōjō 北条
- "The Three Dragonscales" – the emblem (mon) of the Hōjō clan
- Home province: Sagami; Izu
- Parent house: Taira clan, Ise clan
- Titles: Daimyō
- Founder: Hōjō Sōun (posthumous)
- Final ruler: Hōjō Ujinao
- Founding year: 1493
- Dissolution: extant
- Ruled until: abolition of the Han system

The Later Hōjō clan (Japanese: 後北条氏, Hepburn: Go-Hōjō-shi) was one of the most powerful samurai families in Japan in the Sengoku period and held domains primarily in the Kantō region. Their last name was simply Hōjō (北条), but were called "Later Hōjō" to differentiate between the earlier powerful Hōjō clan who had the same name and mon, even though the later Hōjō are not mainline direct descendants who only adopted the name for prestige.

== History ==
The history of the family is written in the Hōjō Godaiki.

The clan is traditionally reckoned to be started by Ise Shinkurō, who came from a branch of the prestigious Ise clan, descendants of Taira no Toshitsugu, a family in the direct service of the Ashikaga shoguns, as close advisors and Shugo (Governor) of Yamashiro Province (Ise Sadamichi since 1493).

During the Imagawa clan succession crisis in 1476, Shinkurō whose sister was married to Imagawa Yoshitada, Shugo (Governor) of Suruga Province, became associated with the Imagawa clan. At the death of Yoshitada in battle, Shinkurō went down to Suruga Province to support his nephew Imagawa Ujichika. Through this relationship Shinkurō quickly established a base of power in Kantō.

His son wanted his lineage to have a more illustrious name, and chose Hōjō, after the line of hereditary regents of the Kamakura shogunate, to which his wife also belonged. So he became Hōjō Ujitsuna, and his father, Ise Shinkurō, was posthumously renamed Hōjō Sōun.

The Later Hōjō, sometimes known as the Odawara Hōjō after their home castle of Odawara in Sagami Province, were not related to the earlier Hōjō clan. Their power rivaled that of the Tokugawa clan, but eventually Toyotomi Hideyoshi eradicated the power of the Hōjō clan in the siege of Odawara (1590), banishing Hōjō Ujinao and his wife Toku Hime (a daughter of Tokugawa Ieyasu) to Mount Kōya, where Ujinao died in 1591.

The tea master Yamanoue Sōji, a disciple of Sen no Rikyū, was under the patronage of the Odawara lords. Following their fall, he was brutally executed on orders by Toyotomi Hideyoshi.

The clan ruled Sayama Domain in Kawachi Province through the Edo period.

== Heads ==
The heads of the Later Hōjō clan were as follows:

- Hōjō Sōun (1432–1519)
- Hōjō Ujitsuna (1487–1541), son of Sōun
- Hōjō Ujiyasu (1515–1571), son of Ujitsuna
- Hōjō Ujimasa (1538–1590), son of Ujiyasu
- Hōjō Ujinao (1562–1591), son of Ujimasa

== Prominent vassals ==
- Hōjō Genan
- Hōjō Ujikuni
- Hōjō Ujinori
- Hōjō Ujiteru
- Hōjō Ujitada
- Hōjō Tsunataka
- Hōjō Tsunashige
- Hōjō Ujishige
- Tame Mototada
- Matsuda Norihide
- Daidōji Morimasa
- Daidōji Masashige
- Tōyama Kagetsuna
- Shimizu Yasuhide
- Tominaga Naokatsu
- Fūma Kotarō
- Naitō Tsunahide
- Ōta Ujisuke
- Narita Nagayasu
- Tōyama Tsunakage
- Chiba Naotane
- Chiba Tanetomi

== Later Hōjō clan's prominent castles ==
Castles and retainers

=== Sagami Province ===
- Odawara Castle : Home castle of Later Hōjō clan, Hōjō Ujiyasu
- Tamanawa Castle : Hōjō Ujitoki, Hōjō Tsunashige
- Misaki Castle : Hōjō Ujinori
- Ashigara Castle : Hōjō Ujimitsu
- Tsukui Castle : Naito clan
- Kawamura Castle

=== Izu Province ===
- Nirayama Castle : Hōjō Sōun
- Yamanaka Castle : Matsuda clan
- Nagahama Castle : (Hōjō navy's castle)
- Shimoda Castle : (Hōjō navy's castle) Kasahara Yasukatsu, Shimizu Yasuhide
- Kōkokuji Castle
- Fukasawa Castle
- Maruyama Castle

=== Musashi Province ===
- Edo Castle : Tominaga Naokatsu, Hōjō Tsunataka
- Setagaya Castle
- Kozukue Castle : Kasahara clan
- Takiyama Castle : Hojo Ujiteru
- Hachigata Castle : Hōjō Ujikuni
- Hachiōji Castle : Hōjō Ujiteru
- Kurihashi Castle : Hōjō Ujiteru
- Iwatsuki Castle
- Taki-no Castle
- Aoki Castle : Tame Mototada
- Oshi Castle : Narita clan
- Kasai Castle : Tōyama Kagetsuna
- Kawagoe Castle : Hōjō Tsunashige
- Matsuyama Castle

=== Other Province ===
- Matsuida Castle : Daidōji Masashige
- Moto Sakura Castle : Chiba clan
- Karasawa Castle : Sano clan
- Maebashi Castle : Kitajō Takahiro
- Numata castle
- Hirai Castle : Tame Mototada
- Usui Castle
- Oyama Castle
- Sekiyado Castle
- Koga Castle

== In popular culture ==
Hyouge Mono (へうげもの Hepburn: Hyōge Mono, lit. "Jocular Fellow") is a Japanese manga written and illustrated by Yoshihiro Yamada. It was adapted into an anime series in 2011, and includes a fictional depiction of the Hōjō.

The Hōjō are a playable faction in the video game Total War: Shogun 2.

The later Hōjō clan of the Sengoku jidai from the manga and anime of Inuyasha, and the second movie Inuyasha the Movie: The Castle Beyond the Looking Glass.

The Hojo/Houjou clan is a house/clan in AliceSoft's 7th game in the Rance series, Sengoku Rance.

The Hojo clan's mon was the inspiration for the Legend of Zelda series' Triforce logo.

== See also ==
- Hōjō Akinokami
- Lady Hayakawa
- Ashikaga Ujinohime
