= Tenchijin =

2009 taiga drama about samurai Naoe Kanetsugu

- Written by: Eriko Komatsu; Kazue Matsushita
- Directed by: Kataoka Keiji; Yōichirō Takahashi; Yūsuke Noda; Masae Ichiki
- Starring: Satoshi Tsumabuki; Kazuki Kitamura; Takako Tokiwa; Misako Tanaka; Masanobu Takashima; Shun Oguri; Tetsuji Tamayama; Masami Nagasawa; Manami Higa; Saki Aibu; Yusuke Kamiji; Yu Shirota; Mikihisa Azuma; Seishiro Kato; Kotaro Koizumi; Yoshizumi Ishihara; Yoshino Kimura; Kei Yamamoto; Akira Nakao; Kyoko Fukada; Shigeru Kōyama; Takeshi Katō; Ryuhei Matsuda; Takashi Sasano; Kōji Kikkawa; Reiko Takashima; Ken Utsui; Sumiko Fuji; Hiroshi Abe; Hiroki Matsukata
- Narrated by: Nobuko Miyamoto
- Theme music composer: Kazuhiro Koizumi
- Opening theme: "Tenchijn ～ Opening Theme" (「天地人～オープニングテーマ」) by the NHK Symphony Orchestra
- Composer: Michiru Ōshima
- Country of origin: Japan
- Original language: Japanese
- No. of episodes: 47

Production
- Executive producer: Shinsuke Naito
- Running time: 45 x 45 minutes 2 x 75 minutes

Original release
- Network: NHK
- Release: January 4 – November 22, 2009

Tenchijin (天地人) is a 2009 Japanese super historical drama television series, and the 48th taiga drama of NHK. It aired every Sunday from January 4 to November 22, 2009, spanning 47 episodes. (Note: It is an unusual Taiga Drama as the final episode will be broadcast as early as November, due to the first phase of Saka no Ue no Kumo, a series of NHK Special Drama, being broadcast from November 29 to December 27.) The drama centers on the life of 16th century samurai Naoe Kanetsugu, played by Satoshi Tsumabuki.

Production began on April 27, 2007. The drama is based on the novel of the same name by Masashi Hisaka and was adapted by Eriko Komatsu, with Michiru Ōshima as series composer. The fourth episode of the series, “An Older Woman” (「年上の女（ひと）」), is the highest-rated episode of any Japanese drama in 2009.

== Plot ==
The protagonist of the drama, Naoe Kanetsugu, was taught by Uesugi Kenshin in his youth that to conquer the world is a trifling matter, but what matters is to live one's life with righteousness. After Uesugi's death, Naoe supports Uesugi Kagekatsu, who holds the destiny of Echigo province.

== Production ==
Production Credits

- Script – Eriko Komatsu, Kazue Matsushita
- Based on the novel by – Masashi Hisaka
- Narrator – Nobuko Miyamoto
- Music – Michiru Ōshima
- Historical research – Tetsuo Owada
- Action director – Kunishirō Hayashi
- Architectural research – Sei Hirai
- Clothing research – Kiyoko Koizumi
- Titling – Sōun Takeda
- Production coordinator – Shinsuke Naitō
- Casting – Yōichirō Takahashi

Production for Tenchijin began on April 27, 2007. The usual taiga drama production had one-third of the expected number of scripts finished before shooting begun. Afterwards, audience reception was taken into account as the rest of the series was written.

== Cast ==
=== Starring role ===
- Satoshi Tsumabuki as Naoe Kanetsugu - born as Yoroku, then renamed as Higuchi Kanetsugu
  - Seishiro Kato as Higuchi Yoroku (childhood Kanetsugu)

=== Naoe house ===
- Takako Tokiwa as Osen
- Michiko Kichise as Oyū - Osen's elder sister
- Joe Shishido as Naoe Kagetsuna
- Shinji Yamashita as Naoe Nobutsuna - Osen's first husband
- Hisako Manda as Oman - Osen's mother
- Taiga as Naoe Kageaki - Kanetsugu's son
  - Seishiro Kato (Note: double role) as Takematsu (childhood Kageaki)

=== Higuchi house ===
- Masanobu Takashima as Higuchi Sōemon - Kanetsugu's father
- Misako Tanaka as Ofuji - Kanetsugu's mother.
- Kotaro Koizumi as Ōkuni Saneyori - Kanetsugu's younger brother
  - Homare Mabuchi as Higuchi Yoshichi (childhood Saneyori)
- Miro Ebato as Kita - Kanetsugu's sister

=== Uesugi clan ===
- Kazuki Kitamura as Uesugi Kagekatsu
- Tetsuji Tamayama as Uesugi Kagetora
- Hiroshi Abe as Uesugi Kenshin - foster father of Kagekatsu and Kagetora
- Saki Aibu as Hanahime
- Manami Higa as Kikuhime
- Reiko Takashima as Sentōin
- Jin Maki as Usami Sadamitsu

=== Uesugi retainers and their family members ===
- Mikihisa Azuma as Izumisawa Hisahide
  - Takuya Kusakawa as Mikihisa Azuma's second son, Matajiro
- Sei Hiraizumi as Kuribayashi Masayori
- Masayuki Suzuki as Fukazawa Toshishige
- Shingo Katsurayama as Abe Masayoshi
- Papaya Suzuki as Noborisaka Tōemon
- Satoru Matsuo as Sakurai Haruyoshi
- Minoru Matsumoto as Fukazawa Yashichirō
- Yasuhiro Arai as Kitajō Takahiro
- Kunishirō Hayashi as Kamiizumi Hidetsuna
- Kei Yamamoto as Yoshie Munenobu
- Nobuaki Kakuda as Kakizaki Haruie
- Takejō Aki as Kayo
- Shunsuke Sugiyama as Nishiyama Kanzaemon
- Takeshi Katō as Hokkō Zenshuku, a Zen priest, master of young Yoroku (Kanetsugu) and Kiheiji (Kagekatsu)

=== Oda clan ===
- Kōji Kikkawa as Oda Nobunaga
- Shingo Tsurumi as Akechi Mitsuhide
- Shun Sugata as Shibata Katsuie

=== Toyotomi clan ===
- Takashi Sasano as Toyotomi Hideyoshi
- Sumiko Fuji as Nene
- Shun Oguri as Ishida Mitsunari
- Kyōko Fukada as Yodo
- Hidekazu Mashima as Toyotomi Hidetsugu
- Go Wakabayashi as Shima Sakon
- Yoshizumi Ishihara as Fukushima Masanori
- Takamasa Suga as Ukita Hideie
- Hisayuki Nakajima as Asano Nagamasa
- Tsutomu Takahashi as Katō Kiyomasa
- Ryuhei Numata as Mashita Nagamori
- Tatsuhiro Yanase as Maeda Gen'i
- Tomoya Nakamura as Toyotomi Hideyori
- Umika Kawashima as Senhime (Ep. 46)
  - Momoko Tanabe as young senhime (Ep. 45)
- Masayuki Kikuchi as Natsuka Masaie
- Kanji Tsuda as Ōtani Yoshitsugu
- Hiroshi Yamada as Konishi Yukinaga

=== Tokugawa clan ===
- Hiroki Matsukata as Tokugawa Ieyasu
- Akinori Nakagawa as Tokugawa Hidetada
- Seiji Matsuyama as Honda Masanobu
- Taro Kawano as Sakakibara Yasumasa
- Masato Nagamori as Ii Naomasa
- Daisuke Iijima as Sakai Tadatsugu
- Ippei Kanie as Honda Masazumi
- Masaya Kikawada as Honda Masashige
- Yukijiro Hotaru as Tōyama Yasumitsu
- Atsuko Hirata as Asahi no kata

=== Mōri clan ===
- Akira Nakao as Mōri Terumoto
- Takahiro Mizuma as Mōri Hidemoto
- Tadashi Yokouchi as Kobayakawa Takakage
- Yūsuke Kamiji as Kobayakawa Hideaki

=== Maeda clan ===
- Ken Utsui as Maeda Toshiie
- Onoe Matsuya II as Maeda Toshinaga

=== Takeda clan ===
- Ichikawa Emiya II as Takeda Katsuyori
- Shun Ōide as Kōsaka Masanobu

=== Later Hōjō clan ===
- Goro Ibuki as Hōjō Ujimasa
- Yu Kamiki as Hōjō Ujinao
- Isao Sasaki as Daidōji Masashige

=== Date clan ===
- Ryuhei Matsuda as Date Masamune
- Anne Watanabe as Princess Mego - Date Masamune's wife
- Yuta Sone as Katakura Kagetsuna

=== Sanada clan ===
- Yū Shirota as Sanada Yukimura
- Ryo Iwamatsu as Sanada Masayuki
- Masami Nagasawa as Hatsune - Sanada Yukimura's older sister.
- Yuji Shirakura as Sarutobi Sasuke - a fictional ninja.

=== Chōsokabe clan ===
- Seiichi Kawano as Chōsokabe Morichika

=== Other ===
- Shigeru Kōyama as Sen no Rikyū
- Yoshino Kimura as Oryō, Rikyū's daughter

== TV schedule ==
Episode	Original airdate	Title	Directed by	Rating
1	January 4, 2009	"Gosai no Kashin" (五歳の家臣)	Hiroshi Kataoka	24.7%
2	January 11, 2009	"Nakimushi, Yoroku" (泣き虫、与六)	Hiroshi Kataoka	23.5%
3	January 18, 2009	"Tono no Hatsukoi" (殿の初恋)	Hiroshi Kataoka	24.7%
4	January 25, 2009	"Toshiue no Hito" (年上の女（ひと）)	Hiroshi Kataoka	26.0%
5	February 1, 2009	"Nobunaga wa Oni ka" (信長は鬼か)	Hiroshi Kataoka	24.2%
6	February 8, 2009	"Iza, Uijin" (いざ、初陣)	Yōichirō Takahashi	24.4%
7	February 15, 2009	"Haha no Negai" (母の願い)	Yōichirō Takahashi	23.2%
8	February 22, 2009	"Kenshin no Yuigon" (謙信の遺言)	Yōichirō Takahashi	23.1%
9	March 1, 2009	"Kenshin Shisu" (謙信死す)	Hiroshi Kataoka	20.3%
10	March 8, 2009	"Futari no Yōshi" (二人の養子)	Yōichirō Takahashi	22.2%
11	March 15, 2009	"Otate no Ran" (御館の乱)	Masae Ichiki	22.8%
12	March 22, 2009	"Inochigake no Shisha" (命がけの使者)	Masae Ichiki	21.7%
13	March 29, 2009	"Sennyū! Takeda no Jin" (潜入！武田の陣)	Hiroshi Kataoka	17.8%
14	April 5, 2009	"Ōgon no Meiyaku" (黄金の盟約)	Yōichirō Takahashi	19.8%
15	April 12, 2009	"Otate Rakujō" (御館落城)	Yōichirō Takahashi	19.6%
16	April 19, 2009	"Shingen no Musume" (信玄の娘)	Masae Ichiki	21.1%
17	April 26, 2009	"Naoe Kanetsugu Tanjō" (直江兼続誕生)	Masae Ichiki	20.1%
18	May 3, 2009	"Gi no Senshi-tachi" (義の戦士たち)	Hiroshi Kataoka	16.7%
19	May 10, 2009	"Honnō-ji no Hen" (本能寺の変)	Hiroshi Kataoka	20.2%
20	May 17, 2009	"Hideyoshi no Wana" (秀吉の罠)	Yūsuke Noda	21.6%
21	May 24, 2009	"Mitsunari no Namida" (三成の涙)	Yūsuke Noda	21.0%
22	May 31, 2009	"Sanada Yukimura Sanjō" (真田幸村参上)	Yūsuke Noda	20.7%
23	June 7, 2009	"Ai no Kabuto" (愛の兜)	Hiroshi Kataoka	22.0%
24	June 14, 2009	"Tomadoi no Jōraku" (戸惑いの上洛)	Hiroshi Kataoka	22.0%
25	June 21, 2009	"Tenkabito no Yūwaku" (天下人の誘惑)	Masae Ichiki	20.7%
26	June 28, 2009	"Kanpaku wo Shikaru" (関白を叱る)	Masae Ichiki	20.3%
27	July 5, 2009	"Yoroku to Yoshichi" (与六と与七)	Yūsuke Noda	20.1%
28	July 12, 2009	"Kita no Dokuganryū" (北の独眼竜)	Yūsuke Noda	21.8%
29	July 19, 2009	"Tenka Tōitsu" (天下統一)	Masae Ichiki	21.9%
30	July 26, 2009	"Onna-tachi no Jōraku" (女たちの上洛)	Hiroshi Kataoka	21.0%
31	August 2, 2009	"Ai no Hanaikusa" (愛の花戦)	Hiroshi Kataoka	19.6%
32	August 9, 2009	"Yotsugi no Sadame" (世継ぎの運命（さだめ）)	Yūsuke Noda	24.8%
33	August 16, 2009	"Gonin no Kanetsugu" (五人の兼続)	Yūsuke Noda	20.3%
34	August 23, 2009	"Saraba, Echigo" (さらば、越後)	Hiroshi Kataoka	14.9%
35	August 30, 2009	"Ieyasu no Inbō" (家康の陰謀)	Masae Ichiki	19.9%
36	September 6, 2009	"Shijō-saidai no Mitsuyaku" (史上最大の密約)	Masae Ichiki	20.4%
37	September 13, 2009	"Ieyasu eno Chōsenjō" (家康への挑戦状)	Hiroshi Kataoka	21.6%
38	September 20, 2009	"Futatsu no Sekigahara" (ふたつの関ヶ原)	Hiroshi Kataoka	20.0%
39	September 27, 2009	"Mitsunari no Yuigon" (三成の遺言)	Hiroshi Kataoka	19.5%
40	October 4, 2009	"Uesugi Tenraku" (上杉転落)	Yūsuke Noda	18.8%
41	October 11, 2009	"Uesugi no Ikiru Michi" (上杉の生きる道)	Yūsuke Noda	17.7%
42	October 18, 2009	"Shōgun Tanjō" (将軍誕生)	Masae Ichiki	18.2%
43	October 25, 2009	"Saneyori Tsuihō" (実頼追放)	Hirokazu Ozaki	20.9%
44	November 1, 2009	"Kanashimi no Hanayome" (哀しみの花嫁)	Masae Ichiki	19.5%
45	November 8, 2009	"Osaka no Jin e" (大坂の陣へ)	Yūsuke Noda	22.2%
46	November 15, 2009	"Osaka-jō Enjō" (大坂城炎上)	Hiroshi Kataoka	21.7%
47	November 22, 2009	"Aai wo Kakageyo" (愛を掲げよ)	Hiroshi Kataoka	22.7%
Average rating 21.2% - Rating is based on Japanese Video Research (Kantō region).

== Soundtrack and books ==
=== Soundtrack ===
- NHK Taiga Drama Tenchijin Original Soundtrack Vol.1 (February 18, 2009)
- NHK Taiga Drama Tenchijin Original Soundtrack Vol.2 (August 26, 2009)
- NHK Taiga Drama Tenchijin Original Soundtrack Vol.3 (October 21, 2009)

=== Books ===
Official guide

- NHK Taiga Drama Story Tenchijin First Part ISBN 978-4-14-923350-5 (December 20, 2008)
- NHK Taiga Drama Story Tenchijin Latter Part ISBN 978-4-14-923351-2 (July 10, 2009)
- NHK Taiga Drama Story Tenchijin Last Part ISBN 978-4-14-923352-9 (October 24, 2009)
- NHK Taiga Drama, Historical Handbook, Tenchijin ISBN 978-4-14-910693-9 (December 20, 2008)
- Sōun Takeda - Writing about Samurai ISBN 978-4-8356-1743-5 (September 30, 2009)

Novel

- Tenchijin First Volume ISBN 978-4-14-005503-8 (September 26, 2009)
- Tenchijin Last Volume ISBN 978-4-14-005504-5 (September 26, 2009)
- Tenchijin, New Edition, First Volume ISBN 978-4-14-005553-3 (November 14, 2008)
- Tenchijin, New Edition, Latter Volume ISBN 978-4-14-005554-0 (November 14, 2008)
- Tenchijin, New Edition, Last Volume ISBN 978-4-14-005555-7 (November 14, 2008)
