= Sakado Castle =

Sengoku period yamajiro-style Japanese castle

- 坂戸城
- Minamiuonuma, Niigata Prefecture, Japan
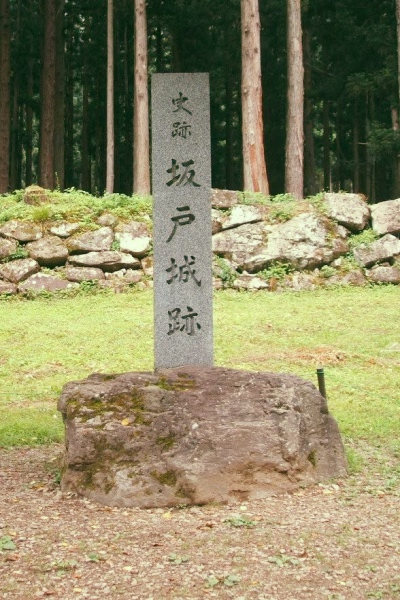
- Site of Sakado Castle

Site information
- Type: yamajiro-style Japanese castle
- Open to the public: yes
- Condition: ruins

Location
- Coordinates: 37°03′32.65″N 138°53′54.21″E

Site history
- Built: c.1400
- In use: Muromachi-Sengoku period
- Demolished: 1608

Sakado Castle (坂戸城, Sakado-jō) was a Sengoku period yamajiro-style Japanese castle located in the Muikamachi neighborhood of the city of Minamiuonuma, Niigata Prefecture, in the Hokuriku region of Japan. The ruins have been protected as a National Historic Site since 1979.

== Background ==
Sakado Castle is located on Mount Sakado, a 634-meter peak on a ridge to the east of central Minamiounuma. The area is a long and narrow river basin along the Uono River, a major tributary of the Shinano River, near the border of Echigo Province with the Kantō region. The Mikuni kaidō was an important road connecting Echigo with the Kantō area, and the modern Kan-Etsu Expressway and the Jōetsu Shinkansen still utilise this route.

During the early Muromachi period, Shōgun Ashikaga Takauji appointed the Uesugi clan as shugo of Echigo Province. However, the Uesugi preferred to remain new the centre of political power and assigned the province to the Nagao clan to rule as deputy governors. However, the Nagao clan was split into three houses: The Fuchū-Nagao clan based at what is now Jōetsu, the Koshi-Nagao clan based at what is now Nagaoka and the Ueda-Nagao clan based in what is now Uonuma. As Jōetsu was the site of the ancient provincial capital of the province, the Fuchū-Nagao clan has the highest position, and the other branches were its retainers. A castle was built at Sakado by the Ueda-Nagano clan sometime in the late 14th century.

== Structure ==
Sakado Castle, as was common with mountain-top fortifications of the time, consisted of many narrow terraces (kuruwa) spread across several levels on the side of the mountain. A circular inner bailey with a diameter of approximately 20 meters was created near the highest point of the mountain. The area was later fortified with stone walls. The ridge of Mount Sakado has a second peak towards the southeast with a height almost as high as the inner bailey. This peak was also flatted off to form a bailey with a large watchtower. The two sectors were connected by a narrow pathway approximately 100 meters long on the top of the ridge. As the slopes of Mount Sakado are very steep, and with sheer cliffs in place, the area formed a natural notification without need of many ramparts. The castle town and the residence of the ruler were located on the western hillside, and were protected by a water moat.

== History ==
Under the Muromachi shogunate, the Uesugi clan was appointed to the post of Kantō Kanrei, but through continuous warfare their situation was greatly weakened. In 1507, Nagao Tamekage of the Fuchū-Nagao cadet branch of the clan overthrew his Uesugi overlords. On his death in 1543, his son Nagao Harukage was unable to hold the clan together, and turned authority over to his brother, Kagetora, later known as Uesugi Kenshin. However, the Ueda-Nagao under Nagao Masakage initially opposed Kenshin and raised an army. He was defeated, but was allowed to pledge fealty to Kenshin, and was married to Kenshin's younger sister, Sento-in, after which the Ueda-Nagao clan contributed to Kenshin's campaigns against the Takeda clan and the Odawara Hōjō clan. In 1564, Masakage died in what may have been an accident, and his son, Akikage was adopted by Kenshin, becoming Uesugi Kagekatsu. Kenshin's sudden death in 1578 without having named an heir set the stage for another major conflict, the Siege of Otate, as Kenshin's other adopted son, Uesugi Kagetora also claimed the position of heir.

Kagekatsu was supported by Kenshin's closest guards and quickly captured Kasugayama Castle and the Ueda-Nagao rallied to his banner. However, Kagetora had the support of the most important retainers as well as backing by the Takeda and Hōjō clans, and isolated Kasugayama Castle from the Uonuma basin. In the summer of 1578, the Hōjō invaded Echigo in support of Kagetora while the Takeda invaded from Shinano Province. Unable to fight a war on two fronts, Kagekatsu quickly made a separate peace with the Takeda; however, the Hojo were able to lay siege to many of the border castles in the Uonuma region, including Sakado. The defenders were fortunate in that the Hōjō laid siege after the rice harvest had been competed. Furthermore, as the Uonuma area is a region of Japan with the heaviest snowfalls, the Hōjō armies suffered greatly once winter began, and as the snow began to disrupt their supply lines, they were forced to retreat. Kagekatsu was thus able to counterattack and reestablish the link between Kasugayama Castle and his main power base at Sakado. The following spring, in March 1579, Kagekatsu made a major offensive against Kagetora, taking his headquarters at Ōtate Castle. Kagetora fled to Samegao Castle, where he was betrayed and committed suicide.

Uesugi Kagekatsu was thus master of Echigo and undisputed head of the Uesugi clan, but the conflict had left the Uesugi clan greatly weakened, and he was forced to submit fealty to Toyotomi Hideyoshi. Sakado Castle continued to be used as a border fortification for Echigo. In 1598, the clan was transferred to Aizu on the orders of Hideyoshi and the province was given to Hori Hideharu. Hideharu placed Hori Naoyori as castellan of Sakado Castle. Naoyori made many modifications to the castle and the hillside residence. In 1608, he was transfer to become daimyō of Iida Domain in Shinano Province by the Tokugawa shogunate and Sakado Castle was abandoned.

== Current ==
The castle is now only ruins, with stone wall remains at the site of the residence at the foot of the mountain, a stone wall and a turret foundation at the actual castle on the summit, and the remains of earthworks and moats. The area is now a park with hiking courses and a Shinto shrine on the site of the former inner bailey. At the foot of the mountain is the Nagao Masakage Cemetery and a monument proclaiming the area to be the birthplace of Uesugi Kagekatsu and Naoe Kanetsugu. The site is about five minutes by car or 30 minutes on foot from Muikamachi Station on the JR East Jōetsu Line.

== See also ==
- List of Historic Sites of Japan (Niigata)

== Literature ==
- Schmorleitz, Morton S. (1974). Castles in Japan. Tokyo: Charles E. Tuttle Co. pp. 144–145. ISBN 0-8048-1102-4.
- Motoo, Hinago (1986). Japanese Castles. Tokyo: Kodansha. p. 200 pages. ISBN 0-87011-766-1.
- Mitchelhill, Jennifer (2004). Castles of the Samurai: Power and Beauty. Tokyo: Kodansha. p. 112 pages. ISBN 4-7700-2954-3.
- Turnbull, Stephen (2003). Japanese Castles 1540-1640. Osprey Publishing. p. 64 pages. ISBN 1-84176-429-9.
