= Battle of Tedorigawa =

1577 battle

Battle of Tetorigawa
- Part of the Sengoku period
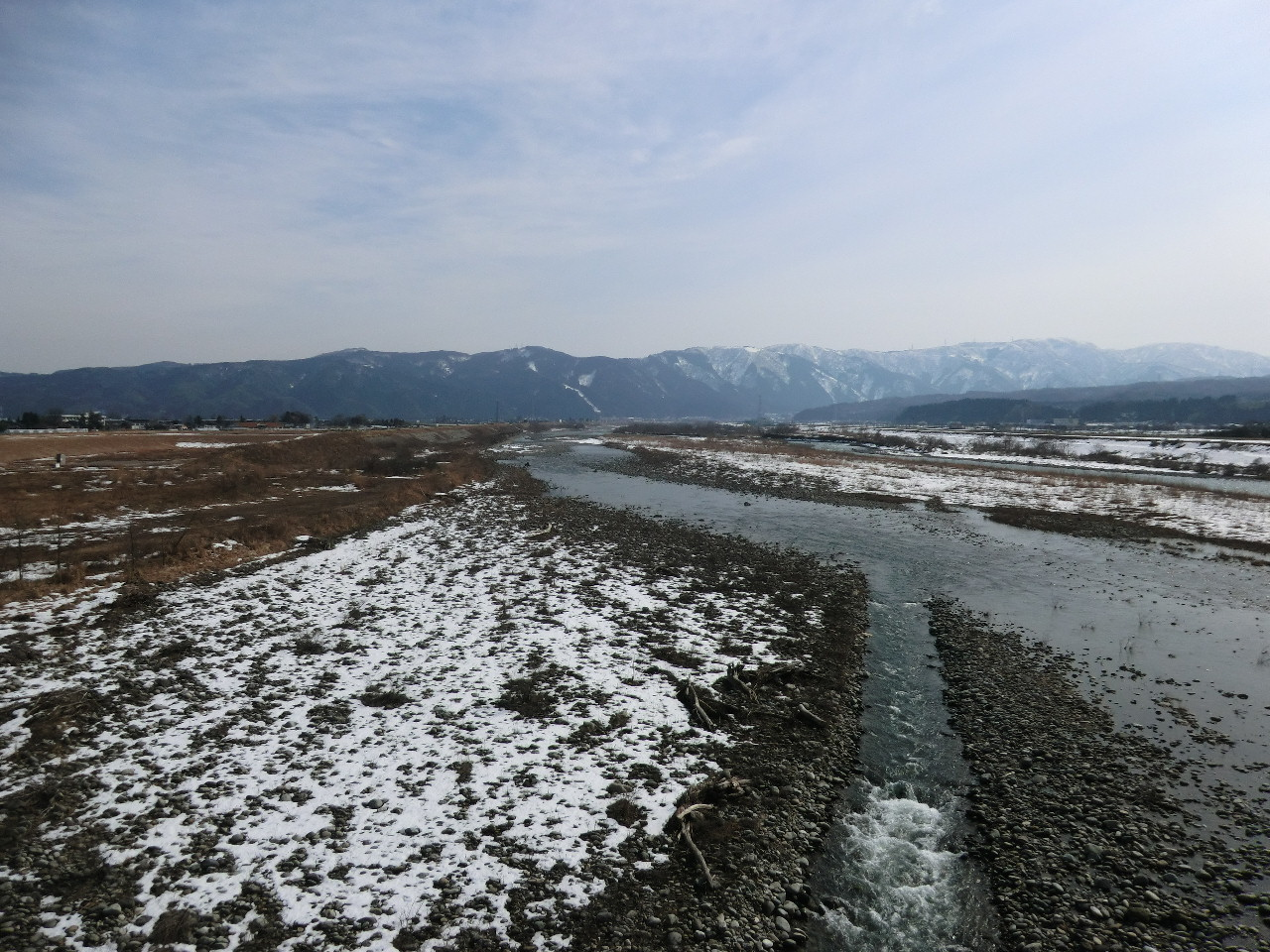
- Tetori river in 2012
Date	November 3, 1577
Location	Tedori River, Kaga Province 36°28′N 136°29′E
Result	Uesugi clan victory

Belligerents
Uesugi clan	Oda clan

Commanders and leaders
Uesugi Kenshin; Uesugi Kagetora; Uesugi Kagekatsu; Saitō Tomonobu; Shibata Naganori; Honjō Shigenaga; Jōjō Masashige; Naoe Kanetsugu; Yusa Tsugumitsu	Oda Nobunaga; Shibata Katsuie; Maeda Toshiie; Sassa Narimasa; Akechi Mitsuhide; Hashiba Hideyoshi; Ikeda Tsuneoki; Niwa Nagahide; Takigawa Kazumasu

Strength
30,000	50,000

Casualties and losses
Unknown	1,000 men, many more drowned
- Location within Ishikawa Prefecture Battle of Tedorigawa (Japan)

The Battle of Tetorigawa (手取川の戦い, Tetorigawa no Tatakai) took place near the Tetori River in Japan's Kaga Province in 1577, between the forces of Oda Nobunaga against Uesugi Kenshin. Kenshin tricked Nobunaga into launching a frontal attack across the Tedorigawa and defeated him. Having suffered the loss of 1,000 men, the Oda withdrew south. This is Uesugi Kenshin last battle, the battle site is in the modern-day Ishikawa Prefecture.

== Background ==
After Oda Nobunaga's victory at Nagashino, Uesugi Kenshin broke off his alliance with Oda Nobunaga and Tokugawa Ieyasu, he then initiated an alliance in 1575 with the Ishiyama Honganji warrior monks (Ikko Ikki) and Takeda Katsuyori of the Takeda clan, with whom he had previously been at odds.

The Tedorigawa Campaign was precipitated by an Uesugi intervention inside the domain of the Hatakeyama clan in Noto Province, an Oda client state. A coup d'état led by the pro-Oda General Chō Shigetsura, killed Hatakeyama Yoshinori, the lord of Noto, and replaced him with Hatakeyama Yoshitaka, a puppet ruler. In response, Uesugi Kenshin, the head of the Uesugi clan, mobilized an army and lead them into Noto against Shigetsura.

Consequently, Nobunaga sent an army led by Shibata Katsuie and Maeda Toshiie; with some of his most experienced generals to reinforce their allies.

Kenshin, taking the initiative moved to encircle Shigetsura's forces, preventing them from linking with the Oda army, and trapping Chō Shigetsura (Tsunatsura) in Nanao Castle (the main Hatakeyama stronghold in Noto Province). The subsequent breakthrough killed Shigetsura and resulted in the Hatakeyama of Noto switching allegiance to the Uesugi.

== Battle ==
The Oda forces under the command of Shibata Katsuie, Maeda Toshiie, and Sassa Narimasa crossed the Tedori River (Minatogawa or Tedorigawa) and prepared to enter Noto Province, as they did not yet know about the fall of Nanao Castle. Due to the fall of Nanao Castle and Suemori Castle in Noto, the Oda army (now joined by Nobunaga himself) halted their march into Noto and went back across the Tedori River.

Uesugi Kenshin, now bolstered in his ranks with Hatakeyama Noto troops, advanced towards the Oda position. The Oda army came up with a plan to use cannons for stand-off tactics against the Uesugi and to bombard the Uesugi from across the river.

However, a skillful night-time feint by Kenshin (suggesting he had divided his forces) led to Nobunaga ordering Katsuie to charge against the Uesugi lines and engaging the Uesugi troops on the river bank. Kenshin ordered the river's floodgates to be opened. The strong current from the river and perhaps also some rainfall prevented the Oda clan from effectively using its arquebus and cannons. The Oda charge itself was repulsed due to the current and inferior close-quarter ability of the ashigaru making up the bulk of the Oda army; the troops of the Oda were being pushed into the river.

Having lost a thousand men in combat and some more as the Oda troops attempted to escape across the Tedori river, Nobunaga ordered a retreat into Ōmi Province.

== Aftermath ==
Kenshin brought his army back into Noto province and ordered the repair of Nanao Castle as he himself went back into home province, Echigo. The Uesugi scored a significant victory at Tedorigawa. As a result, the distribution of power in the central north shifted towards Kenshin and the Uesugi were temporarily able to extend their influence as far as Kaga Province.

There seems to be some debate among scholars as to Kenshin's next moves, however letters written by Kenshin seem to suggest that Kenshin did not perceive the Oda as a significant threat for the time being, although it could have been that Kenshin's true intentions were hidden. In these letters to Kanto samurai, Kenshin suggested that his next moves would have been an offensive against the Hojo in Kanto and not towards Kyoto at that time. In letters written by Oda Nobunaga, Nobunaga suggested that he was willing to cede all of the northern provinces to the Uesugi in order to avoid Uesugi advance upon Kyoto.

In 1578, Kenshin died before any plan was initiated. Subsequently, the Uesugi's succession fell in the Siege of Otate. As a result, by 1582 the Oda forces had managed to push the Uesugi clan all the way back to Echigo Province.
