= Jōjō Masashige =

Jōjō Masashige (上条 政繁) (1545 – September 25, 1643) was a Japanese samurai of the Sengoku period through the Edo period, who served the Uesugi clan.

In 1576, in order to promote stability in Noto Province, Jōjō Masashige was backed as the next head of the Hatakeyama clan, who had earlier been tendered by the Hatakeyama as hostage.

In 1577, Masashige fought at the Battle of Tedorigawa and brought victory to many of his allies by mobilizing his troops to Etchu and Kozuke.

In 1578, after the death of his previous lord, Uesugi Kenshin, he became quite at odds with the new successor and son of Kenshin, Uesugi Kagekatsu.

Masashige served both Uesugi Kenshin as well as Uesugi Kagekatsu. In the Siege of Otate, he supported Uesugi Kagetora at first but later switched to Kagekatsu. After the battle, he suddenly left the Uesugi clan.
