= Mirage of Blaze =

Book by Mizuna Kuwabara

- DVD cover for Mirage of Blaze: The Complete Collection

炎の蜃気楼 (Honō no Mirāju)
- Genre: Fantasy, Action
- Light novel
- Written by: Mizuna Kuwabara
- Illustrated by: Kazumi Toujou (novels 1-11); Shouko Hamada (novels 12-40)
- Published by: Shueisha
- Magazine: Cobalt
- Original run: November 2, 1990 – April, 2004
- Volumes: 40
- Manga
- Written by: Mizuna Kuwabara
- Illustrated by: Shouko Hamada
- Published by: Hakusensha
- Magazine: Serie Mystery
- Original run: October 1994 – June 1997
- Volumes: 4
- Anime television series
- Directed by: Susumu Kudo
- Produced by: Yumiko Masujima
- Written by: Hiroko Tokita; Kazuyuki Fudeyasu; Ryosuke Nakamura; Yuki Enatsu
- Music by: Koichiro Kameyama
- Studio: Madhouse (Note: Animation production assistance (アニメーション制作協力) for all episodes provided by Studio Matrix.)
- Licensed by: US: Media Blasters
- Original network: Kids Station
- English network: US: Encore Action, Encore WAM
- Original run: January 7, 2002 – April 8, 2002
- Episodes: 13
- Original video animation

Mirage of Blaze: Rebels of the River Edge
- Directed by: Fumie Muroi
- Produced by: Yuichiro Sato
- Written by: Kazuyuki Fudeyasu
- Music by: Koichiro Kameyama
- Studio: Madhouse
- Licensed by: US: Media Blasters
- Released: July 28, 2004 – November 26, 2004
- Runtime: 31 minutes
- Episodes: 3
- Manga

Mirage of Blaze R
- Written by: Mizuna Kuwabara
- Illustrated by: Shouko Hamada
- Published by: Akita Shoten
- Magazine: Mystery Bonita
- Original run: August 2020 – present
- Volumes: 7

Mirage of Blaze (炎の蜃気楼(ミラージュ), Honō no Mirāju) is a Japanese light novel series written by Mizuna Kuwabara, published under Shueisha's Cobalt label. It had over 6.83 million copies in circulation as of January 2018. There were plans to establish the Mirage of Blaze Museum (炎の蜃気楼 記念館) in Yonezawa in 2007, but the project was eventually cancelled.

Mirage of Blaze is considered a milestone in the boys' love (male-male romance) genre, although it is not officially categorized as a boys' love series. Its narrative style, characterized by mature themes and action-oriented storytelling, represented a significant break from the prevailing yaoi genre conventions at the time, which typically focused on romance and eroticism between male characters. The series is also regarded as one of the early examples of a work that inspired the practice of seichi junrei, a form of pop culture tourism or film tourism. From the outset of its serialization, Mirage of Blaze has been supported by a dedicated fan base that frequently make visits to locations featured as backgrounds and settings for the series, including temples, shrines, and historical landmarks. This phenomenon came to be called "Mirage Tour (ミラージュ・ツアー)", and resulted in a significant economic benefits for the regions involved.

The novel is renowned for its distinctive writing style, described as "a series of poetic yet sharp portrayals flowing like an uninterrupted, unlimited torrent". The thoughts, feelings, and motivations of characters are well captured in its meticulous and intense depictions, which become increasingly longer as the series progresses. This narrative mode, commonly referred to as "Kuwabara style (桑原節)" among fans, is usually in the form of an interior monologue and a dialogue.

The original series consists of 40 volumes and 7 extras (1990–2007). The main story is divided into four parts: the first part (volumes 1–12), the second part (volumes 13–20), the third part (volumes 21–28), and the fourth part (volumes 29–40). Two extras, Fragment - For You, My Beloved (volume 5.5) and Fragment - Abandoned Suffering (volume 20.5), are closely connected to the main story, making them essential for a full understanding of the series. Three gaiden (or side-story) prequels have been made: Honō no Mirage: Kaikou-Hen set in Sengoku period which consisted of 14 volumes (1999–2013), Honō no Mirage: Bakumatsu-Hen set in Edo period and had a total of 2 volumes (2009–2013), and Honō no Mirage: Shouwa-Hen set in Shouwa period with a total of 11 volumes (2014–2017).

== Synopsis ==
=== Setting ===
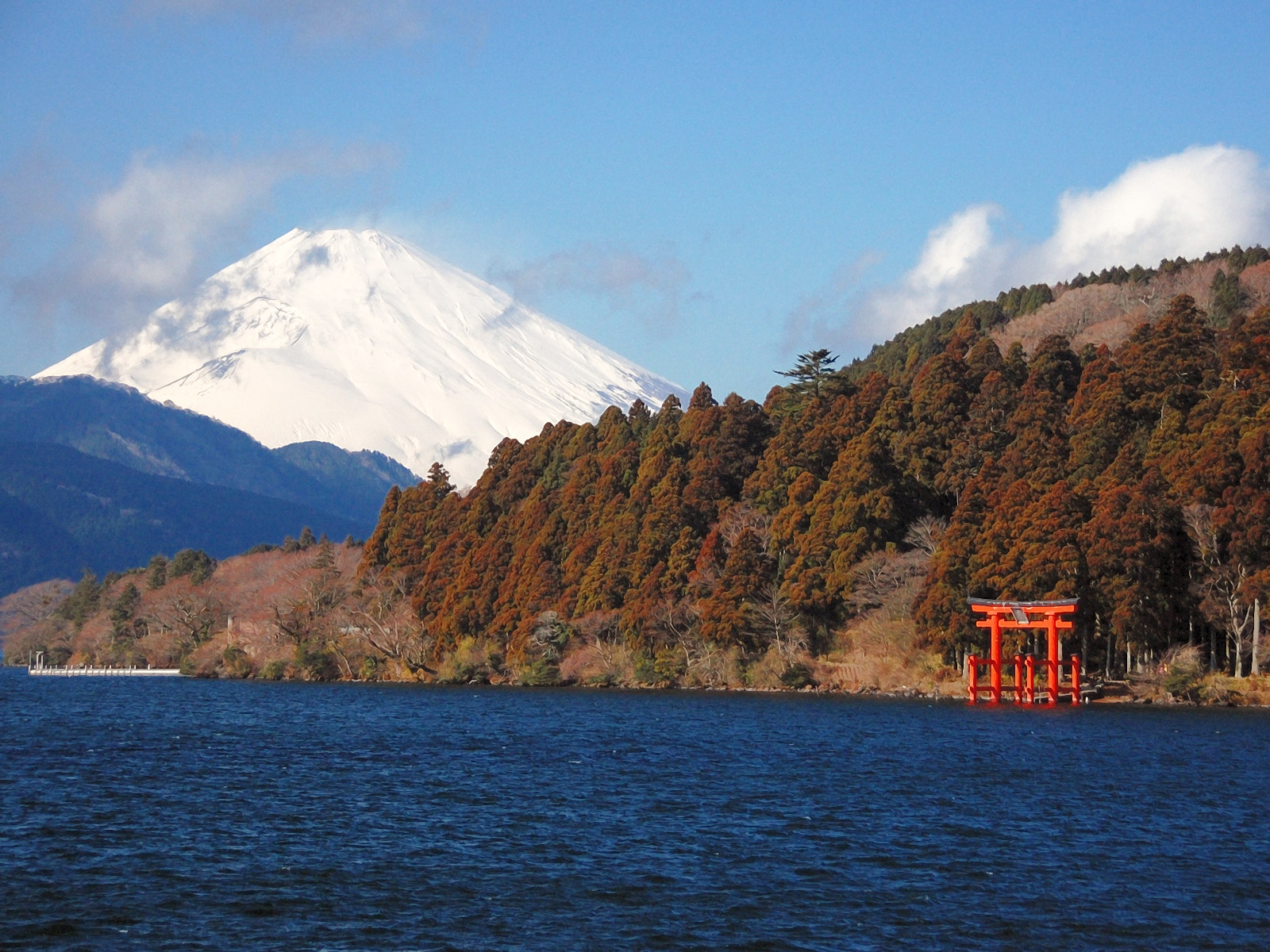
Lake Ashi and the Torii Gate of Hakone Shinto Shrine, featured in the episode of The Supreme Ruler's Demonic Mirror.

The story is set in 1990s Japan, where the spirits of historical clans possess modern individuals and battle for supremacy, while influencing the land of the living. This war, unseen to the average human being, called the Feudal Underworld. While many central characters originate from the Sengoku era, the series also features characters from various periods of Japanese history, spanning from ancient to modern times. In this world, supernatural elements, deeply rooted in Buddhist beliefs and Japanese folk spirituality, play a vital role. Numerous mystical creatures, such as Tengu, Yatagarasu, and Tsutsuga (a tiger-like beast), appear alongside mystical artifacts, such as the Three Sacred Treasures, mandalas, and Retsumyousei, a meteorite with magical power. The narrative begins in Matsumoto, a city in Nagano, before expands to various locations across the entire country, including Kyoto, Nikko, Kamakura, Aso, and Shikoku Island.

==== Kanshou (換生) ====
The story centers on the Yashashuu (夜叉衆), a group of exorcists who have lived for over 400 years to continue their fight against vengeful spirits. They are known as Kanshousha (換生者), individuals who can be reborn with their memories intact through a process called Kanshou, in which a spirit possesses a living person, expelling the host's soul and taking over the body. They generally perform Kanshou on a fetus, as the host has not yet developed a sense of identity or formed connections with others.

The Yashashuu are described as experiencing guilt over living lives that were not originally their own, while often questioning the purpose of their prolonged existence and expressing a sense of fatigue with immortality. The story examines the ethical implications of their existence: Although protecting the living through exorcisms, they must continue taking over living people's bodies to keep themselves alive, and although also being dead themselves, they must continue to battle other dead people.

==== Ryoku (力) ====
The supernatural power, called the Ryoku, is broadly divided into two categories: the power of telekinesis (念動力), which causes change in the state and motion of a substance, and the power of spiritual waves (霊波力), which affects the consciousness, mind, and soul of a target. The power of telekinesis includes abilities such as waves of will (念波), waves of body-protection (護身波), and barrier (結界), while the power of spiritual waves includes abilities such as telepathy (思念波), spiritual investigation (霊査), and hypnosis (催眠). Each ability is further divided into various types.

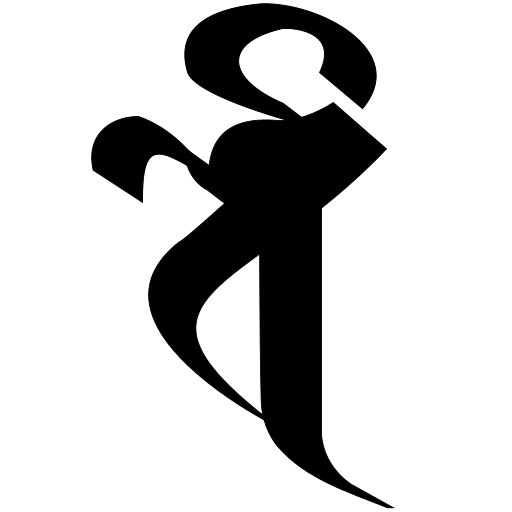
Vai or Bai ー the seed syllable mantra of Bishamonten (Vaiśravaṇa).

Choubuku (調伏), one form of the power of spiritual waves, is an ability used to exorcise vengeful spirits. It is a special power granted to the Yashashuu by their guardian deity, Bishamonten (毘沙門天), who is the god of war and wealth, the punisher of evildoers, and the commander of the Yasha (夜叉) and Rasetsu (羅刹). There are various types of Choubuku, each beginning with the incantation "bai", the seed syllable mantra of Bishamonten, and a specific hand gesture, the mudra of Bishamonten. These are followed by different spells, depending on the type of Choubuku performed. Throughout the series, the spells usually appear as Buddhist chants such as mantras and dharanis, or Shinto chants like norito.

=== Plot ===
Takaya Ougi, a high school student, wants nothing more than to protect his best friend Yuzuru Narita and live a normal life. That is, until Nobutsuna Naoe, an intense and charismatic man, informs Takaya that he is in fact the 400-year-old Kanshousha, or soul reborn through time with memories intact, of Kagetora Uesugi, the adopted son of a feudal lord, Kenshin Uesugi. Naoe, who is also a Kanshousha, reawakens Takaya's abilities to exorcise evil spirits and fight the Feudal Underworld, a collection of restless warrior spirits bent on modern-day conquest. While Kanshousha generally remember their former lives, Takaya is the one who doesn't because he sealed his own memories when he was reborn into his current body, and is often hostile towards any effort for the complete recovery of his memory. As the plot unfolds, the complex history of the characters and their past suggests why this is so, and the true nature of the tempestuous and somewhat ambiguous relationship between the two leads provides the backdrop for a melodrama that spans several generations of Japanese history. As they ascend to the living world to renew their ancient war, Naoe, Takaya, and other members of Yashashuu, the Uesugi clan's most powerful group of exorcists and supernatural warriors, gear up to prevent that from happening.

==== Past Storyline ====
Kagetora Uesugi was an adopted son of Kenshin Uesugi, a feudal lord in the 16th century. After Kenshin's death, Kagetora fought with Kagekatsu, also an adopted son of Kenshin, over the succession to the clan leadership. Kagetora was ultimately defeated and died. Naoe served as a retainer to Kagekatsu, which placed him in opposition to Kagetora and made him indirectly responsible for Kagetora's death. He also died later.

After their deaths, Kagetora and Naoe became vengeful spirits. However, Kenshin persuaded them to accept a duty to exorcise other vengeful spirits and bring peace to the living world. They were brought back to life through Kanshou, becoming a liege/retainer relationship by Kenshin's order. At first, they harbored mutual hostility. Later, Naoe came to love Kagetora, though he also experienced intense envy toward him, as Kagetora was seen as a charismatic and natural leader whom Naoe felt he could never match. Naoe viewed Kagetora as a “winner” and became increasingly fixated on surpassing him. Kagetora refused to accept Naoe's love because he believed it stemmed from Naoe's desire to overcome his inferiority complex by physically dominating him, and because he had not forgiven Naoe for his role in his death. Another reason was his deep sexual trauma: he had been raped by several men when he was young in his first life.

Despite this, Kagetora was emotionally dependent on Naoe and felt unable to live without him. Suffering from low self-esteem, he only felt a sense of superiority or fulfillment through Naoe's love and complex. To keep Naoe by his side without accepting his love, Kagetora constantly invoked the lingering guilt Naoe felt over his indirect role in Kagetora's death, and continued their exorcism duties for nearly 400 years while disregarding Naoe's emotional state. Eventually, Naoe became mentally and emotionally exhausted, leading to a series of harmful actions toward Minako Kitazato, which caused significant psychological distress to Kagetora. Soon after, Kagetora died with fatal wounds to the soul by enemy attacks, and then chose to disappear from everyone he had known, particularly Naoe. Over the next 30 years, Naoe fell into despair, uncertain whether Kagetora's soul had been destroyed, until he finally found Takaya, who is the Kanshousha of Kagetora, although he had no memory of his past lives, as he sealed them himself when he was reborn into his current body.

==== OVA ====
The OVA Rebels of the River Edge (2003) has animated the book with same title. The OVA resumes the plot of the anime television series, yet incorporates several new developments, among them the question of unswerving loyalty and personal honor. Takaya is sent to Kyoto to investigate the re-awakening of the Ikko sect and Murashige Araki, a one time member of the Ikkō sect who has since deserted the clan. With the help of his vassal and fellow possessor Haruie, the two are successful in tracking him down, only to discover that Murashige is after a 400-year-old mandala (a Buddhist ritualistic artifact and meditative aid) made of the hair of the deceased Araki clansmen. Unfortunately, by the time they meet up with Murashige, Haruie recognizes him as Shintarou, her former lover in a past life. Whether it's true or not, and despite the confusing emotional complication of this development, Takaya orders Haruie to eliminate Murashige once he becomes a true threat to the balance of power. Meanwhile, Takaya finally reunites with Naoe after a prolonged period of estrangement. Unresolved sexual and psychological tension dominates their initial exchange, and it's uncertain whether these two powerful possessors will resolve their differences and work together against this latest threat.

== Characters ==
Takaya Ougi (仰木 高耶, Ōgi Takaya)
Voiced by: Toshihiko Seki (Japanese); Richard Cansino (English)
A lonely 17-year-old high school delinquent from Jyohoku High School who finds out that he's actually the 400-year-old Kanshousha of Kagetora Uesugi, despite having repressed the memories of his prior existence due to a traumatic incident. When he was a junior high-school student, he was a famous juvenile delinquent at Matsumoto since he rebelled against his alcoholic father. Abrupt and outspoken in demeanor, he defiantly and exhaustingly denies the fact that he is Kagetora, refusing to believe that he is anyone but Takaya. He nonetheless exhibits a highly moral attitude towards his newfound duty as a "possessor" once he accepts the reality of his past. Through the course of the series, he develops a minor split personality, confusing his ancient persona with his current persona (i.e. Takaya Ohgi vs. Kagetora Uesugi). All of the Uesugi possessors, as well as close friends, call him "Takaya" unless he's in his Kagetora persona, save Naoe who always calls him "Lord Kagetora" as a mark of their master/vassal relationship. He's a very powerful magic user, capable of exorcising spirits and demons and constructing an energy barrier against attack. He has a strong conviction and is stubborn, though he hides his vulnerably delicate mind with a bluff. Although he has serious misanthropy, he's incredibly defenseless and innocent toward man who he trusted. He's eager for a father figure and mentor, and tends to trust an older man. Takaya begins to trust and love Naoe due to his protection despite himself, and although he knows he may just be a substitute for Kagetora. Takaya becomes a wise, noble and charismatic leader after he regains Kagetora's memories, but it also begins a deep discord with Naoe due to an event 30 years in the past. Takaya becomes intent on "winning" or keeping the upper hand against Naoe although there is a strange attraction between them. However, due to the fact Takaya (as Kagetora) was raped by his foster lord's vassals when he was in Hojo clan, he hates sexual intercourse. At the end of the novel's part 1 "Youkihi the Sea Goddess", the situation has changed after Naoe's soul was damaged and can no longer use any power, including the ability to possess a new host. Takaya is disturbed by the idea that Naoe's death could be permanent, and his spirit be lost forever. Then he shows intense affection for Naoe, unleashing a powerful display of protective magic due to his fury that the Mori clan had taken Naoe hostage. In the end, Naoe protects him and died causing Takaya to lose his sanity however. However, when he seals his feelings on the advice of his real father, Ujiyasu Hojo's soul, he is able to beat his enemies. Then, he believed Kotaro is Naoe since he wakes up.

Yoshiaki Tachibana (橘 義明, Tachibana Yoshiaki)
Voiced by: Shō Hayami (Japanese); Jamieson Price (English), Voiced by: Kōji Tsujitani (2nd Drama CD)
The current incarnation of Nobutsuna Naoe. He is the third son of the Tachibana family and is a monk of Shingon-shu Buzan-ha at the Kougenji temple in Utsunomiya. He always wears a black suit with a black tie as Japanese mourning dress by reason of the sympathy for the dead person; he is also shown to occasionally smoke cigarettes whenever he's not working. He owns three different cars-(one in dark green, one in white, and one in black). He is approximately eleven years older than Takaya-(making him around 28 years old), and much more methodical and deliberate in his methods. Intense and understated in speech, he nonetheless harbors a passionate and rebellious nature beneath his veneer of docility and allegiance. He and his family are known to be quite wealthy, partially because his older brother manages a real estate company. Naoe wields a similar form of energy magic and is capable of sensing demonic or supernatural auras. He can also make others possess a person's bodies compulsorily. Takaya and all other members of the Uesugi clan call him "Naoe". He was a subordinate of Kagekatsu Uesugi who killed Kagetora. However, he has become a servant of Kagetora by command of Kenshin Uesugi 400 years ago. Initially, he and Kagetora hated one another. He has since come to love Kagetora deeply-(even to the point where he harbors a romantic/sexual attraction to him), although he has jealousy and an inferiority complex towards "genius" Kagetora. He showed on several occasions that he would do anything to make him. He's deeply attached to the relationship between "winner" and "loser", and wishes to win against Kagetora who he perceives the "winner". In his previous life, he raped and impregnated Minako Kitazato, Kagetora's fiancé. Moreover, he forced Kagetora's spirit to possess Minako's body. Kagetora's body was killed in the fight against Oda who was eventually killed as well. Naoe regretted this misdeed and has become suicidal since Kagetora's next reincarnation was not found. Naoe behaves like a guardian and mentor to Takaya/Lord Kagetora, but he is afraid of losing Takaya's trust when the other regains his memories. However, he cannot control his suppressed desires - love, hate, and agony- and he almost rapes Takaya who regains his memories in shock. At the end of the novel's part 1 "Youkihi the Sea Goddess", his soul has suffered damage because he used his supernatural powers without rest while he was emotionally unstable. Naoe then lost his powers and his eyesight for a short time. He is held hostage by the Mori clan and he was suggested that he join to the Mori clan by Motoharu Kikkawa who felt pity for him. He confessed he wanted to be killed by Takaya while surrounded by flames, but he was persuaded by Takaya and reconciled with him. However, he protects Takaya from a bullet which Terumoto Mori fired. His eyes met those of Takaya and he dies. In the book: part 2, it's revealed that he was saved by Kenshin, and he manipulated body of Makoto Kaizaki, descendant of the Satomi clan, by his mortally wounded body, uses spirit synchronization. In both the manga and anime series-(including the OVA) it's strongly implied that Naoe is bisexual.

Shuhei Chiaki (千秋 修平, Chiaki Shūhei)
Voiced by: Yasunori Matsumoto (Japanese); Lex Lang (English)
The current incarnation of Nagahide Yasuda, two years older than Takaya, and on the surface a typical high school student. He is a possessor and magic user, but apparently also has the ability to alter the perceptions and memories of others. He use items called Koppa-jin. His combat ability is most strong after Kagetora, he regarded Kagetora as his rival, not his vassal. All the Uesugi clan possessors call him by his ancient name "Nagahide", save Takaya who calls him by his current name, "Chiaki". His arrival in the series is accompanied by his sudden and mysterious appearance in Takaya's homeroom as his "best friend." His loyalty to the Uesugi clan is at first questionable, since his whereabouts and intentions were unknown before his abrupt arrival in Takaya's life. He has a laid back personality and is slow to anger, and is concentrated and precise in combat. He's also considerate person, and he doesn't hesitate about help to help the weak and friend although he don't want to acknowledge it. Like Naoe, he belonged to the faction of Kagekatsu Uesugi when he was alive. Unlike other Uesugi clan that possession to fetus as possible, he possessed to a handsome young man because he hated his ancient ugly-looking. Though he says that he abandoned "Ultimate Bakappuru", he makes every effort to do help them at the risk of his life.

Ayako Kadowaki (門脇 綾子, Kadowaki Ayako)
Voiced by: Sakiko Tamagawa (Japanese); Julie Ann Taylor (English)
The current incarnation of Haruie Kakizaki, originally male. Somewhere in her past, whether by accident or design, she switched gender. She is a female college student about 21 years of age who rides a Yamaha FZR400 motorcycle called "Ecchan". Despite her decidedly feminine appearance, everyone calls her by "Haruie". She save Takaya who calls her by her current name "Ayako-neesan". She is easy going and friendly with a bit of a competitive streak. When she first meets Takaya, she challenges him to a motorcycle race and beats him easily. She is a powerful exorcist and dependable in combat, and has great magic power to identify a soul. She worshiped Kagetora since she/he was alive. Haruie formerly hated Naoe who was Kagetora's enemy and has assassinated himself at 400 years ago; first possession, but they trust each other now. She quarrels with Chiaki well but she gets along well with him, and they are perfect pair when they make fun of Naoe in particular. In the OVA series, Rebels of the River Edge (2003), her past experiences are developed in greater detail. 200 years ago, Haruie fall in love with young doctor Shintaro Sone when she was reborn in female form. However, Shintaro's died. She has been waiting for his reincarnation after what is to believe his promise. She is also the former lover of Araki before his death many years ago.

Yuzuru Narita (成田 譲, Narita Yuzuru)
Voiced by: Taiki Matsuno (Japanese); Tony Schnur (English), Voiced by: Shinnosuke Furumoto (Tokimeki Telephone)
The best friend of Takaya. He's always calm and good student, he's keeping an open mind and is tends to say poignant. He showed a strong psychic power sometimes. Yuzuru gets to know Takaya when he intended to kill his alcoholic father, he understood the mind of Takaya and supported him. Kosaka foretold he is "the menace of six realms". It's revealed Yuzuru is the reincarnation of Maitreya, and also Kagekatsu Uesugi.

Danjo Kousaka (高坂 弾正, Kōsaka Danjō)
Voiced by: Kenyū Horiuchi (Japanese); Lex Lang (English), Voiced by: Jūrōta Kosugi (2nd Drama CD), Voiced by: Kaneto Shiozawa (Tokimeki Telephone)
The current name is Kimihiko Arai, who is college student. Shingen Takeda's mistress, and he belongs to Takeda clan. He's familiar with the circumstances of the Uesugi clan for some reason, then he makes fun of Naoe and enjoys it. He shows loyalty to Takeda clan, but he seems to have another purpose. He is elusive, always sarcastic, a proud person. He has legendary yōkai Nue that's good at data collection to his subordinates. He repeats possession like the Uesugi clan, has also great magic power to identify a soul. Despite his masculine physique, he is shown to have dark shoulder length hair that is usually kept down and even wears lipstick.

Katsunaga Irobe (色部 勝長, Irobe Katsunaga)

The oldest member of the Uesugi clan. He appears after Part 2 in the book; because he possessed to a baby at Part 1. He has loyalty to Kenshin Uesugi and is calm, judicious person. In "Kaikou-hen" that the pre-sequel set in Japan 400 years ago, he exorcised the evil spirit of Kagetora that cursed his violent death, then he welcomed Kagetora who's guided by the soul of Kenshin. he has trouble with the arbitration of the Uesugi clan that hated each other, because members except for him made war against each other since they divided into the Kagetora vs. Kagekatsu factions before they died.

Satoshi Hatayama (波多山 智, Hatayama Satoshi)
Voiced by: Tomokazu Seki (Japanese); Steve Cannon (English)
Yuzuru's junior in his club activities. He is half Japanese and half white. It's revealed he is the current incarnation of Ranmaru Mori, Nobunaga Oda's lover.

Nobunaga Oda (織田 信長, Oda Nobunaga)
Voiced by: Ryōtarō Okiayu (Japanese); Doug Stone (English)
Uesugi clan's biggest enemy. The possessed of Eiji Shiba, known as the leader of the popular rock band "SEEVA" at later. He wants to take over the world by "Yami-Sengoku". He uses magic power to destroy the souls, also can makes the miraculous stone that make a man into his own slave. He killed Kagetora and Naoe in the battle 30 years ago.
Minako Kitazato (北里 美奈子, Kitazato Minako)

Voiced by: Miho Yoshida (Japanese); Michelle Ruff (English)

The fiance of Kagetora 30 years ago. She is related to an event that's attribution of discord between Kagetora and Naoe. She also appears in the pre-sequel, "Showa-hen".
Kojiro Date (伊達 小次郎, Date Kojiro)
Voiced by: Hiroshi Kamiya (Japanese); Jim Taggert (Episodes 5-7), Peter Doyle (English)

Kagetsuna Katakura (片倉 景綱, Katakura Kagetsuna)
Voiced by: Fumihiko Tachiki (Japanese); Michael Forest (English)
The right-hand man of Lord Kojiro's father.
Ujiteru Hojo (北条 氏照, Hojō Ujiteru)
Voiced by: Hideyuki Tanaka (Japanese); Dave Mallow (English)
The real third brother of Kagetora. He calls Kagetora by Kagetora's former name, "Saburō". He care about Kagetora who sent in hostage to Uesugi clan, and want to take back him. He enter the war on Yami-Sengoku with his elder brother, Ujimasa Hojo. He suggested to Takaya that he's back in Hojo clan.

Kotaro Fuma (風魔 小太郎, Fūma Kotarō)
Voiced by: Mitsuru Miyamoto (Japanese); Johnny Yong Bosch (English)
The Fūma ninja serving to Hojo clan. He is faithful to an order, is always expressionless and has no emotion like a robot. At the book: part 2, he pretends to be Naoe as Takaya wishes it though he plays awkwardly him.

Shigeharu Hazama (狭間 繁治, Hazama Shigeharu)
Voiced by: Kōji Ishii (Japanese); George C. Cole (English)
The chairman of Hazama Confectionary.

Araki Murashige (荒木 村重, Murashige Araki)
Voiced by: Hozumi Gōda (Japanese); Steve Cannon (English)
The lost lover of Haruie who was said to have died many years ago-(however this is revealed to be a lie). He is also a member of the Ikko sect who deserted the clan long ago. With the help of his vassal Haruie, Takaya is finally successful in tracing him down who hunts down a 400-years-old mandala (a Buddhist artifact made for meditating) that was made out of the hair of the deceased Araki clansmen.

Rairen Shimozuma (下間 頼廉, Shimozuma Rairen)
Voiced by: Hiroki Tōchi (Japanese); Kim Strauss (English)
A client of Shigeharu and an old friend of Naoe's from college who offered him the mysterious mandala. His real last name is revealed to be Shimozuna-(シモズマ). It is said that many members of his clan had mysteriously vanished which caused him to "sense something very suspicious".

Saori Morino (森野 紗織, Morino Saori)
Voiced by: Akiko Yajima (Japanese); Colleen Villard (English)
The classmate of Takaya. She has crush on Yuzuru. She is an active, brisk and self-assured person.

Yuiko Takeda (武田 ゆいこ, Takeda Yuiko)
Voiced by: Ai Orikasa (Japanese); Mari Devon (English)

Miya Ohgi (仰木 美弥, Ōgi Miya)
Voiced by: Tomoko Miura (Japanese); Kari Wahlgren (English), Voiced by: Tange Sakura (Drama CD and Tokimeki Telephone)
The sister of Takaya. An innocent, mollycoddle, sweet girl. Takaya never wants to make her have a dangerous experience.

Teruhiro Tachibana (橘 照弘, Tachibana Teruhiro)
Voiced by: Hideyuki Tanaka (Tokimeki Telephone)
The eldest brother of Yoshiaki Tachibana. He runs the real estate company without inheriting the Kougenji temple, and he drives Yoshiaki hard as his secretary and his driver. He and his family worries about terribly nihilistic Yoshiaki that wanted to die since when he was young.

Yoshiaki Mogami (最上 義光, Mogami Yoshiaki)

Yoshiyasu Mogami (最上 義康, Mogami Yoshiyasu)

Nagi Shiohara (塩原 なぎ, Shiohara Nagi)

Narimasa Sassa (佐々 成政, Sassa Narimasa)

Maiko Asaoka (浅岡 麻衣子, Asaoka Maiko)

Rairyuu Shimozuma (下間 頼竜, Shimozuma Rairyū)

Makoto Kaizaki (開崎 誠, Kaizaki Makoto)

Reiko Nikaidou (二階堂 麗子, Nikaidō Reiko)

Juri Mikuriya (御厨 樹里, Mikuriya Juri)

Koichi Nezu (根津 耕市, Nezu Kōichi)

Ayukawa (鮎川, Ayukawa)

Ushio Muto (武藤 潮, Mutō Ushio)

Reijirou Kada (嘉田 嶺次郎, Kada Reijirō)

Kamon Nakagawa (中川 掃部, Nakagawa Kamon)

Seibei Kusama (草間 清兵衛, Kusama Seibē)

Chikamune Akutagawa (芥川 親宗, Akutagawa Chikamune)

Hayato Hyoudou (兵頭 隼人, Hyōdō Hayato)

Kogenta Higaki (檜垣 小源太, Higaki Kogenta)

Miho (ミホ, Miho)

Ichizou Katsuragi (葛城 一蔵, Katsuragi Ichizō)

Neiha (寧波, Neiha)

Seigetsu (青月, Seigetsu)

Rei Motomiya (本宮 礼, Motomiya Rei)

Kaoru Shigeno (重野 カオル, Shigeno Kaoru)

Teru Isomura (磯村 テル, Isomura Teru)

Takaya Torigoe (鳥越 隆也, Torigoe Takaya)

Motoharu Kikkawa (吉川 元春, Kikkawa Motoharu)

Mitsuhide Akechi (明智 光秀, Akechi Mitsuhide)

Shingo Kanemitsu (兼光 晋吾, Kanemitsu Shingo)

== Related Media ==
=== Anime ===
The novels were partially adapted into a 13-episode anime television series directed by Susumu Kudo in 2002 (based on volumes 1, 2, 6, 7, and 8) and an OVA directed by Fumie Muroi in 2004 (based on volume 9). Both were animated by Madhouse and produced by SME Visual Works (now Aniplex). The anime television series and the OVAs have since been released in North America by Media Blasters, and both have aired on Encore Action and Encore WAM.

=== Stage play ===
The Shouwa-Hen gaiden was adapted into a five-part stage play produced by Trifle Entertainment. The first part was held at Theater Sun Mall in Shinjuku on September 17 to 23, 2014. The second part was held at Theater 1010 in Kita-Senju on October 8 to 13, 2015. The third part was held at Theater Sun Mall in Shinjuku on October 21 to 30, 2016. The fourth part was held at Theater 1010 in Kita-Senju on October 12 to 17, 2017. The fifth and final part was held at Space Zero Renrouzumi Hall in Shinjuku on August 11 to 19, 2018. A DVD (and Blu-Ray as of part four) was released a few months after each part was completed.

== Anime Episode list ==
1. "Ill-Fated Destiny" (炎渦の邂逅, Enka no Kaikō) - Two high school friends discover they are the reincarnation of ancient warriors who soon realize they are locked in a deadly battle with the spirit of a long-dead evil warlord.
2. "Possessor From The Darkness" (闇からの換生, Yami kara no Kanshō) - Naoe talks with Takaya about his past, the battle 400 years ago, and the awakening of Takeda Shinken.
3. "An Imperfect Awakening" (無明の覚醒, Mumyō no Kakusei) - Yuzuru goes missing after the binding bracelet Naoe gives him is removed.
4. "Premonition of a Chain Reaction" (連鎖の予感, Rensa no Yokan) - Takaya meets a strange woman while riding his motorcycle to school. Afterwards he learns he has a new classmate and best friend he has no memory of. Later Uesugi meets Takaya at his school and senses an ominous presence.
5. "Endless Conflict" (終わりなき葛藤, Owarinaki Kattō) - Spirits from Japan's Dark Ages, known as Possessors, are reappearing in modern times. Takaya has now met two others with spirit powers, Naoe and Ayoho. They insist his body is being possessed by a powerful samurai.
6. "Golden Emblem" (緋色の刻印, Hiiro no Kokuin) - Takaya's doubt meets its final test as his entire school turns into a spawning ground for the armies of the Undead.
7. "Memories of Hateful Anguish" (怨嗟の記憶, Ensa no Kioku) - For the past 2 months, Takaya and Naoe have been exorcising spirits left and right. For another lovely history lesson, Naoe takes Takaya to a special place where a war rages on.
8. "At the End of Obsession" (迷執の果て, Meishū no Hate) - Takaya is forced to confront his anger and mixed emotions about himself and Naoe. He must come to grips with these emotions quickly before he injures himself or someone else maliciously.
9. "Endless Void" (果てしなき虚空, Hateshinaki Kioku) - Naoe searches for and confronts the evil beast Tsutsuga.
10. "Sorrowful Betrayal" (哀しい背信, Kanashī Haishin) - Unable to accept his alternate identity, Takaya meets with Ujiteru Hojo, Kagetora's brother, and he is forced to remember his past with Naoe.
11. "Eternal Blaze" (永遠の業火, Towa no Gouka) - The Hojo clan begins a cataclysmic plan to take over Nikko. They've kidnapped Yuzuru and plan to burn him alive to release a burst of spiritual energy.
12. "Choices of Conflict" (修羅の選択, Shura no Sentaku) - An unexpected answer is given to Lord Ujiasu's proposal.
13. "Twilight of Beyond" (遥かなる残照, Harukanaru Zanshō) - Naoe and Takaya search for the Tsutsuga mirrors to destroy them.

== OVA episode list ==
1. "Chapter 1 - Dearest Wish" (第一章 悲願, Higan)
2. "Chapter 2 - Tiger's Eye" (第二章 タイガース・アイ, Taigāsu Ai)
3. "Chapter 3 - Wind of the River's Edge" (第三章 みなぎわの風, Minagiwa no Kaze)

== Novel Volumes List ==
=== Original Series ===
1. "Mirage of Blaze" (炎の蜃気楼, Honō no Mirage)
2. "Traces of Scarlet" (緋の残影, Aka no Zanei) #2
3. "Glass Lullaby" (ガラスの子守歌, Garasu no Komoriuta) #3
4. "Amber Meteoric Swarm" (琥珀の流星群, Kohaku no Ryūseigun) #4
5. "Dragon God of Mahoroba" (まほろばの龍神, Mahoroba no Ryūjin) #5
6. "Fragment - For You, My Beloved" (断章-最愛のあなたへ, Danshō- Saiai no Anata e) #5.5
7. "The Supreme Ruler's Demonic Mirror (Part 1)" (覇者の魔鏡（前編）, Hasha no Makyō Zenpen) #6
8. "The Supreme Ruler's Demonic Mirror (Part 2)" (覇者の魔鏡（中編）, Hasha no Makyō Chūhen) #7
9. "The Supreme Ruler's Demonic Mirror (Part 3)" (覇者の魔鏡（後編）, Hasha no Makyō Kōhen) #8
10. "Rebels of the River Edge" (みなぎわの反逆者, Minagiwa no Hangyakusha) #9
11. "Youkihi the Sea Goddess (Part 1)" (わだつみの楊貴妃（前編）, Wadatsumi no Yōkihi Zenpen) #10
12. "Youkihi the Sea Goddess (Part 2)" (わだつみの楊貴妃（中編）, Wadatsumi no Yōkihi Chūhen) #11
13. "Youkihi the Sea Goddess (Part 3)" (わだつみの楊貴妃（後編）, Wadatsumi no Yōkihi Kōhen) #12
14. "The Windhole to the Underworld (Part 1)" (黄泉への風穴（前編）, Yomi e no Fūketsu) #13
15. "The Windhole to the Underworld (Part 2)" (黄泉への風穴（後編）, Yomi e no Fūketsu) #14
16. "Kingdom of the Fire Wheel (Part 1)" (火輪の王国（前編）, Karin no Ōkoku Zenpen) #15
17. "Kingdom of the Fire Wheel (Part 2)" (火輪の王国（中編）, Karin no Ōkoku Chūhen) #16
18. "Kingdom of the Fire Wheel (Part 3)" (火輪の王国（後編）, Karin no Ōkoku Kōhen) #17
19. "Kingdom of the Fire Wheel - the Violent Wind" (火輪の王国（烈風編）, Karin no Ōkoku Reppū-hen) #18
20. "Kingdom of the Fire Wheel - the Intense Wave" (火輪の王国（烈濤編）, Karin no Ōkoku Rettō-hen) #19
21. "Embrace the Cross to Sleep" (十字架を抱いて眠れ, Jūjika o Daite Nemure) #20
22. "Fragment - Abandoned Suffering" (砂漠殉教, Sabaku Junkyō) #20.5
23. "Rupture of the Star's Destiny" (裂命の星, Retsumyō no Hoshi) #21
24. "The Fascinating Pioneer" (魁の蠱, Sakigake no Mushi) #22
25. "Gate of Vengeance - the Blue Sea" (怨讐の門 （青海編）, Onshū no Mon Ōmi-hen) #23
26. "Gate of Vengeance - the Crimson Sky" (怨讐の門（赤空編）, Onshū no Mon Akasora-hen) #24
27. "Gate of Vengeance - the White Thunder" (怨讐の門（白雷編）, Onshū no Mon Hakurai-hen) #25
28. "Gate of Vengeance - the Black Sun" (怨讐の門（黒陽編）, Onshū no Mon Kokuyō-hen) #26
29. "Gate of Vengeance - the Yellow Earth" (怨讐の門（黄壤編）, Onshū no Mon Kōjō-hen) #27
30. "Gate of Vengeance - the Damaged Earth" (怨讐の門（破壤編）, Onshū no Mon Hajō-hen) #28
31. "The Eternal Pure Land" (無間浄土, Mukan Jōdo) #29
32. "The Twinkle Book of Revelations I - the Nachi chapter" (燿変黙示録I（那智の章）, Yōhen Mokushiroku I Nachi no Shō) #30
33. "The Twinkle Book of Revelations II - the Futsu chapter" (燿変黙示録II（布都の章）, Yōhen Mokushiroku II Futsu no Shō) #31
34. "The Twinkle Book of Revelations III - the Yata chapter" (燿変黙示録III（八咫の章）, Yōhen Mokushiroku III Yata no Shō) #32
35. "The Twinkle Book of Revelations IV - the Jinmu chapter" (燿変黙示録IV（神武の章）, Yōhen Mokushiroku IV Jinmu no Shō) #33
36. "The Twinkle Book of Revelations V - the Demon chapter" (燿変黙示録V（天魔の章）, Yōhen Mokushiroku V Tenma no Shō) #34
37. "The Twinkle Book of Revelations VI - the Fire Rebellion chapter" (燿変黙示録VI（乱火の章）, Yōhen Mokushiroku VI Ranka no Shō) #35
38. "The Twinkle Book of Revelations VII - the Murky Destruction chapter" (燿変黙示録VII（濁破の章）, Yōhen Mokushiroku VII Dakuha no Shō) #36
39. "Tolling the Bells of Revolution" (革命の鐘は鳴る, Kakumei no Kane wa Naru) #37
40. "The Forelocks of Asura" (阿修羅の前髪, Ashura no Maegami) #38
41. "Battlefield of the Thunder" (神鳴りの戦場, Kaminari no Ikusaba) #39
42. "Beyond 100 Billion Nights" (千億の夜をこえて, Senoku no Yoru o Koete) #40

Extras

1. "Exaudi nos" (アウディ・ノス)
2. "Ultramarine" (群青, Gunjō)
3. "Reverse the Crimson Flag" (真紅の旗をひるがえせ, Shinku no Hata o Hirugaese)
4. "Mirage of Blaze Memorial" (炎の蜃気楼メモリアル, Honō no Mirage Memorial)
5. "The Red Whales set to fly, the Vidro Kids" (赤い鯨とびいどろ童子, Akai Kujira to Bīdoro Dōji)

=== Kaikou-Hen Series ===
1. "Pure White Echo: The Birth of a Yaksha" (真皓き残響・夜叉誕生, Makouki Zankyou: Yasha Tanjou) #1
2. "Pure White Echo: Magical Sword Dance" (真皓き残響・妖刀乱舞, Makouki Zankyou: Youto Ranbu) #2
3. "Pure White Echo: Lord Gaidoumaru" (真皓き残響・外道丸様, Makouki Zankyou: Gaidoumaru-sama) #3
4. "Pure White Echo: Thirteen Gods" (真皓き残響・十三神将, Makouki Zankyou: Juusan Shinshou) #4
5. "Pure White Echo: Princess Biwajima" (真皓き残響・琵琶島姫, Makouki Zankyou: Biwajime-hime) #5
6. "Pure White Echo: Ice & Snow, Questions & Answers" (真皓き残響・氷雪問答, Makouki Zankyou: Hyousetsu Mondou) #6
7. "Pure White Echo: Strange Life, Weird Clothes" (真皓き残響・奇命羅変, Makouki Zankyou: Kiinochi Rahen) #7
8. "Pure White Echo: Sixteen-Night Mirror" (真皓き残響・十六夜鏡, Makouki Zankyou: Juuroku-ya Kagami) #8
9. "Pure White Echo: Revenge & Rebirth" (真皓き残響・仕返換生, Makouki Zankyou: Shikae Kansei) #9
10. "Pure White Echo: Spirited Away Area" (真皓き残響・神隠地帯, Makouki Zankyou: Kamikaku Chitai) #10
11. "Pure White Echo: Ranryou the Demon King" (真皓き残響・蘭陵魔王, Makouki Zankyou: Ranryou Maou) #11
12. "Pure White Echo: Circle of Transmigration" (真皓き残響・生死流転, Makouki Zankyou: Shoujiruten) #12

=== Bakumatsu-Hen Series ===
1. "Devouring a Guardian Lion" (獅子喰らう, Shishi Kurau) #1
2. "Burning a Guardian Lion" (獅子燃える, Shishi Moeru) #2

=== Shouwa-Hen Series ===
1. "Nightingale Blues" (夜啼鳥ブルース, Yanakidori Buruusu) #1
2. "Swallowtail Butterfly Blues" (揚羽蝶ブルース, Agehachou Buruusu) #2
3. "Lapis Lazuli Swallow Blues" (瑠璃燕ブルース, Ruri Tsubame Buruusu) #3
4. "Hoarfrost City Blues" (霧氷街ブルース, Muhyou Machi Buruusu) #4
5. "Dream Magic Lantern Blues" (夢幻燈ブルース, Yume Gentou Buruusu) #5
6. "Yaksha Squad Boogie-Woogie" (夜叉衆ブギウギ, Yasha Shuu Bugi Ugi) Side Story
7. "Hoodlum Star Blues" (無頼星ブルース, Burai Sei Buruusu) #6
8. "Bridge of Dear Wishes Blues" (悲願橋ブルース, Higan Hashi Buruusu) #7
9. "Bright Red Hill Blues" (紅蓮坂ブルース, Guren Saka Buruusu) #8
10. "Nirvana Moon Blues" (涅槃月ブルース, Nehan Tsuki Buruusu) #9
11. "Dying a Glorious Death Blues" (散華行ブルース, Sangekou Buruusu) #10

== Drama CD ==
1. "Dragon God of Mahoroba" (まほろばの龍神, Mahoroba no Ryūjin) , 1992
2. "For You, My Beloved" (最愛のあなたへ, Saiai no Anata e) , 1993
3. "NIGHT WINGS" (この夜に、翼を -NIGHT WINGS-, Kono Yoru ni, Tsubasa o) , 1994
4. "For Whom the Eagle Flies" (鷲よ、誰がために飛ぶ, Washi yo, Tagatame ni Tobu) , 1997

The main voice actors in the drama CD series and the anime series (Japanese ver) are same. Besides, "Cobalt Tokimeki Telephone(コバルトときめきテレフォン)" that short stories or drama CDs which Seki Toshihiko and Sho Hayami reading the novels are made for premiums by Cobalt's all the applicants service.

== Image Album and Anime OST ==
Mai Yamane (as Kathy Shower), Naoto Fuuga also sang image songs in the albums.

Image Album

1. - MIRAGE OF BLAZE - (炎の蜃気楼 ―MIRAGE OF BLAZE―, Honō no Mirage - MIRAGE OF BLAZE -) , 1993
2. Mirage of Blaze Off Vocal Version (炎の蜃気楼 OFF VOCAL VERSION, Honō no Mirage Off Vocal Version) (Karaoke ver of 1st Album), 1995
3. Mirage of Blaze II - Youkihi the Sea Goddess - (炎の蜃気楼II―わだつみの楊貴妃―, Honō no Mirage II - Wadatsumi no Yōkihi -) , 1995
4. Mirage of Blaze III - From Kingdom of the Fire Wheel - (炎の蜃気楼III～火輪の王国より～, Honō no Mirage III - Karin no Ōkoku Yori -) , 1996
5. Mirage of Blaze IV - Obsessive love - (Vocal Collection) (炎の蜃気楼IV―執愛―（ヴォーカル・コレクション）, Honō no Mirage IV - Shūai -) , 1998
6. Mirage of Blaze Off Vocal Collection (炎の蜃気楼 OFF VOCAL COLLECTION, Honō no Mirage Off Vocal Collection) (Karaoke ver of All Image Album songs), 1998
7. Mirage of Blaze SPECIAL CD COLLECTION (炎の蜃気楼 SPECIAL CD COLLECTION, Honō no Mirage SPECIAL CD COLLECTION) (Complete Album Collection of all Image Albums), 2002

Anime OST

1. Mirage of Blaze Original Soundtrack (炎の蜃気楼 オリジナルサウンド・トラック, Honō no Mirage Original Sound Track), 2002
2. Mirage of Blaze- Rebels of the River Edge Original Soundtrack (みなぎわの反逆者 オリジナルサウンド・トラック, Honō no Mirage- Minagiwa no Hangyakusha Original Sound Track), 2004
