= Tomonobu =

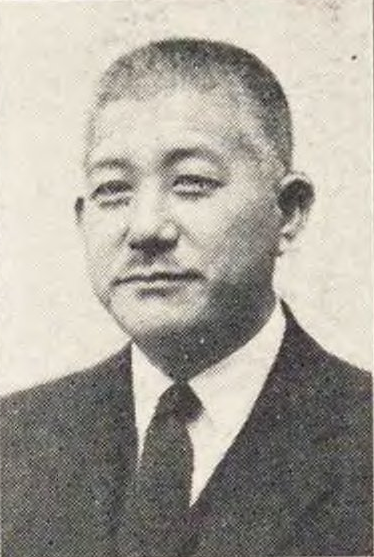
- Tomonobu Iizuka (1892–1965), Japanese politician
- Pronunciation: tomonobɯ (IPA)
- Gender: Male

Origin
- Origin: Japanese
- Meaning: Different meanings depending on the kanji used

Tomonobu is a masculine Japanese given name.

== Written forms ==
Tomonobu can be written using many different combinations of kanji characters. Some examples:

- 友信, "friend, believe"
- 友伸, "friend, extend"
- 友延, "friend, extend"
- 友宣, "friend, announce"
- 知信, "know, believe"
- 知伸, "know, extend"
- 知延, "know, extend"
- 知宣, "know, announce"
- 智信, "intellect, believe"
- 智伸, "intellect, extend"
- 智延, "intellect, extend"
- 智宣, "intellect, announce"
- 共信, "together, believe"
- 共伸, "together, extend"
- 朋信, "companion, believe"
- 朋伸, "companion, extend"
- 朝信, "morning/dynasty, believe"
- 朝伸, "morning/dynasty, extend"
- 朝延, "morning/dynasty, extend"
- 朝宣, "morning/dynasty, announce"

The name can also be written in hiragana とものぶ or katakana トモノブ.

== Notable people with the name ==
- Tomonobu Hayakawa (早川 知伸; born 1977), Japanese footballer
- Tomonobu Hiroi (廣井 友信; born 1985), Japanese footballer
- Tomonobu Iizuka (飯塚 知信; 1892–1965), Japanese politician
- Tomonobu Imamichi (今道 友信; 1922–2012), Japanese philosopher
- Tomonobu Itagaki (板垣 伴信; 1967–2025), Japanese video game designer
- Tomonobu Saito (斎藤 朝信; 1527–1591), Japanese samurai
- Tomonobu Shimizu (清水 智信; born 1981), Japanese boxer
- Tomonobu Yokoyama (横山 知伸; born 1985), Japanese footballer
