= Naganori =

- Gender: Male

Origin
- Origin: Japanese
- Meaning: Different meanings depending on the kanji used

Naganori (written: 長矩, 長敦 or 修令) is a masculine Japanese given name. Notable people with the name include:

- Asano Naganori (浅野 長矩; 1667–1701), Japanese daimyō
- Naganori Ito (伊藤 修令; born 1937), Japanese automotive engineer
- Shibata Naganori (新発田 長敦; 1538–1580), Japanese samurai
