= Seien-in =

Seienin (清円院) was a Japanese noble woman from the Nagao clan during the tumultuous Sengoku period. She is perhaps best known as the formal second wife of Uesugi Kagetora, also referred to as Kakeiin, and as the niece of the famed Uesugi Kenshin. She was the daughter of Aya-Gozen and sister of Uesugi Kagekatsu.

== Biography ==
Seienin was born in 1556 as the eldest daughter of Nagao Masakage and his formal wife, Sentōin. Her family included two brothers, Yoshikage and Akikatsu (later known as Uesugi Kagekatsu), and a younger sister named Hana.

=== Marriage to Uesugi Kagetora ===
In 1570, a significant alliance was forged between her uncle, Uesugi Kenshin of Echigo Province, and Hōjō Ujimasa of Sagami Province, led by Ujimasa's seventh son, Saburō. Saburō was adopted by Kenshin and took the name Uesugi Kagetora. Seienin was subsequently married to Kagetora, and in the following year, she gave birth to their eldest son, Uesugi Dōmanmaru.

=== The Otate Conflict ===
The year 1578 brought about a challenging period for Seienin and her family with the passing of Kenshin. This event triggered a succession struggle within the Uesugi family, pitting Kagetora against Seienin's own brother, Uesugi Kagekatsu, in what is famously known as the Otate Conflict.

During this tumultuous time, Seienin fled Kasugayama Castle, which was under the control of Uesugi Kagetora, and sought refuge in the Otate, a residence located below Kasugayama Castle. This residence, initially built for the Kantō-kanrei (deputy shōgun of the Kantō), had also been used by Kenshin for political matters.

Tragically, due to an attack by forces loyal to Kagekatsu, the residence was eventually overrun. Kagetora, aiming to end his own life, managed to escape from the residence. However, Seienin, despite warnings from Kagekatsu to surrender, chose to take her own life within the residence.

Historical records suggest that her date of death occurred on 24 March. There is a strong possibility that she died alongside Kagetora at Samegao Castle, located near Kasugayama and controlled by the Uesugi, along the only route leading to the Kantō region.

=== Legacy ===
Today, at the Meigetsu Temple in Kamakura, there stands a Buddhist mortuary tablet bearing the name of Seienin, serving as a lasting testament to her presence and the tumultuous times in which she lived.
