= Naoe Kagetsuna =

Officer under the Uesugi clan in historic Japan

Naoe Kagetsuna (直江 景綱; 1509–1577) was an officer under the Uesugi clan in historic Japan.

Kagetsuna served as a very close confidant to Uesugi Kenshin. In both domestic and external affairs, Kagetsuna left his mark on Kenshin's regime. Kagetsuna was entrusted with distribution and defense of the supplies and reinforcements to the battlefield, during the expedition to the Kantō region. He fought alongside the Uesugi clan during the Battle of Kawanakajima.

His widow daughter, Lady Osen (お船の方) was married to Naoe Kanetsugu.
