= Maebashi Castle =

Castle in Gunma prefecture, Japan

Coordinates: 36°23′32.54″N 139°3′41.69″E

Maebashi Castle 前橋城
- Maebashi, Gunma Prefecture, Japan
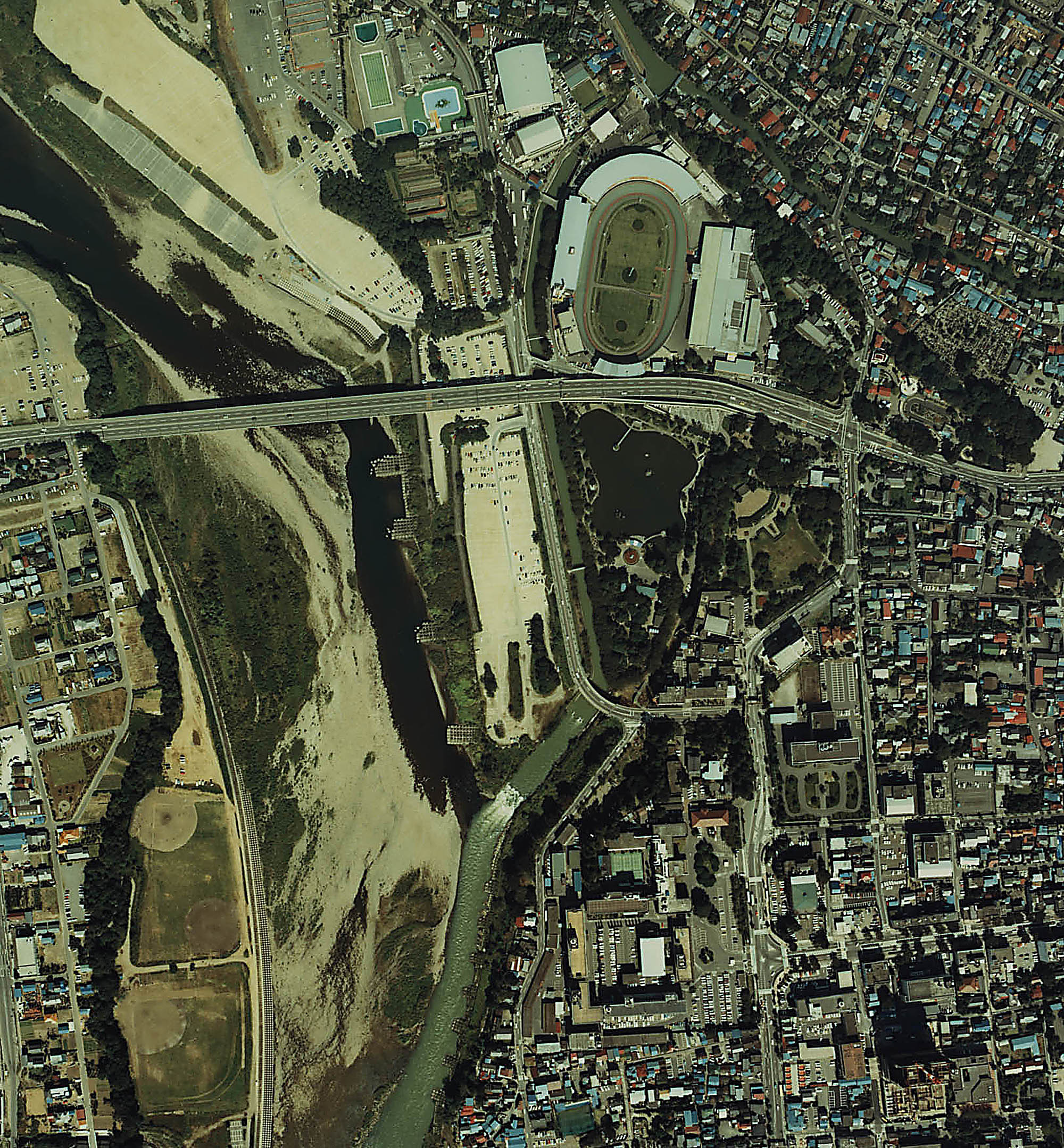
- site of Maebashi Castle

Site information
- Type: flatland-style Japanese castle
- Open to the public: yes

Location

Site history
- Built: 15th century rebuilt 1863
- Built by: Nagano Akinari, Kitajō Takahiro, Matsudaira Naokatsu
- In use: Edo period
- Demolished: 1872

Maebashi Castle (前橋城, Maebashi-jō) is a castle located in Maebashi, central Gunma Prefecture, Japan. At the end of the Edo period, Maebashi Castle was home to a branch of the Matsudaira clan, daimyō of Maebashi domain, although the castle was ruled by a large number of different clans over its history. The castle was also known as "Mayabashi-jō" (厩橋城), after the former name of Maebashi.

== Location ==
Maebashi Castle is built on a steep bank of the Tone River in the center of former Kōzuke Province. The location was a strategic junction on the main highway from Edo to Echigo Province and the Sea of Japan and the Nakasendō highway connecting Edo with Kyoto.

== History ==
=== Sengoku period ===
A fortification called Ishikura Castle (石倉城, Ishikura-jō) was built on banks of the Tone River near the site of the present castle in 1470 by the Nagano clan, retainers of the Uesugi clan who controlled the Kantō region with the position of Kantō Kanrei. However, the castle was damaged on several occasions by flooding of the Tone River.

The Uesugi were defeated by the Odawara Hōjō at the Battle of Kawagoe in 1546, around which time the Nagano clan defected to the Hōjō side. However, the Hojo were driven out by Uesugi Kenshin in 1560, who expanded Ishikura castle into one of his seven main strongholds in the Kantō area. The combined forces of the Hōjō and Takeda clans recaptured the caste in 1562, but were unable to hold it. Kenshin gave the castle to Kitajō Takahiro, but in 1567 Kitajō defected to the Hōjō clan, and later to the Takeda clan in 1579.

When the Takeda clan was extinguished by Oda Nobunaga in 1582, the castle was awarded to Takigawa Kazumasu, who resided here for only three months until Nobunaga's assassination. The Hōjō took the opportunity to recover the castle, but were themselves extinguished by Toyotomi Hideyoshi in 1590.

=== Edo period ===
After Tokugawa Ieyasu took control over the Kantō region in 1590, he assigned Hiraiwa Chikayoshi, one of his most trusted generals, as castellan. However, in 1601, Sakai Shigetada was installed as daimyō of Maebashi, initially with a kokudaka of 33,000 koku. The Sakai clan ruled over the next seven generations, completely rebuilding Maebashi Castle on higher ground with multiple baileys and a three-story tenshu. During the Sakai tenure, the revenues of the domain increased to 150,000 koku, prior to their transfer in 1749 to Himeji Domain.

Maebashi was then given to a branch of the Matsudaira clan from Echizen Province, and Matsudaira Tomonori ruled from 1749 to 1767. However, erosion from the Tone River and flooding continued to plague the castle, and in 1767 Matsudaira Tomonori decided to relocate his seat from Maebashi to Kawagoe Castle, demoting Maebashi Domain to a detached territory of Kawagoe Domain.

Towards the Bakumatsu period, the growing prosperity and economic importance of Maebashi due to the silk trade led to the local townspeople petitioning their lord for his return to Maebashi Castle. The Tokugawa shogunate also looked to the Maebashi area as a possible site a refuge should Edo be attacked by the western powers, and supported the move. A new Maebashi Castle was completed in 1866, and the Matsudaira clan relocated back to Maebashi in 1867. The tenshu of the new castle was located slightly further inland than before, and the outer walls were reconstructed with zigzag lines to avoid dead angles. This was the last Japanese castle to be constructed in the Edo period.

== Modern period ==
The Meiji Restoration commenced less than half a year after the new castle was completed. Most of its defensive structures were demolished by 1871, but the main palace was retained for use as the Gunma Prefectural Office until 1928. At present, the 33-story Gunma Prefectural Government Building is located on the site of the former tenshu. Maebashi City Hall occupies the former Second Bailey, and the Maebashi District Court occupies the Third Bailey, with much of the remaining area as a park. Only a small portion of the clay wall in the central and third baileys remain in situ, and one of the original gates survives, albeit not in its original location.

== Literature ==
- Schmorleitz, Morton S. (1974). Castles in Japan. Tokyo: Charles E. Tuttle Co. pp. 144–145. ISBN 0-8048-1102-4.
- Motoo, Hinago (1986). Japanese Castles. Tokyo: Kodansha. p. 200 pages. ISBN 0-87011-766-1.
- Mitchelhill, Jennifer (2004). Castles of the Samurai: Power and Beauty. Tokyo: Kodansha. p. 112 pages. ISBN 4-7700-2954-3.
- Turnbull, Stephen (2003). Japanese Castles 1540-1640. Osprey Publishing. p. 64 pages. ISBN 1-84176-429-9.
