= Kitajō Takahiro =

Japanese samurai

- 北条 高広
- Born: Unknown
- Died: Unknown
- Military career
- Commands: Kitajō Castle, Maebashi Castle

Kitajō Takahiro (北条 高広; 1517? – 1587?), also known as Mōri Takahiro, was a Japanese samurai and commander of the Sengoku period.

In 1563, he was appointed castle lord of Maebashi Castle, which was a strategically important castle for the Uesugi clan. Thereafter, he helped the Uesugi clan's military affairs in Kantō Province. At the Siege of Otate, he supported Uesugi Kagetora with his son Kitajō Hirotaka. Hirotaka was seriously injured and died in a fierce battle at Odate Castle. Kitajō castle was attacked and captured by Uesugi Kagekatsu. Later, Takahiro became a vassal of Takigawa Kazumasu.
