= Aya-Gozen =

Japanese monk (1524–1609)

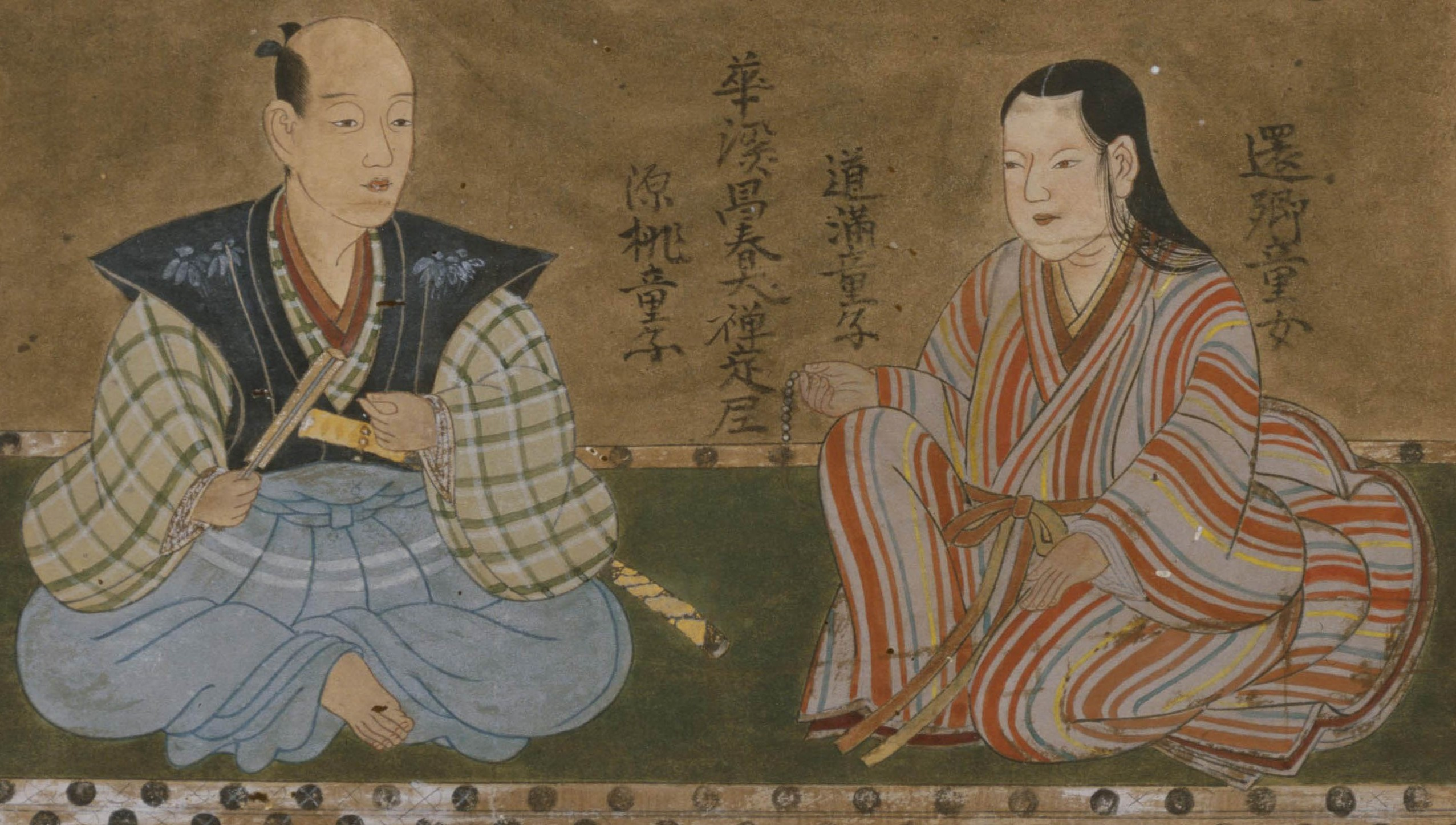
- Aya-Gozen with her husband Nagao Masakage
- Born: 1524
- Died: March 10, 1609 (aged 84–85)
- Known for: Half-sister of Japanese warlord Uesugi Kenshin
- Spouse: Nagao Masakage
- Children: 4, including Uesugi Kagekatsu
- Father: Nagao Tamekage
- Relatives: Uesugi Kenshin (brother); Uesugi Kagetora (son-in-law)
- Family: Nagao clan Uesugi clan

Lady Aya (綾御前, Aya-Gozen; 1524 – March 10, 1609) was a Japanese noblewoman from the Sengoku period. She was the half-sister of Japanese warlord Uesugi Kenshin. She was also the mother of Uesugi Kagekatsu and the first wife of Nagao Masakage. Aya is best known for her role in events before and after the siege of Otate; she lamented the Uesugi civil war for succession after Kenshin's death and refused to support either heir.

== Life ==
Aya was the second daughter of Nagao Tamekage. Her mother is believed to have later born Uesugi Kenshin. The term -gozen is an honorific suffix; her given name was Aya (綾). She had two sons and two daughters by Nagao Masakage: their oldest son in childhood, so their second son, Kagekatsu, was adopted into the Uesugi clan, as reportedly were their daughters. Aya-Gozen moved to Kasugayama Castle in 1564. According to legend, she was a highly intelligent woman and skilled in recognizing talent, being responsible for employing various samurai to work for Kenshin. She recommended Naoe Kanetsugu to serve her son, Kagekatsu. It was rumored that Kanetsugu tried his best to care for her in gratitude.

After Kenshin's death, a dispute arose between Kagekatsu and Kagetora; Aya-Gozen tried to protect Kagetora's heir after the death of her eldest daughter Seienin (Kagetora's wife). Although she was with Kagetora, she returned to Kikuhime (Takeda Shigen's daughter and Uesugi Kagekatsu's wife) and Osen no Kata's (Naoe Kanetsugu's wife) care. After the conflict, she returned to Kasugayama Castle. Later, Sentōin received protection from Kagekatsu and accompanied him during transfers to Aizu in 1598 and to Yonezawa in 1601.

In 1609, she died at Yonezawa Castle, and was enshrined at Risen-ji. Owing to her efforts toward its construction, she is called a founder of the temple. The actual characters to write her name are confirmed from the death register kept at the temple. Her Buddhist name was Sentō-In (仙洞院). As for why she was named as such, the reasons are still debated even to this day.
