= Saitō Tomonobu =

Saitō Tomonobu (斎藤 朝信; 1527–1591) was an officer under the Uesugi clan following the Sengoku period of Japan in the 16th century. He was a commander of the Akada Castle. He was nicknamed the Zhong Kui of Echigo.

He had a remarkable skill in diplomacy and at the same time, he was skilled in administration skills and Uesugi Kenshin placed him in a highly trusted position. Tomonobu fought in several campaigns for the Uesugi throughout his career. He also thwarted many attacks from the Oda clan. He is often considered to be one of the most capable generals for the Uesugi and he was highly regarded for his administrative capabilities as well as a being a terrific warrior.

Served under Uesugi Kagekatsu, after the death of his previous lord, Kenshin. On the occasion of the Siege of Otate, he supported Uesugi Kagekatsu and helped Kagekatsu become successor of the Uesugi clan.
