= Samegao Castle =

Sengoku period yamashiro-style Japanese castle

- 鮫ヶ尾城
- Myōkō, Niigata Prefecture, Japan
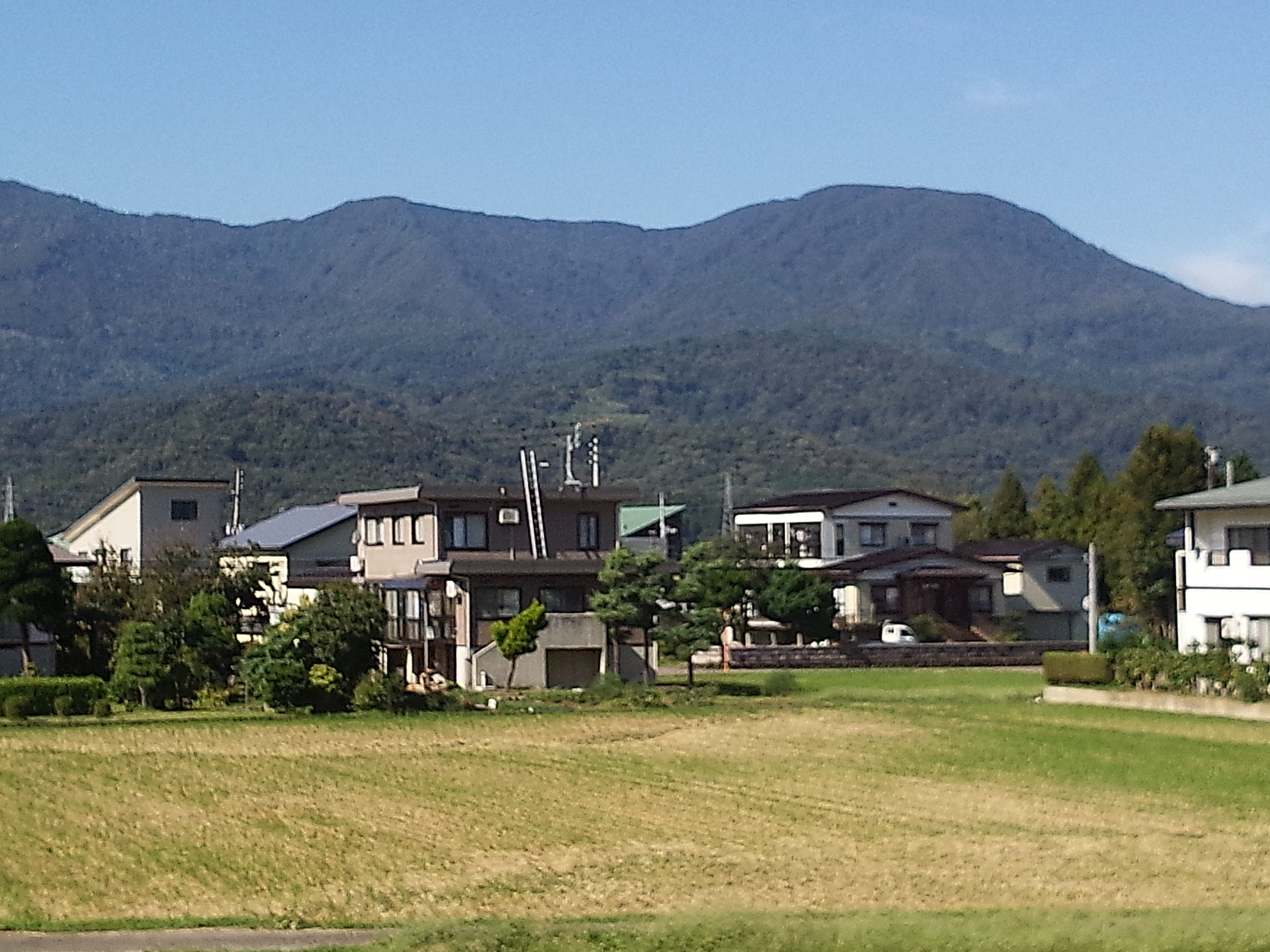
- Samegao Castle ruins

Site information
- Type: yamashiro-style Japanese castle
- Open to the public: yes (hiking trails)
- Condition: ruins

Location
- Coordinates: 37°3′4″N 138°13′48″E

Site history
- Built: c.1570s
- Built by: Uesugi Kenshin
- In use: Sengoku period
- Demolished: unknown

Samegao Castle (鮫ヶ尾城, Samegao-jō) was a Sengoku period yamashiro-style Japanese castle located in what is now the Yukimori and Miyauchi neighborhoods of the city of Myōkō, Niigata Prefecture in the Hokuriku region of Honshu, Japan. The ruins have been protected as a National Historic Site since 2008.

== Background ==
Samegao Castle is located on Shiroyama hill, a 180-meter hill at the western edge of the Takada Plain, which creates a bottleneck in the southern portion of the province on the route to Shinano Province. The lower portion of Shiroyama contains the Hida Sites, the ruins of a Yayoi period fortified settlement, which indicates that the location was seen as a strategically important place for over 1800 years.

After the Fourth Battle of Kawanakajima in 1560, Takeda Shingen seized most of Shinano Province. Shingen's arch-rival, Uesugi Kenshin had his capital at Kasugayama Castle in what is now the city of Jōetsu, only 50 kilometers from the border with Shinano. With few natural obstacles standing between Kasugayama Castle and the border, the Uesugi clan quickly fortified the border area and its remaining holdings in Shinano (i.e. Iiyama Castle) against a sudden invasion by Takeda forces.

== Structure ==
Samegao Castle was one of the relatively large castles in the area, extending over 300 meters across the hilltop, and consisting of three main areas. The inner bailey consisted of several terraces approximately 50 meters long, protected on its north edge by steep dry moats. The entrance was to the east, which was a kuruwa with clay and earthen ramparts, dry moats and terraces intermittently extending along a long ridge. South of the inner bailey was the third area, with smaller terraces built up the steep hill in steps, and formed the rear of the castle.

== History ==
Although built primarily to guard against the Takeda clan, Samegao Castle was more deeply connected with the inner struggle of the Uesugi clan following the death of Uesugi Kenshin. Kenshin had two adopted sons, Uesugi Kagekatsu and Uesugi Kagetora, but died without appointing a successor. The clan quickly fell into civil war, with Kagekatsu seizing Kasugayama Castle and making a peace treaty with the Takeda clan. On the other hand, Kagetora was strongly backed by the Hōjō clan. In April 1578, Kagekatsu made an all-out attack on Kagetora's headquarters at Otate. Kagetora was defeated, and escaped to Samegao Castle, where he committed suicide. The castle appears to have been abandoned shortly after this time. After Oda Nobunaga destroyed the Takeda clan in 1582 and occupied Shinano Province, his forces threatened the Uesugi clan in Echigo, but there is no evidence that Samegao Castle had been rebuilt by that time.

During modern archaeological excavations, traces of burnt buildings and carbonized rice were excavated. These materials are evidence of the battle of this time.

The castle was listed as one of the Continued Top 100 Japanese Castles in 2017, a list intended as a sequel of Top 100 Japanese Castles.

The ruins are located about 10 minutes by car from Kita-Arai Station on the JR East Shin'etsu Main Line.

== See also ==
- List of Historic Sites of Japan (Niigata)
