= Maebashi Domain =

Japanese historical estate in Kozuke province

Maebashi Domain 前橋藩
- under Tokugawa shogunate Japan
- 1601–1871
- Capital: Maebashi Castle
  - Type: Daimyō
- Historical era: Edo period
  - Established: 1601
  - Disestablished: 1871
- Today part of: part of Gunma Prefecture

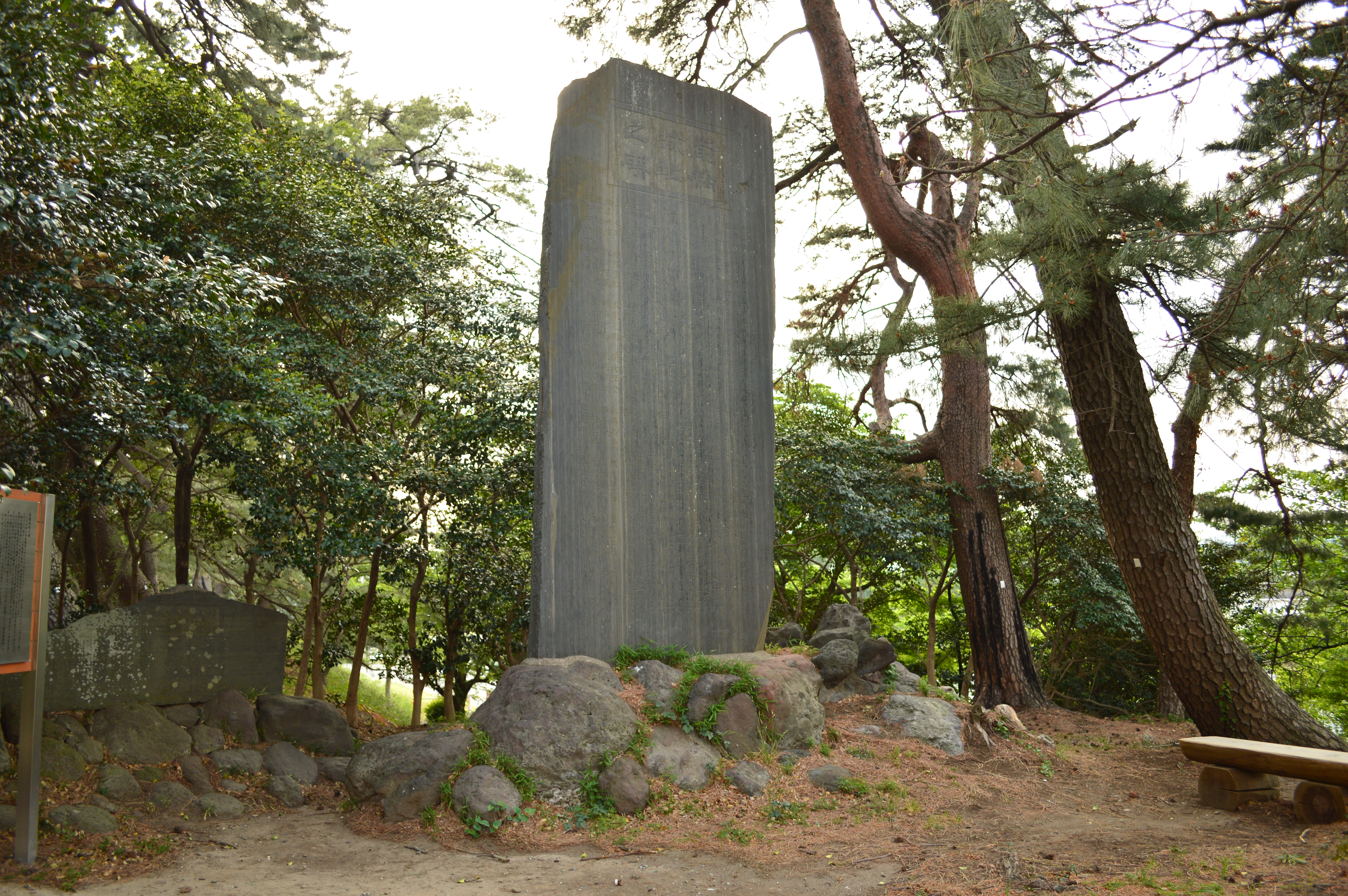
Monument making location of Maebashi Castle, headquarters of Maebashi Domain

Maebashi Domain (前橋藩, Maebashi-han) was a feudal domain under the Tokugawa shogunate of Edo period Japan, located in Kōzuke Province (modern-day Gunma Prefecture), Japan. It was centered on Maebashi Castle in what is now part of the city of Maebashi, Gunma.

== History ==
Maebashi was the location of an important fortification in the Sengoku period on a strategic junction of the Tone River with the main highway from Edo to Echigo Province and the Sea of Japan with the Nakasendō highway connecting Edo with Kyoto. The area was hotly contested between the Uesugi clan and the Takeda and Odawara Hōjō clans.

After Tokugawa Ieyasu took control over the Kantō region in 1590, he assigned the area to his trusted general, Hiraiwa Chikayoshi, with revenues of 33,000 koku. Following the establishment of the Tokugawa shogunate, the Hiraiwa were transferred to Kōfu Castle and were replaced by a branch of the Sakai clan, formerly daimyō of Kawagoe Domain. The Sakai ruled over nine generations from 1601 to 1749, during which time the domain was gradually enlarged to 150,000 koku. The 2nd daimyō, Sakai Tadayo and 4th daimyō, Sakai Tadakiyo served as tairō within the shogunal administration.

After the Sakai were transferred to Himeji Domain, they were replaced the a branch of the Matsudaira clan from Echizen Province, and Matsudaira Tomonori ruled from 1749 to 1767. However, erosion from the Tone River and repeated flooding continued to plague the castle, and in 1767 Matsudaira Tomonori decided to relocate his seat from Maebashi to Kawagoe Castle, demoting Maebashi Domain to a detached territory of Kawagoe Domain.

Towards the Bakumatsu period, the growing prosperity and economic importance of Maebashi due to the silk trade led to the local townspeople petitioning their lord for his return to Maebashi Castle. The Tokugawa shogunate also looked to Maebashi as a possible refuge should Edo be attacked by the western powers, and supported the move. A new Maebashi castle was completed in 1866, and the Matsudaira clan relocated back to Maebashi in 1867. During the Boshin War, Maebashi Domain was quick to side with the imperial cause. However, the domain’s detached exclave in Futtsu sided with the Tokugawa and one of the rōjū of the parent domain in Maebashi was forced to commit seppuku in atonement.

After the end of the conflict, with the abolition of the han system in July 1871, Maebashi Domain became “Maebashi Prefecture”, which later became part of Gunma Prefecture.

== Holdings at the end of the Edo period ==
As with most domains in the han system, Maebashi Domain consisted of several discontinuous territories calculated to provide the assigned kokudaka, based on periodic cadastral surveys and projected agricultural yields,

- Kōzuke Province
  - 60 villages in Gunma District
  - 102 villages in Seta District
  - 2 villages in Sai District
  - 15 villages in Nawa District
  - 21 villages in Nitta
  - 1 village in Yamada District
  - 10 villages in Ōra District
- Shimotsuke Province
  - 4 villages in Aso District
  - 3 villages in Ashikaga District
- Hitachi Province
  - 25 villages in Kōchi District
  - 7 villages in Tsukuba District
- Musashi Province
  - 13 villages in Tama District
  - 13 villages in Saitama District
  - 65 villages in Hiki District
  - 20 villages in Koma District
  - 11 villages in Iruma District
  - 2 villages in Hanzawa District
  - 4 villages in Kodama District
  - 7 villages in Chichibu District
  - 3 villages in Naka District
  - 11 villages in Ōsato District
- Awa Province
  - 31 villages in Asai District
  - 19 villages in Hei District
  - 18 villages in Awa District
- Kazusa Province
  - 17 villages in Amaha District
  - 20 villages in Sue District
  - 74 villages in Mōda District
- Omi Province
  - 10 villages in Kurita District
  - 2 villages in Yasu District
  - 1 village in Gamo District

== List of daimyō ==
#	Name	Tenure	Courtesy title	Court Rank	kokudaka
Sakai clan (Fudai) 1601–1749
1	Sakai Shigetada (酒井重忠)	1601–1617	Kawachi-no-kami (河内守)	Lower 5th (従五 位下)	33,000 koku
2	Sakai Tadayo (酒井忠世)	1617–1636	Uta-no-kami (雅楽頭); Jijū (侍従)	Lower 4th (従四 位下)	33,000 -->52,000-->122,000 koku
3	Sakai Tadayuki (酒井忠行)	1636–1636	Awa-no kami (阿波守)	Lower 4th (従四 位下)	122,000-->152,000 koku
4	Sakai Tadakiyo (酒井忠清)	1636–1681	Uta-no-kami (雅楽頭); Sakone-no-shōshō (左近衛少将)	Lower 4th (従四 位下)	152,000-->150,000 koku
5	Sakai Tadataka (酒井忠挙)	1681–1707	Uta-no-kami (雅楽頭)	Lower 4th (従四 位下)	150,000 koku
6	Sakai Tadami (酒井忠相)	1707–1708	Uta-no-kami (雅楽頭)	Lower 4th (従四 位下)	150,000 koku
7	Sakai Chikayoshi (酒井親愛)	1708–1720	Uta-no-kami (雅楽頭)	Lower 4th (従四 位下)	150,000 koku
8	Sakai Chikamoto (酒井親本)	1720–1731	Uta-no-kami (雅楽頭); Jijū(侍従)	Lower 4th (従四 位下)	150,000 koku
9	Sakai Tadazumi (酒井忠恭)	1731–1749	Uta-no-kami(雅楽頭); Sakone-no-shōshō (左近衛少将)	Lower 4th (従四 位下)	150,000 koku
Matsudaira clan (fudai) 1749–1767; 1867–1871
1	Masudaira Tomonori (松平朝矩)	1749–1767	Yamato-no-kami (大和守)	Lower 4th (従四位下)	150,000 koku
Seat transferred to Kawagoe Domain in Musashi Province 1767–1867
1	Matsudaira Naokatsu (松平直克)	1867–1869	Yamato-no-kami (大和守); Sakone-no-shōshō (左近衛少将)	Lower 4th (従四位下)	170,000 koku
2	Matsudaira Naokata (松平直方)	1869–1871	-none-	-none-	170,000 koku

=== Genealogy (Matsudaira-Echizen) ===
- Tokugawa Ieyasu, 1st Tokugawa Shōgun (1543–1616)
  - Yūki Hideyasu, 1st Lord of Fukui (1574–1607)
    - Matsudaira Naomoto, Lord of Himeji (1604–1648)
      - Naonori, Lord of Shirakawa (1642–1695)
        - Chikakiyo, 1st Lord of Shirakawa (1682–1721)
          - Akinori, 2nd Lord of Shirakawa (1713–1749)
            - I. Tomonori, 1st Lord of Maebashi (1st cr., 1749) (1738–1768; r. 1749–1767)
              - Naotsune, 2nd Lord of Kawagoe (1762–1810)
                - Naritsune, 4th Lord of Kawagoe (1797–1850)
                  - Tsunenori, 5th Lord of Kawagoe (1836–1883)
                    - Motonori, 13th Echizen family head, 1st Count (1875–1930; 13th family head: 1884–1907; Count: cr. 1884)
                - Yoihiro (1808–1855)
                  - Megumi-hime (1850–1885), m. I. Matsudaira (Arima) Naokatsu, 1st Lord of Maebashi (2nd cr., 1867) (1840–1897; r. 1867–1869)
                    - Naoyuki, 14th Echizen family head, 2nd Count (1861–1932; 14th family head and 2nd Count: 1907–1932)
                      - Naohisa, 15th Echizen family head, 3rd Count (1885–1965; 15th family head: 1932–1965; 3rd Count: 1932–1947)
                        - Naomasa, 16th Echizen family head (b. 1919; 16th family head: 1965-)
                          - Naoyasu (b. 1944)
                            - Naotaka (b. 1972)
  - Tokugawa Hidetada, 2nd Tokugawa Shōgun (1579–1632)
    - Tamahime (1599–1622), m. Maeda Toshitsune, 3rd Lord of Kaga (1594–1658)
      - Maeda Toshitsugu, 1st Lord of Toyama (1617–1674)
        - Maeda Masatoshi, 2nd Lord of Toyama (1649–1706)
          - Maeda Toshitaka, 4th Lord of Toyama (1690–1745)
            - Maeda Toshitomo, 6th Lord of Toyama (1737–1794)
              - Maeda Toshinori, 8th Lord of Toyama (1768–1801)
                - Maeda Toshiyasu, 10th Lord of Toyama (1800–1859)
                  - Maeda Toshikata, 12th Lord of Toyama (1835–1904)
                    - II. Matsudaira (Maeda) Naokata, 2nd Lord of Maebashi (2nd cr) (1858–1907; Lord: 1869; Governor: 1869–1871; 12th Echizen family head: 1869–1884)
