= Uesugi =

Uesugi (jap. 上杉, sometimes written Uyesugi) is a Japanese surname. Notable people with the surname include:

== People ==
- Uesugi clan, a Japanese samurai clan
  - Uesugi Akisada, (1454–1510), a samurai of the Uesugi clan
  - Uesugi Harunori (1751–1822), a Japanese daimyō
  - Uesugi Kagekatsu (1556–1623), a daimyō during the Sengoku and Edo periods of Japanese history
  - Uesugi Kagenobu (?–1578), a samurai and relative of Uesugi Kenshin in the Sengoku period of Japan
  - Uesugi Kagetora (1552–1579), the seventh son of Hōjō Ujiyasu and adopted son of Uesugi Kenshin
  - Uesugi Kenshin (1530–1578), a daimyō who ruled Echigo province in the Sengoku period of Japan
  - Uesugi Mochinori (1844–1919), a Japanese samurai of the late Edo period
  - Uesugi Narinori, (1820–1889), a Japanese daimyō of the Edo period
  - Uesugi Norimasa (1523–1579), a daimyō of feudal Japan
  - Uesugi Norizane, (1410–1466), a Japanese samurai of the Uesugi clan
  - Uesugi Tomooki, (1488–1537), a lord of Edo Castle and enemy of the Hōjō clan during the Sengoku period of Japan
  - Uesugi Tsunakatsu, (1639–1664), a Japanese daimyō of the Edo period
  - Uesugi Zenshū (unknown-1417), the chief advisor to Ashikaga Mochiuji, an enemy of the Ashikaga shogunate in feudal Japan
- Takashi Uesugi (born 1968), a Japanese freelance journalist
- Takeo Uesugi (born 1940), a Japanese-American landscape architect known for his garden designs

=== Fictional characters ===
- Kazuya Uesugi and Tatsuya Uesugi from the anime and manga series Touch
- Tatsuha Uesugi, from the anime and manga series, Gravitation
- Futaro Uesugi, the male protagonist of the anime and manga series The Quintessential Quintuplets
