= Uesugi Kagenobu =

Uesugi Kagenobu (上杉 景信; ? – July 15, 1578) was an Uesugi general, samurai, and related to Uesugi Kenshin; both of them come from the Nagao clan. He lived during the Sengoku era of Japan.

Kagenobu was a very respected retainer under Kenshin. He fought in the Uesugi campaigns in the Kanto region as well as at the Battles of Kawanakajima. He made supporting Uesugi Kagetora during the Siege of Otate.
