= Shibata Nagaatsu =

Japanese military commander

Shibata Nagaatsu (新発田 長敦; 1538 – 1580), was a Japanese military commander who served under the warlord Uesugi Kenshin, as one of the Twenty-Eight Generals of Uesugi.

The son of Shibata Tsunasada and the elder brother of Shibata Shigeie (Shibata Harunaga), Nagaatsu served under Kenshin from the latter's earliest campaigns. Nagaatsu began serving Kenshin at a very young age and fought in many of his battles.

He fought on the right flank at the 4th Battle of Kawanakajima (1561) and Battle of Tedorigawa (1577).

In 1578, during the Siege of Otate, the succession struggle that followed Kenshin's death, Nagaatsu supported Kenshin's son Kagekatsu. Nagaatsu died of illness in 1580.
