= Siege of Otate =

Coordinates: 37.1673°N 138.2356°E

- Part of the Sengoku period
Date	April 23, 1578
Location	Otate castle, Samegao Castle, Echigo province, Japan
Result	Siege successful; Uesugi Kagekatsu victorious

Belligerents
forces of Uesugi Kagetora	forces of Uesugi Kagekatsu

Commanders and leaders
Uesugi Kagetora; Uesugi Kagenobu; Uesugi Norimasa; Kitajō Takahiro	Uesugi Kagekatsu; Naoe Kanetsugu; Honjō Shigenaga; Saitō Tomonobu

The 1578 siege of Otate (御館の乱, Otate no ran) took place following the sudden death of Uesugi Kenshin. Kenshin had requested that the inheritance be split between his nephew, Uesugi Kagekatsu, and his adopted son Uesugi Kagetora. This conflict happened because of neither heirs being born with the Uesugi name. Kagekatsu was the biological son of Nagao Masakage and Kagetora was biological son of Hojo Ujiyasu.

Before the situation could escalate into an armed conflict, Takeda Katsuyori acted as the mediator between those two. Therefore, eventually the Uesugi was divided for a military conflict. The Takeda supported Kagekatsu and the Hojo supported Kagetora.

Thus, on April 23, 1578— the 17th day of the 3rd month of Tensho 6 on the Japanese lunar calendar— Uesugi Kagekatsu led a force from his castle at Kasugayama to besiege Otate castle . Kagetora tried to return to Odawara but committed seppuku in Samegao Castle, and Kagekatsu claimed the full inheritance.

== Uesugi retainers who supported Kagekatsu ==
- Honjo Shigenaga
- Naoe Kanetsugu
- Jojo Masashige
- Saito Tomonobu
- Yasuda Akimoto
- Yoshie Munenobu
- Ogita Nagashige
- Irobe Nagazane
- Shibata Naganori
- Shibata Shigeie
- Suibara Chikanori
- Takenomata Yoshitsuna

== Uesugi retainers who supported Kagetora ==
- Uesugi Norimasa
- Aya Gozen
- Seien-in
- Uesugi Kagenobu
- Saiponji Kagenaga
- Saiponji Sadanaga
- Kanamari Chikatsuna
- Kawada Nagachika
- Kaji Hidetsuna
- Momoi Yoshitaka
- Kitajō Takahiro
- Kitajō Hirotaka
- Ayukawa Morinaga

== See also ==
- Aya-Gozen
- Naoe Kanetsugu
