= Nagao Masakage =

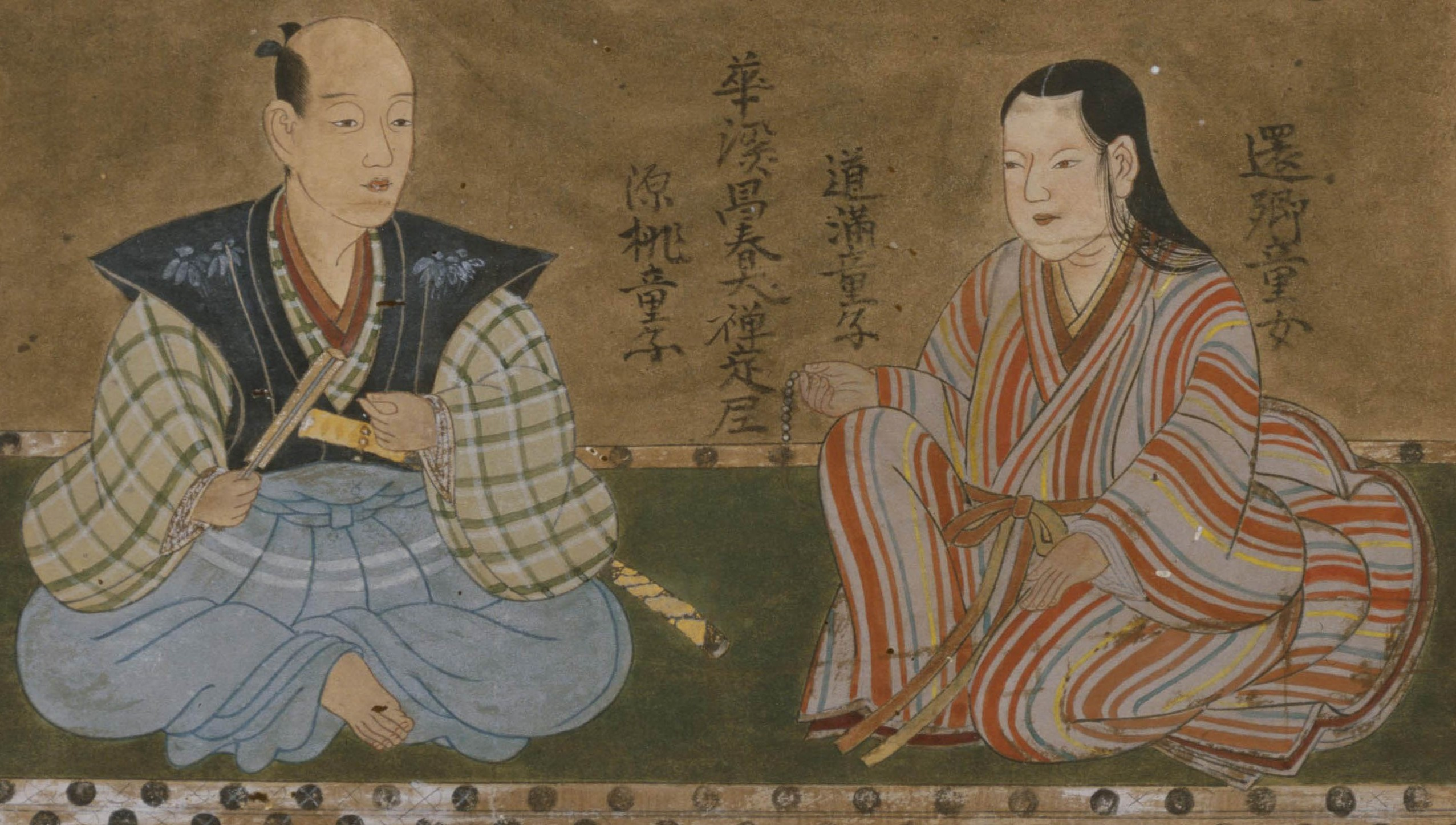
Nagao Masakage and his wife Aya-Gozen.

Nagao Masakage (長尾 政景; 1526 – August 11, 1564) was the head of the Ueda Nagao clan following the Sengoku period of the 16th century of Japan. He was the husband of Aya-Gozen and the birth father of Uesugi Kagekatsu, Kenshin's successor.
