= Uesugi Kagetora =

Samurai of the Sengoku period; son of Hōjō Ujiyasu, adopted by Uesugi Kenshin

- 上杉 景虎
- Born: 1552 or 1554
- Died: April 19, 1579; Samegao Castle
- Other names: Hōjō Saburō, Hōjō Ujihide, Saburō Kagetora
- Known for: Adoption by Uesugi Kenshin, Succession struggle with Uesugi Kagekatsu
- Spouse: Seien-in
- Parent: Hōjō Ujiyasu (father)
- Relatives: Hōjō Ujimasa (uncle), Hōjō Genan (adoptive father)

Uesugi Kagetora (上杉 景虎; 1552 or 1554 – April 19, 1579) was the seventh son of Hōjō Ujiyasu; known as Hōjō Saburō, he was adopted by Uesugi Kenshin, and was meant to be Kenshin's heir. However, in 1578, he was attacked in his castle at Otate by Uesugi Kagekatsu—Kagetora's respective brother-in-law—and was subsequently defeated. Kagetora committed suicide the following year in Samegao Castle.

== Biography ==
Uesugi Kagetora was born in either 1552 or 1554, and during his lifetime was also known as Hōjō Ujihide (北条氏秀), Hōjō Saburō (北条三郎), Saburō Kagetora (三郎景虎). He was the seventh son (sixth to survive to adulthood) of Hōjō Ujiyasu, younger brother of Hōjō Ujimasa, Hōjō Ujiteru, Hōjō Ujikuni, Hōjō Ujinori, Hōjō Ujitada, and older brother of Hōjō Ujimitsu. His mother was the sister-in-law of Toyama Yasumitsu, a vassal of the Hōjō clan (other sources say Suikeiin, Ujiyasu's principle wife). It's likely that he and Hōjō Ujihide were two different people and that Ujihide was the son of Hōjō Tsunashige and living in Edo while Saburō was living in Echigo, so most historians refer to him as Hōjō Saburō when describing his early life.

As a child, he was sent into the priesthood at Sōun-ji in Hakone, then sent as hostage to Takeda Shingen of the Takeda clan in the three-way alliance between Hōjō, Takeda, and Imagawa formed in 1554. He was adopted by his uncle Hōjō Genan in 1569 and married his daughter.

When the Hōjō and Uesugi clans formed an alliance in 1569, Saburō was sent to Uesugi Kenshin in an exchange of hostages with Kakizaki Haruie. At first, the hostage was set to be Hōjō Ujimasa's third son Kunimasumaru, but Ujimasa could not bring himself to send off his son, who was then still a baby. Saburō was sent to the Uesugi clan in early 1570. Kenshin, who never married, developed a liking for the handsome and intelligent Saburō. He married his niece Seienin, the daughter of Nagao Masakage and older sister of Nagao Akikage (Uesugi Kagekatsu) to Saburō, gave him the name Kagetora (a name that had once belonged to Kenshin himself), and adopted him into the Uesugi clan.

When Kenshin died suddenly in 1578 without naming an heir, Kagetora and Kagekatsu, similarly adopted by Kenshin, fought for succession to the position of clan head. This episode became known as the Otate no Ran. Though Kagetora held the early advantage with the backing of Uesugi vassals such as Uesugi Kagenobu, Hōjō Hidetsuna, Kitajō Takahiro, and the Hōjō clan, the tide of the battle turned with Takeda Katsuyori's betrayal to Kagekatsu's side.

When Otate Castle fell in 1579, Kagetora attempted to escape to Odawara Castle (the Hōjō clan stronghold, Kagetora's birth land) but was betrayed at Samegao Castle by Horie Munechika and committed suicide. Seien-in (Kagetora's wife) committed suicide along with him, though there are also accounts that she remained behind at the Otate and committed suicide there when her brother Kagekatsu refused Kagetora's surrender. Kagetora's oldest son, Doumanmaru died at the hands of Kagekatsu's troops along with Uesugi Norimasa, and the rest of Kagetora's children were believed to have died along with their parents during the Otate power struggle.

There are accounts that Kagetora was better to replace Kenshin as heir, as Kagetora once aided Kenshin in a battle using his intelligence and earned him Kenshin's name, while Kagekatsu was only popular at gaining support in the Uesugi clan.

== Cultural references ==
A modern-day reincarnation of Kagetora appears in the light novel and anime series, Mirage of Blaze. He is one of the two primary characters—members of the Uesugi Netherworld Force—responsible for exorcising undead soldiers from the Japanese Feudal Era, which are taking part in a modern-day war, led by reincarnations of various feudal era warlords, including the spirit of Takeda Shingen.

== See also ==
- Uesugi clan
