= Uesugi Kagekatsu =

Japanese samurai daimyō during the Sengoku and Edo periods (1556–1623)

- 上杉 景勝
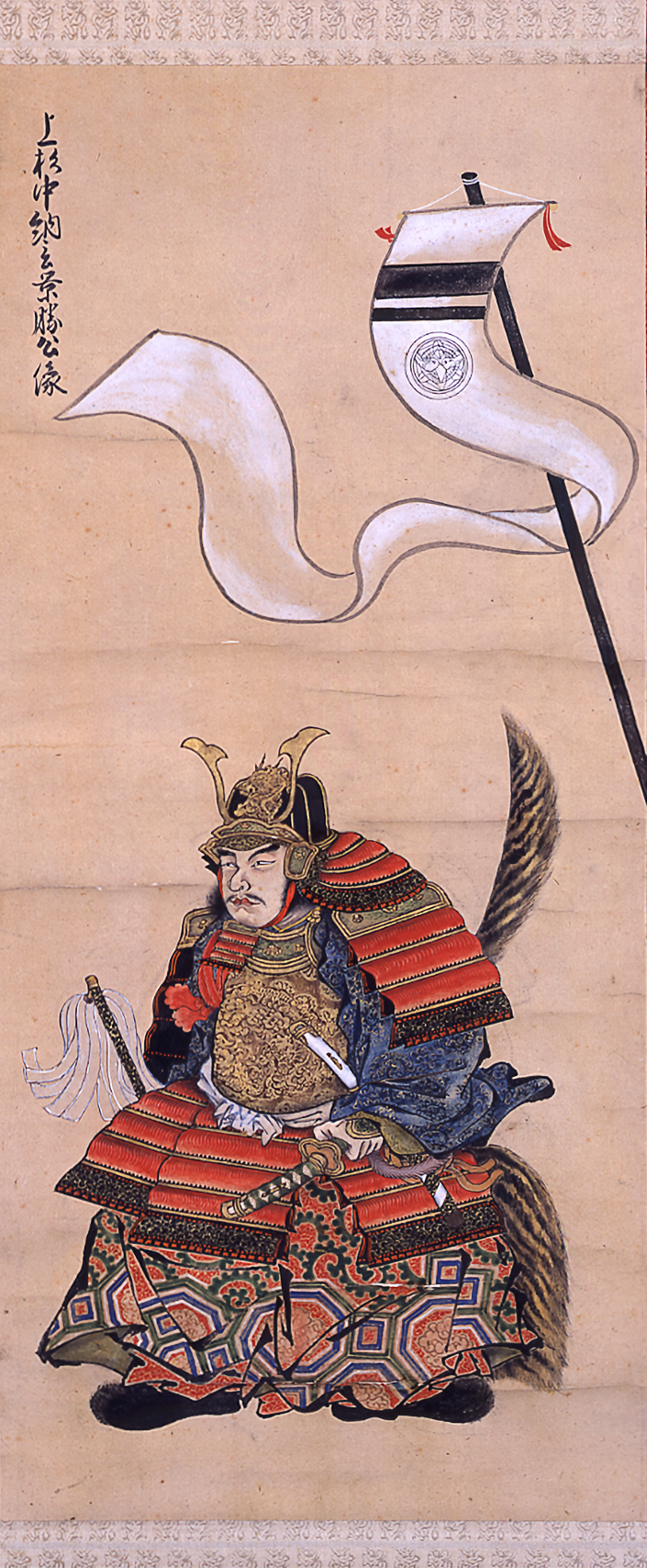

Head of Uesugi clan
- In office 1580–1623
- Preceded by: Uesugi Kenshin
- Succeeded by: Uesugi Sadakatsu

Lord of Yonezawa
- In office 1601–1623
- Succeeded by: Uesugi Sadakatsu

Lord of Aizu
- In office 1598–1601
- Preceded by: Gamō Hideyuki
- Succeeded by: Gamō Hideyuki

Personal details
- Born: Unomatsu; January 8, 1556 Echigo Province, Japan
- Died: April 19, 1623 (aged 67) Yonezawa, Japan
- Spouse: Kikuhime
- Children: Uesugi Sadakatsu
- Parents: Nagao Masakage (father); Aya-Gozen (mother)
- Relatives: Uesugi Kenshin (adoptive father); Uesugi Kagetora (brother-in-law)

Military service
- Allegiance: Uesugi clan Toyotomi clan Western Army; Tokugawa shogunate
- Unit: Uesugi clan
- Battles/wars: Battle of Tedorigawa; Siege of Otate; Battle of Tenjinyama; Siege of Uozu; Siege of Hachiōji; Siege of Hachigata; Siege of Odawara; Kunohe Rebellion; Sekigahara campaign Siege of Osaka

Uesugi Kagekatsu (上杉 景勝; 8 January 1556 – 19 April 1623) was a Japanese samurai daimyō during the Sengoku and Edo periods. He was the adopted son of Uesugi Kenshin and Uesugi Kagetora’s brother in law.

== Early life and rise ==
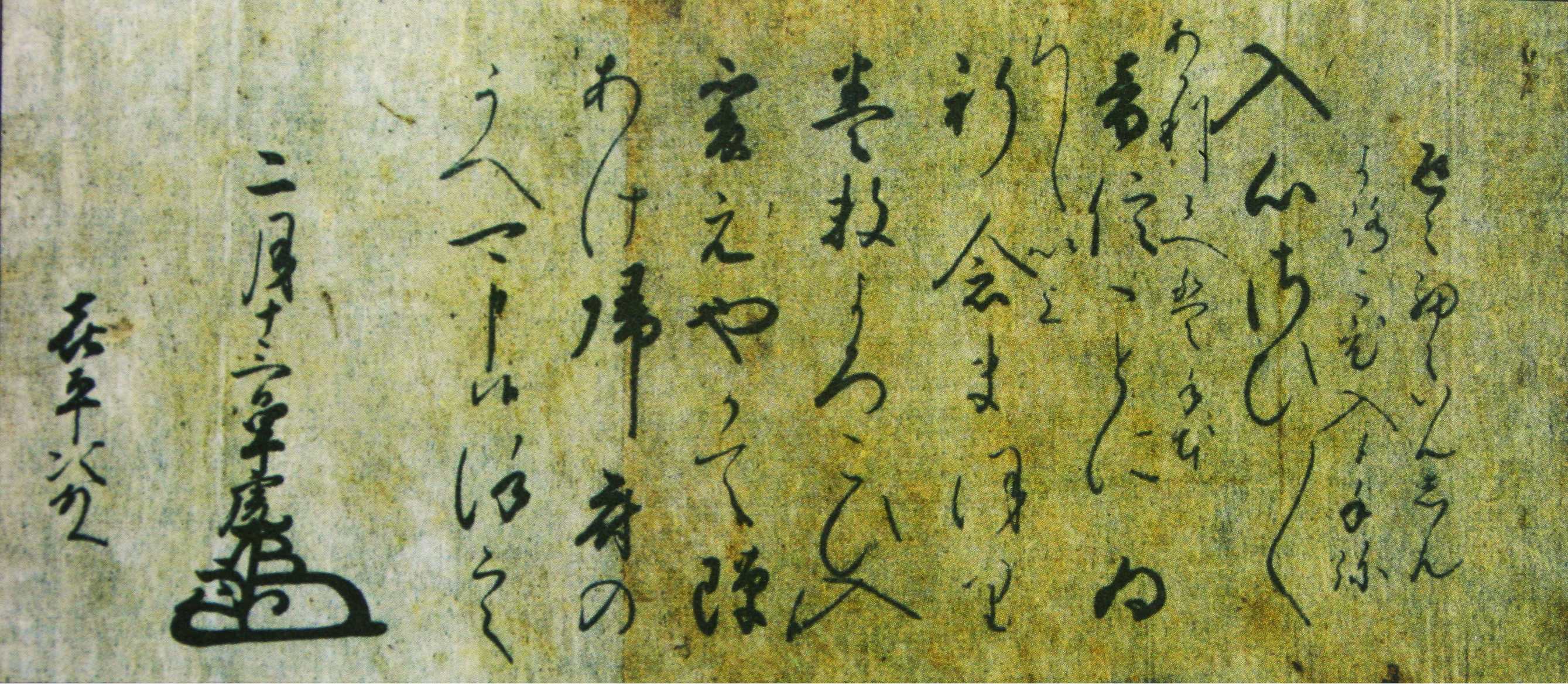
Letter from Uesugi Kenshin to Uesugi Kagekatsu.

Kagekatsu was the son of Nagao Masakage, the head of the Ueda Nagao clan and husband of Uesugi Kenshin's elder sister, Aya-Gozen. After his father died, he was adopted by Kenshin. His childhood name was Unomatsu.

In 1577, he participated in Battle of Tedorigawa. Upon Kenshin's death in 1578, Kagekatsu battled Kenshin's other adopted son Uesugi Kagetora for the inheritance, defeating Kagetora in the 1578 Siege of Otate.

In 1579, he forced Kagetora to commit suicide, and became head of the Uesugi clan. Kagekatsu married Takeda Katsuyori's sister (Takeda Shingen's daughter) after the Siege of Otate.

== Conflict with Oda ==
By 1579, Kagekatsu had gained the upper hand and forced Kagetora to commit suicide. This bloody division allowed Oda Nobunaga's generals (headed by Shibata Katsuie) to conquer the Uesugi's lands in Kaga, Noto, and Etchu.

In 1582, Kagekatsu led an army into Etchu and was defeated by Oda forces at the Battle of Tenjinyama. He hastily returned to Echigo when he learned that Oda general Mori Nagayoshi had raided Echigo in his absence.

When Oda forces under Shibata Katsuie and Sassa Narimasa laid siege to Uozu castle in Etchu, in the course of which a number of important Uesugi retainers were killed, Kagekatsu's fortunes appeared bleak. Kagekatsu sent a letter to Satake Yoshishige, his allies. It was like a suicide note.

Please don't worry about us.
I was born in a good era. We will fight against over 60 provinces of Japan with only this Echigo province.
If we survive, I'll become an unmatched hero. Even if we are destroyed, my name will go down in history.

Uozu castle fell on June 3, 1582, and Oda Nobunaga would die eighteen days later, in Kyoto. The Uesugi were given a reprieve with the death of Nobunaga shortly afterwards.

== Service under Hideyoshi ==
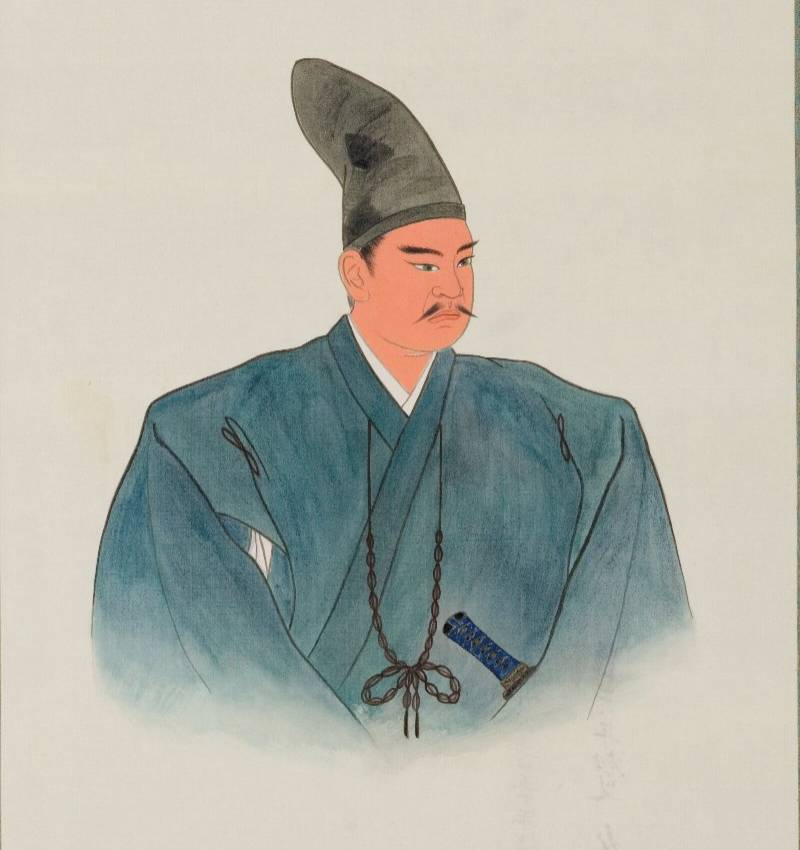
Uesugi Kagekatsu

Kagekatsu made friendly overtures to Toyotomi Hideyoshi, and attacked Shibata Katsuie's northern outposts during the Shizugatake Campaign (1583) and went on to support Hideyoshi during the Komaki Campaign (1584), in which he played a limited role by launching a foray into Shinano.

As a general under Toyotomi Hideyoshi, Kagekatsu took part in the Odawara campaign 1590 under Maeda Toshiie, and rise to prominence to become a member of the Council of Five Elders. Originally holding a 550,000 koku fief in Echigo Province, Kagekatsu received the fief of Aizu, worth a huge 1.2 million koku when Hideyoshi redistributed holdings in 1598. After Hideyoshi's death, that year, Kagekatsu then allied himself with Ishida Mitsunari, against Tokugawa Ieyasu, as the result of some political dispute.

== Sekigahara Campaign ==
The Sekigahara Campaign 1600 can be said to have begun, at least in part, with Kagekatsu, who was the first daimyō to openly defy the Tokugawa clan. He built a new castle in Aizu, attracting the attention of Ieyasu, who demanded that he explain his conduct at the capital. Kagekatsu refused, and Tokugawa began plans to lead a 50,000 man army north against him. Ishida and Uesugi hoped to occupy Tokugawa Ieyasu with this fighting in the north, distracting him from Ishida Mitsunari's attacks in the west. Anticipating this, Ieyasu remained to engage Mitsunari; his generals Mogami Yoshiaki and Date Masamune would fight Kagekatsu in Tōhoku (northern region Honshū, Japan's main island). Kagekatsu had intended to move his force south, attacking the Tokugawa from the north-east while Ishida attacked from the west, but he was defeated very early in the campaign, at his castle in the Siege of Shiroishi and later in the end of campaign at Siege of Hasedo.

== Service under Tokugawa ==
Declaring his allegiance to Tokugawa following his defeat in the Sekigahara campaign, Kagekatsu became a tozama (outsider) daimyō; he was given the Yonezawa han, worth 300,000 koku, in the Tōhoku region. Kagekatsu fought for the Tokugawa shogunate against the Toyotomi clan in the Osaka Campaign 1614–1615.

== Death ==
On March 20, 1623, Kagekatsu died in Yonezawa. He was 67–69 years old. He was succeeded by Uesugi Sadakatsu, his illegitimate son.

Kagekatsu's remains were laid at Shojoshin-in Temple at Mount Kōya, Koya city, while his ashes and court dress and kabuto were kept at the mausoleum of the Uesugi family located in Yonezawa, Yamagata Prefecture.

== Yamatorige sword ==
Yamatorige (山鳥毛; "feather of a copper pheasant"), equally known as Sanchōmō by its Sino-Japanese reading, is a tachi (Japanese greatsword) forged during the middle Kamakura period (13th century). The set of the blade and its koshirae (mountings) is a National Treasure of Japan. It was wielded by Uesugi Kagekatsu, and had been inherited by his clan.

== See also ==
- Yamatorige - sword wielded by Kagekatsu
- Uesugi clan
- Uesugi Kenshin
- Naoe Kanetsugu

Preceded by Uesugi Kenshin	Uesugi family head 1580–1623	Succeeded by Uesugi Sadakatsu
