= Takanashi =

Takanashi (often written: 高梨) is a Japanese surname. Notable people with the surname include:

- Kenta Takanashi (高梨 健太; born 1997), Japanese volleyball player
- Takanashi Kiara (小鳥遊キアラ), Austrian VTuber and singer affiliated with Hololive Productions
- Masahiro Takanashi (高梨 将弘; born 1983), Japanese professional wrestler
- Takanashi Masamori (高梨 政盛; died 1513), Japanese samurai
- Takanashi Masayori (高梨 政頼; died 1581), Japanese samurai
- Mitsuba Takanashi (高梨 みつば; born 1975), Japanese manga artist
- Rin Takanashi (高梨 臨; born 1988), Japanese actress and gravure idol
- Sara Takanashi (高梨 沙羅; born 1996), Japanese ski jumper
- Shizue Takanashi (たかなし しずえ), Japanese manga artist
- Takanashi Sumiyori (高梨 澄頼; died 1576), Japanese samurai
- Yasuharu Takanashi (高梨 康治; born 1964), Japanese anime composer
- Yutaka Takanashi (高梨 豊; born 1935), Japanese photographer

== Fictional characters ==
- Rikka Takanashi, a character in the light novel and anime series Love, Chunibyo & Other Delusions
- Hoshino Takanashi, a character in the role-playing video game Blue Archive

== See also ==
- Takanashi clan, Japanese clan
