= Tochio Castle =

Castle ruins in Nagaoka, Japan

- 栃尾城
- Nagaoka, Niigata, Japan
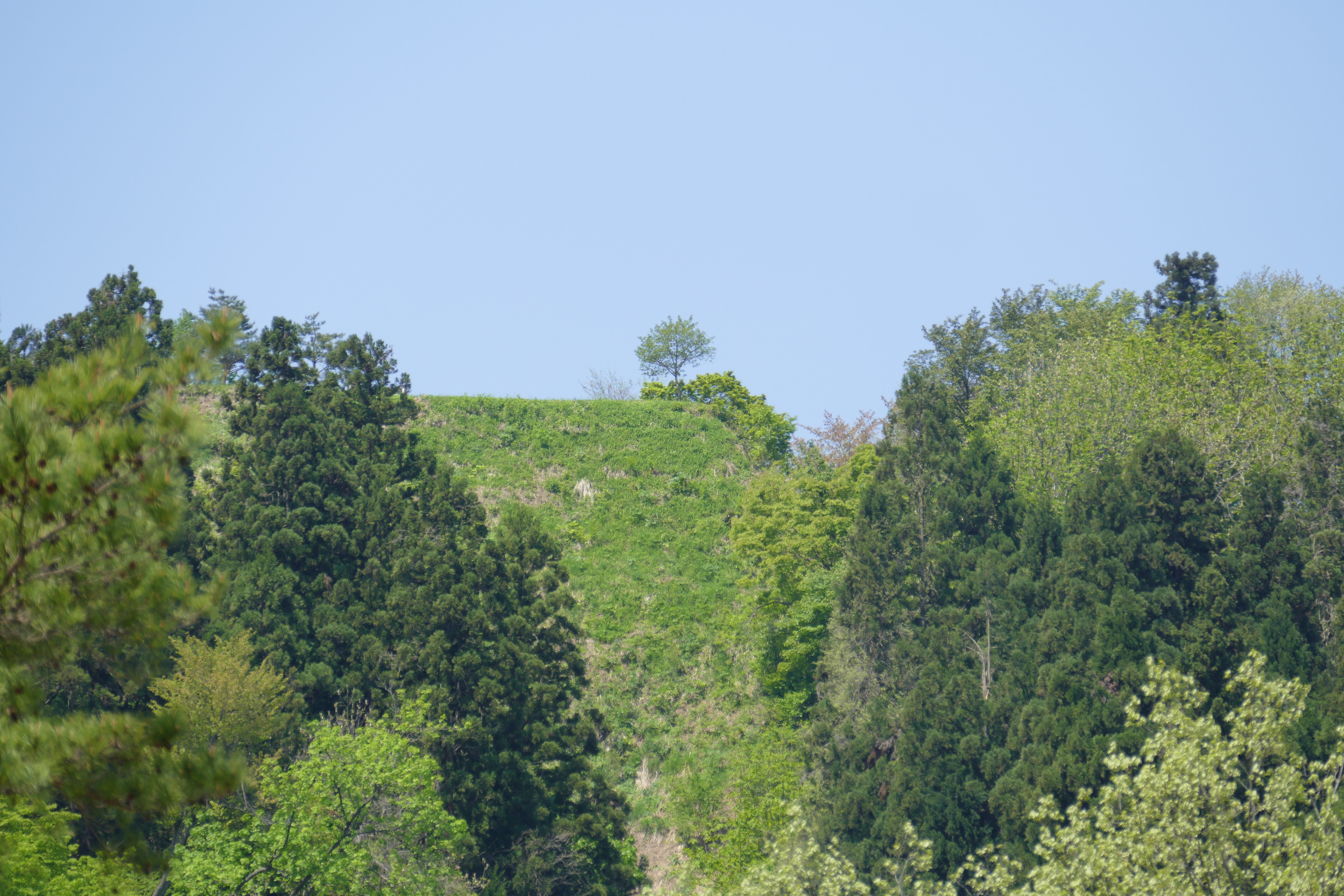
- Tochio Castle

Site information
- Type: Mountaintop castle
- Owner: Uesugi clan
- Condition: ruins

Site history
- Built: 15C
- Built by: ?
- Demolished: 1610
- Events: Siege of Tochio; Siege of Otate

Garrison information
- Past commanders: Uesugi Kenshin, Honjō Saneyori, Honjō Hidetsuna

Tochio Castle (栃尾城, Iino-jō) was a castle structure in Nagaoka, Niigata, Japan. The site is located on a 227-meter mountain. Young Uesugi Kenshin spent five years in the castle.

== History ==
The exact date of the castle's foundation is unknown but built in the Muromachi period. In 1543, Uesugi Kenshin left Kasugayama Castle and entered the castle as a joint commander by Nagao Harukage`s order.

In 1544, Kenshin made his first battle against local lords opposed to the Nagao clan in the castle and broke the siege.

In 1548, Kenshin returned to Kasugayama Castle as a feudal lord of the Nagao clan. The castle is now only ruins, with some earthenwalls, well and moats. Its ruins have been protected as a Prefectural Historic Site.

== See also ==
- List of Historic Sites of Japan (Niigata)
