= Honjō Saneyori =

Japanese samurai

- 本庄 実乃
- Born: 1511?
- Died: 1575?
- Military career
- Commands: Tochio Castle
- Conflicts: Battles of Kawanakajima

Honjō Saneyori (本庄 実乃; 1511? – 1575?) was a Japanese samurai and commander of the Sengoku period who served Uesugi Kenshin as a chief retainer.

He supported young Kenshin when he was a commander of Tochio Castle. Later when Kenshin became the head of the Nagao clan, Honjo moved to Kasugayama Castle as an important retainer of Kenshin.
