= Battle of Sendanno =

| Date | December 1536 |
| Location | Sendanno, Etchū Province, Japan |
| Result | Ikkō-ikki victory |

Belligerents
| Ikkō-ikki forces | Nagao clan forces |

Commanders and leaders
| Unknown | Nagao Tamekage |

The battle of Sendanno was a battle during the Sengoku period (16th century) of Japan, one of many fought by daimyōs (feudal lords) who sought to suppress the anti-samurai uprisings of the Ikkō-ikki. The Ikki were mobs of peasants, commoners, monks, and low-ranking samurai who revolted out of a desire to improve their social standing by threatening to overthrow the daimyo.

In December 1536, Nagao Tamekage set out from the castle of Kasugayama to fight against the Ikkō-ikki of Kaga Province. They met in battle at a place called Sendanno, in Etchū Province. There, Tamekage was defeated and killed, along with many other Nagao clan warriors. Tamekage's son, known as Nagao Harukage, was not present at the battle.
