= Tonegawa =

Tonegawa may refer to:

== History ==
- Battle of Tonegawa, a Japanese battle

== Science ==
- Susumu Tonegawa (1939–2026), Japanese scientist
- 6927 Tonegawa (1994 TE1), a minor planet discovered on October 2, 1994 Kitami Observatory, Japan

== Other ==
- Tone River (利根川 Tone-gawa), a river in the Kantō region of Japan
- Yukio Tonegawa, a character in the Japanese manga series, Kaiji
