= Akisada =

Akisada (written: 秋定) is a Japanese surname. Notable people with the surname include:

- Rio Akisada (秋定 里穂, born 1982), Japanese actress

Akisada (written: 顕定) is also a masculine Japanese given name. Notable people with the name include:

- Uesugi Akisada (上杉 顕定, 1454–1510), Japanese samurai
