= Shibata clan (Echigo province) =

Japanese clan (12th-16th century)

Shibata clan 新発田氏
- Home province: Echigo
- Parent house: Sasaki clan
- Final ruler: Shibata Shigeie
- Founding year: 12th century
- Dissolution: Late 16th century
- Ruled until: 1587, death of Shibata Shigeie

The Shibata clan (新発田氏, Shibata shi) was a Japanese clan that originated during the Heian period (12th century) of Japan. The Shibata clan of Echigo were descended from Sasaki Moritsuna, a supporter of Minamoto no Yoritomo and a son of Sasaki Hideyoshi. The Shibata later became retainers of the Nagao clan, which was under control by the famed Uesugi Kenshin. After Shibata Shigeie died during the year of 1587, the Shibata clan attempted to break away from the Uesugi. After this, the clan of Echigo became extinct, never to be seen again.

== Notable members ==
- Shibata Nagaatsu (1538–1580), Japanese military commander
- Shibata Shigeie (1547–1587), Japanese military commander
