= Yamayoshi Toyomori =

Hatamoto

Yamayoshi Toyomori (山吉 豊守) (1541–1577) was a hatamoto serving Uesugi Kenshin.

Toyomori negotiated a peace treaty with the Hōjō clan in 1570, just a year after Toyomori became a hatomoto. While Kenshin was out fighting elsewhere, he entrusted the defense of Kasugayama Castle to Toyomori. Toyomori died of illness in 1577.
