= Nagahide =

- Gender: Male

Origin
- Origin: Japanese
- Meaning: Different meanings depending on the kanji used

Nagahide (written: 長秀 or 永英) is a masculine Japanese given name. Notable people with the name include:

- Arase Nagahide (荒勢 永英; 1949–2008), Japanese sumo wrestler
- Niwa Nagahide (丹羽 長秀; 1535–1585), Japanese samurai
- Urakusai Nagahide (有楽斎 長秀), Japanese ukiyo-e artist
- Yasuda Nagahide (安田 長秀; 1517–1582), Japanese samurai
