= Masamori =

- Gender: Male

Origin
- Origin: Japanese
- Meaning: Different meanings depending on the kanji used

Masamori (written: 正盛, 正納, 政盛, 昌盛 or 昌守) is a masculine Japanese given name. Notable people with the name include:

- Honda Masamori (本多 正納) (1827–1885), Japanese daimyō
- Hotta Masamori (堀田 正盛) (1606–1651), Japanese daimyō
- Inaba Masamori (稲葉 正盛) (1791–1820), Japanese daimyō
- Masamori Tokuyama (徳山 昌守) (born 1974), Zainichi Korean boxer
- Obata Masamori (小幡 昌盛) (1534–1582), Japanese samurai
- Takanashi Masamori (高梨 政盛) (died 1513), Japanese samurai
- Tozawa Masamori (戸沢 政盛) (1585–1648), Japanese samurai and daimyō
