= Shiina Yasutane =

Shiina Yasutane (椎名 康胤, died March 1576) was a Japanese daimyō of the Sengoku period, who was lord of the Shiina clan of Etchū Province. Throughout the 1550s and 1560s, he led numerous attacks on the Jinbō clan, and in one of the few documented cases of two generals engaging personally in combat on the field, Yasutane fought with Jinbo clan's head, Jinbō Nagamoto, in 1554, at the battle of Imizu. During this particular clash, he was slashed across the jaw by Nagamoto, which left him with lifelong disfigurement. He is believed to have been assassinated in 1576 by Kojima Motoshige, on the orders of Uesugi Kenshin.
