= Kojima Yatarō =

Japanese samurai

- 小島弥太郎
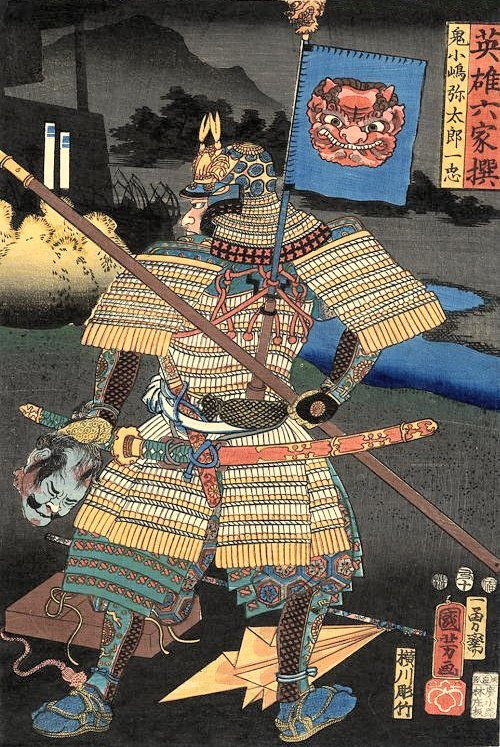
- Rear view of Oni-Kojima Yatarô Kazutada in armor with a sashimono, a woodblock print by Utagawa Kuniyoshi from the series Six Select Heroes
- Born: Yatarō; 1522; Harima Province or Mimasaka Province, Japan
- Died: 1 January 1582 (aged 60–61); Tenjinyama of Tochio Ohno cho, Nagaoka-shi, Niigata Prefecture.
- Cause of death: Battle
- Other names: Kojima Sadaoki; Kazutoshi, Katsutoshi, alias: Kyonosuke, His name: Oni Kojima

Kojima Yatarō (小島 弥太郎; 1522 – 1 January 1582) was a Japanese samurai of the Sengoku period, who served the Uesugi clan of Echigo Province. He was one of Uesugi Kenshin's leading generals. His ferocity in combat gave rise to his nickname, Demon Kojima (鬼小島, Oni Kojima).

He was also sometimes called "The Ogre" because his helmet had an image of a grinning oni, a mythical creature which has been translated as ogre or demon. His weapon was a kanabō, a weapon associated with ogres, and thus adding further to his reputation.
