= Usami Sadamitsu =

Japanese samurai of the Sengoku period

Usami Sadamitsu (宇佐美定満) also known as Usami Sadayuki (宇佐美定行) (1489 – August 11, 1564) was a Japanese samurai of the Sengoku period, who served the Uesugi clan of Echigo Province. He was the son of Usami Takatada.

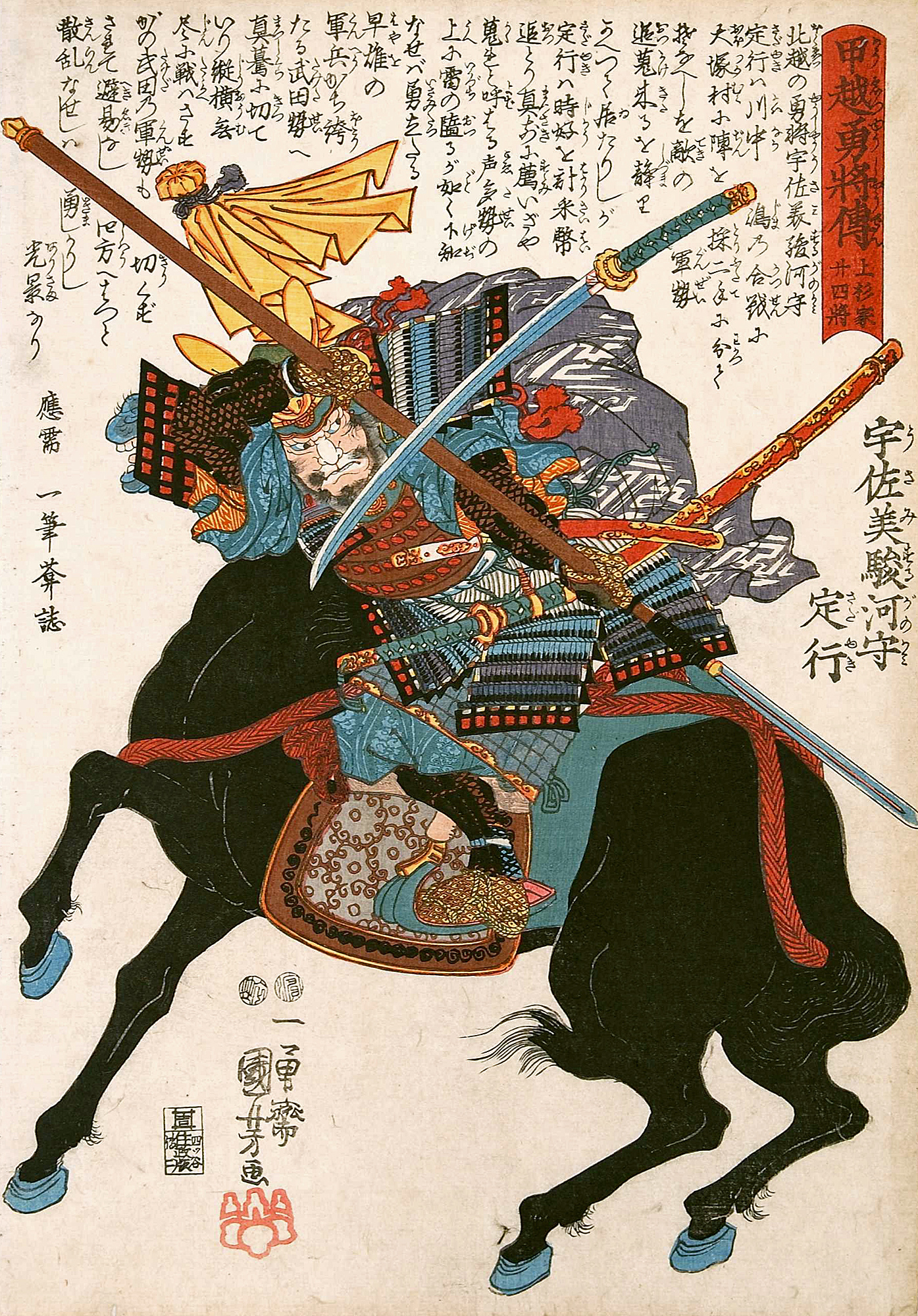
Usami Sadamitu.

Also known as Yoshikatsu, Sadayuki was one of Uesugi Kenshin's chief retainers. He was placed in charge of the messengers during the 4th Battle of Kawanakajima.

In 1564 Nagao Masakage made disparaging and insulting remarks about Kenshin (who was also the brother of his wife) and Kenshin thus ordered that he be put to death. Sadayuki invited Yoshikage to go boating on Lake Nojiri and then abruptly threw him overboard. After Kenshin's death, Yoshikage's son and successor Nagao Kagekatsu, swore vengeance against Sadayuki's own son Usami Katsuyuki. As a result, Katsuyuki left the service of the Uesugi clan and joined the army of Toyotomi Hideyoshi
