= Takanashi clan =

Japanese clan from present-day Nagano Prefecture

- Parent house: Kawachi Genji
- Founder: Takanashi Morimitsu
- Founding year: 12th century

The Takanashi clan (Japanese: 高梨氏) of Shinano Province were direct descendants of Minamoto no Yorisue, son of Yorinobu. One of the grandsons of Yorisue soon on took the name Takanashi. Takanashi Tadanao was a noted retainer of the Minamoto clan during the Genpei War. During the Sengoku Period, the Takanashi enjoyed much prosperity and expansion in the Shinano region, until being attacked by Takeda Shingen. When the Takeda clan invaded their territory in 1553, the Takanashi allied with the Murakami, Ogasawara, and Suda clans. However, they all turned to Uesugi Kenshin of Echigo Province for assistance. The Takanashi lost their domain, but they managed to stay as retainers of the Uesugi clan.
