= Female Uesugi Kenshin theory =

Theory about historical figure

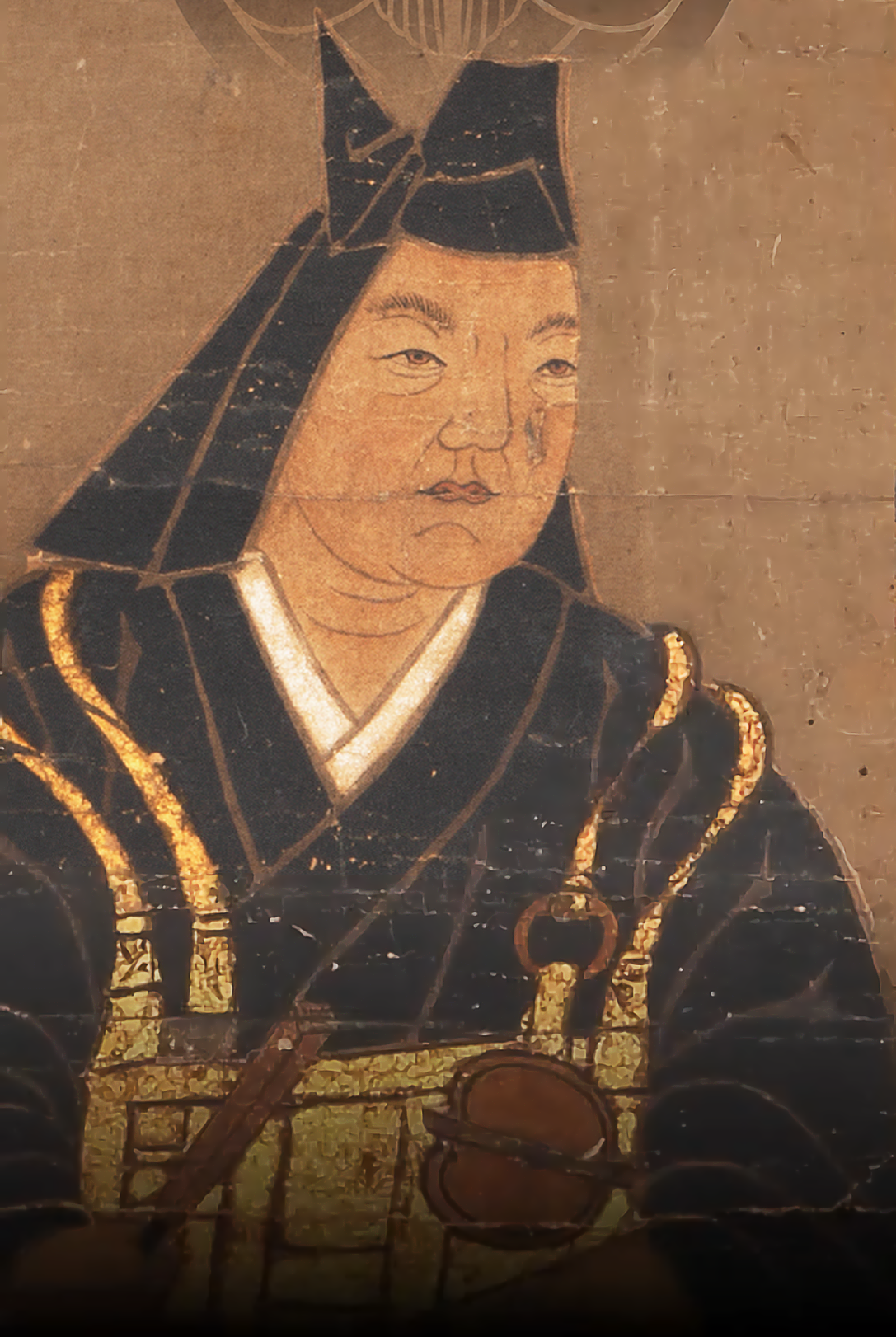
Uesugi Kenshin portrait close-up Rinsenji Temple (made circa 1580's)

Female Uesugi Kenshin Theory (上杉謙信女性説) is a hypothesis proposed by novelist Tomeo Yagiri in 1968, suggesting that Uesugi Kenshin, the daimyo of Echigo Province during the Sengoku period, might have actually been a woman.

== Theory ==
In the mid 20th century Japanese novelist Tomeo Yagiri theorized that Uesugi Kenshin was a woman after he discovered a report on 16th century Japan in the monastery of Toledo which was used as a fort during the Spanish Civil War. This report about Japan was written by a person named Gonzalez of Spain to King Philip II. In that report, Gonzalez refers to a certain Uesugi as "tia" (which means ''Aunt'' in Spanish and Portuguese) of Uesugi Kagekatsu, the biological son of Kenshin's sister. The discovery of this letter led the novelist to theorize that "in the West, Uesugi Kenshin is a woman". On this basis, Yagiri wrote the "Female Uesugi Kenshin theory" (上杉謙信女性説). Other evidence supporting this theory is that Kenshin had severe stomach cramps on a monthly basis around the 10th of the month (recorded in the Kōyō Gunkan) and actually planned his military campaigns around these cramps. The cause of Kenshin's death is recorded in Matsudaira Tadaaki's history "Tōdaiki" (当代記) as "大虫" (Daichu), which some interpret as a female term referring to menstruation or uterine cancer.

There is a theory that Kenshin died of a stroke while using the toilet. This theory is based on a misinterpretation of historical records, as Kenshin was recorded as having fallen ill and died. Some researchers propose alternative interpretations for the "大虫" (Daichu) term, suggesting it might refer to parasitic infestations rather than menstruation. Despite some acceptance of this theory in certain circles, there is no supporting evidence in historical documents. This interpretation could explain references to abdominal pain and suffering attributed to Kenshin, which might have been caused by intestinal blockages due to parasites.

According to some accounts of Kenshin's personal life, he had an interest in traditionally feminine subjects, such as historical novels, poetry, and calligraphy aimed at the female audience. Kenshin's appearance was reportedly feminine; portraits of Kenshin made in the Edo period (1600–1868) tried to reinforce a masculine appearance, while those of the Sengoku period (1467–1615) display a more female appearance, with fair skin and long hair. Kenshin was the only one allowed to freely enter the women's quarters in the Kyoto Imperial Palace, which was a rare occurrence. Kenshin had neither biological children nor wife or concubine. His relations with women and men are only written of in tales and nothing is historically proven.

Critics of this theory claim that women could not succeed to the leadership of a samurai clan. Advocates of the theory refute the critics by noting that women leaders of samurai clans were not entirely unknown during the 16th century, as was the case of Tachibana Ginchiyo, Ii Naotora, Lady Otsuya, Otazu, Onamihime and others. Although this theory is not considered valid in academia, it has impacted Kenshin's representation in culture and popular imagination. Various fictional works have utilized the femininity theory, portraying Kenshin as female or featuring gender-neutral interpretations. These include novels, manga, and video games, each incorporating elements of the theory in their narratives or character designs. Additionally, some adaptations of historical events, like NHK's Taiga drama "Fuurin Kazan," have drawn inspiration from the theory by portraying Kenshin as a feminine or androgynous bishōnen, counter to Kenshin's masculine portrayals in many Edo-period portrayals.

In fact, it is said that Kenshin's body was not cremated but preserved with armor and lacquer and has been enshrined in the Yonezawa Uesugi clan cemetery since 1876. However, due to the Uesugi family's reverence for the remains as sacred objects, no academic research has been allowed.
