= Takanashi Masayori =

Japanese samurai retained by the Uesugi clan

Takanashi Masayori (高梨政頼) (died 1581) was a retainer beneath the clan of Uesugi throughout the latter Sengoku period of Feudal Japan. Masayori was the eldest son of Shinano warlord Takanashi Sumiyori and supported his father's intent to restore their land after Takeda Shingen claimed it as his own.

As Masayori thus became a retainer to the powerful Uesugi Kenshin in prospect of achieving this goal, he fought under the former's banner throughout the Third and Fourth Battles of Kawanakajima. As a result of Masayori's service he became known as one of Kenshin's Twenty-Eight Generals. Despite this, Masayori did not support his lord following Kawanakajima in 1561, but chose the Ogasawara as a new master.
