= Jinbō Nagamoto =

Japanese samurai

- 神保 長職
- Born: Unknown; Etchū Province
- Died: After 1570
- Military career
- Rank: Daimyō
- Commands: Toyama Castle, Tomisaki Castle, Masuyama Castle
- Conflicts: Siege of Toyama castle, Siege of Masuyama castle

Jinbō Nagamoto (神保 長職; fl. 1560s) was a Japanese samurai and commander of the Sengoku period. He was the head of the Jinbō clan and Shugodai of the Etchū Province.

In the mid-16th century, the Jinbō clan was the most powerful clan in the Etchū province. Sometimes it feuded with the Shiina clan led by Nagamoto's rival Shiina Yasutane. One such feud was the battle of Imizu in 1554, where, in one of the few documented cases of two generals engaging personally in combat on the field, Nagamoto slashed Yasutane across the jaw and disfigured him for the rest of his life. Uesugi Kenshin of the Uesugi clan began mediating their disputes in the early 1560s, but soon sided with the Shiina. Although Nagamoto surrendered when he was attacked by Kenshin at Toyama Castle in 1570, Kenshin expelled him from Toyama.
