= Takanashi Masamori =

Takanashi Masamori (高梨政盛) (died 1513) was a Japanese samurai of the Sengoku period, who ruled an area of central Shinano Province (modern-day Nagano Prefecture). He was allied with Nagao Tamekage.

== Family ==
His father was Takanashi Masataka; his son was Takanashi Sumiyori. He was the grandfather of Takanashi Masayori.
