= Battle of Tonegawa =

1571 Japanese battle

Date	1571
Location	Tonegawa, Kozuke province 36°40′43″N 138°59′57″E
Result	disengagement

Belligerents
Uesugi forces	Takeda forces

Commanders and leaders
Uesugi Kenshin	Takeda Shingen
- Location within Gunma Prefecture Battle of Tonegawa (Japan)

The Battle of Tonegawa was the last battle between Uesugi Kenshin and Takeda Shingen during the final years of the Sengoku period (16th century) of Japan .

During the year of 1571, the famed Uesugi Kenshin had advanced to the province of Kozuke and attacked the satellite castle of Takeda Shingen --Ishikura castle--. Shingen responded to Kenshin's attack, in which both forces met each other in a stand-off across the Tonegawa river. The opponents eventually disengaged each other after a well-fought battle.
