= Uesugi clan =

Japanese clan

Uesugi 上杉
- The emblem (mon) of the Uesugi clan
- Home province: Tanba; Echigo; Dewa
- Parent house: Fujiwara clan (藤原氏)
- Titles: Various
- Founder: Uesugi Shigefusa
- Current head: Uesugi Kuninori
- Founding year: Late 13th century
- Dissolution: still extant
- Ruled until: 1868 (Abolition of the han system)
- Cadet branches: Ōgigayatsu Uesugi; Inukake Uesugi; Yamanouchi Uesugi

The Uesugi clan (上杉氏, Uesugi-shi, historically also Uyesugi) is a Japanese samurai clan which was at its peak one of the most powerful during the Muromachi and Sengoku periods (14th to 17th centuries). At its height, the clan had three main branches: the Ōgigayatsu, Inukake, and Yamanouchi. Its best-known member is the warlord Uesugi Kenshin (1530–1578).

During the Edo period, the Uesugi were a tozama or outsider clan, in contrast with the fudai or insider daimyō clans which had been hereditary vassals or allies of the Tokugawa clan.

== History ==
The clan claims descent from the Fujiwara clan, specifically Fujiwara no Yoshikado, who was a daijō-daijin during the 9th century.

Kanjūji Shigefusa was a 13th generation descendant of the clan's great progenitor and the originator of the clan's name. Near the end of the 13th century, he received the Uesugi domain in Tango Province and adopted the name "Uesugi" after arriving and establishing himself there.

=== Muromachi period ===
Throughout the Muromachi period, members of the clan were appointed as shugo (provincial governors) and would also regularly hold sway over the post Kantō Kanrei (shogun's deputy in Kantō).

Through their dominance of this position, the clan gained a large amount of power in the Kantō region. In 1449, Kantō Kanrei Ashikaga Shigeuji killed his Uesugi deputy in order to check the family's power. However, Uesugi forces rose up throughout the region and drove out Shigeuji. After ousting the Kanrei, they asked the shogunate in Kyoto for a different deputy to be placed in power.

The Uesugi's deposition of Shigeuji left them as the predominant power in the Kantō region, and the clan was able to grow rapidly. They eventually split into their three main branches, which were named after their traditional homelands. The Ōgigayatsu controlled Kawagoe Castle, the Yamanouchi were centered in Hirai, and the Inukake held a castle in the region as well. Each of these branch families can trace their lineage to Uesugi Kiyoko, mother of Ashikaga Takauji, the founder of the Ashikaga shogunate.

These three branches would commence infighting for dominance within the clan and the Kantō region almost as soon as the split occurred. This conflict would continue for roughly twenty-five years until around the end of the Ōnin War in 1477, which brought the end of the Ashikaga shogunate. Though the Ōgigayatsu and Yamanouchi branches both survived this conflict, the Inukake did not.

=== Sengoku period ===
Traditionally, the Ōgigayatsu branch allied themselves with the Ōta clan, while the Yamanouchi were aligned with the Nagao clan. While the Ōgigayatsu were less numerous than the Yamanouchi, they held on to power due to Ōta Dōkan's construction of the Edo Castle in the 1450s. At the same time as the Uesugi branches continued to compete for power with themselves, the Hōjō clan began to gain power in the lower area of the Kantō region. The first head of this rising clan, Hōjō Sōun, allied himself with Nagao Tamekage, Deputy Constable of Kamakura, and would go on to become one of their strongest rivals.

This rapid expansion of a rival clan forced the two rival branches of the Uesugi to become allies. In 1537, the city of Kawagoe fell to the Hōjō clan. By 1545, the united Uesugi launched a campaign to regain their power in the region and retake lost possessions. However, the Ōgigayatsu branch would ultimately come to an end with the death of Uesugi Tomosada during a failed siege of Kawagoe castle later that year.

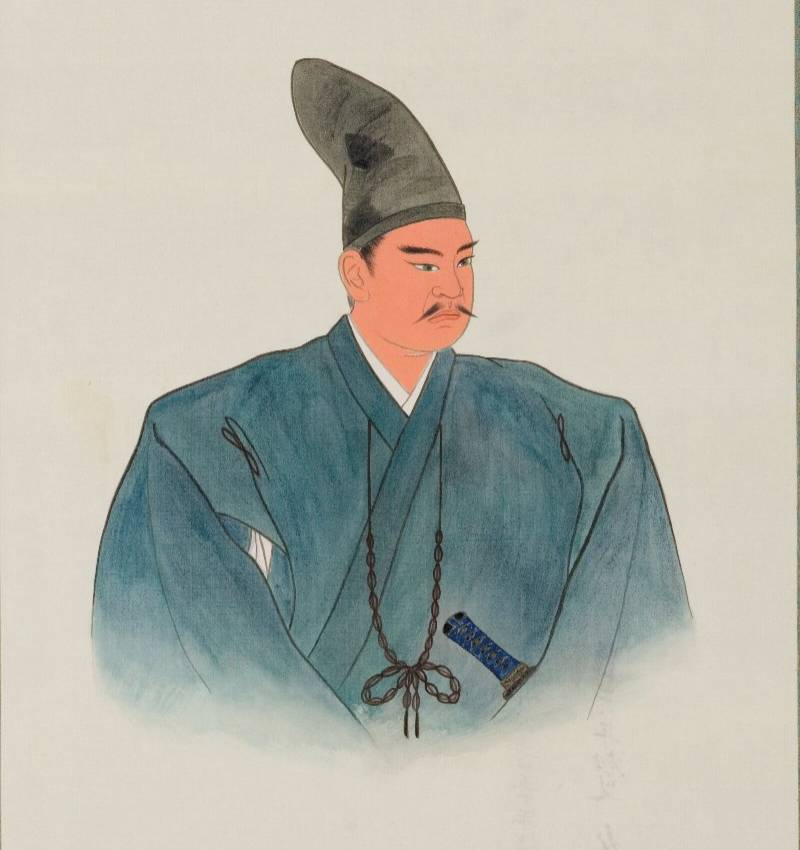
Uesugi Kagekatsu

Near the end of the Sengoku period, the Uesugi would undergo major changes in their leadership. Uesugi Norimasa, holder of a castle which had fallen in 1551 to the Hōjō, took up arms with his retainer Nagao Kagetora. Kagetora would go on to change his name to Uesugi Kenshin after campaigning against the Hōjō in Sagami Province. Kenshin would later become one of Sengoku's most prominent generals, continuing to wage war against the Hōjō for control of the Kantō region. Kenshin's adopted son Uesugi Kagekatsu eventually became head of the Uesugi clan. However, his support of Ishida Mitsunari during the battle of Sekigahara would result in a devastating blow to the power of the Uesugi, as Mitsunari's forces were crushed by Tokugawa Ieyasu and his supporters.

=== Edo period ===
During the Edo period, the Uesugi were given the domain of Yonezawa, a Tozama daimyō worth 300,000 koku. The domain, located far from the capital in the Tōhoku region, was considered fairly representative of what might be given to daimyō considered "outsiders" by the shogunate. Yonezawa had minimal direct control from the shogunate, but was not urbanized and was largely an agricultural domain.

Despite agricultural advances and generally high growth in the 17th century, Yonezawa, like most parts of the country, experienced a considerable drop in growth after 1700. The official koku revenue of the Uesugi daimyō was cut in half in 1664, but the family maintained its same expensive lifestyle as before. After Yonezawa entered debt and experienced famine in the 1750s, the current daimyō Uesugi Shigesada considered giving the territory back to the shogunate. Instead, he allowed his adopted son Uesugi Harunori to take over as daimyō. Through agricultural and moral reforms, as well as other strict policies, Harunori was able to restore a measure of prosperity to the domain. After his death, the shogunate officially praised Yonezawa as an example of good governance.

=== Bakumatsu ===
When the Uesugi clan faced the threat of abolition due to the sudden death of Tsunakatsu (1639–64), they were saved by Hoshina Masayuki. In the Boshin War (1868–69), to repay this favor, the Yonezawa Domain rose to assist the Aizu Domain in its time of crisis. Alongside the Sendai Domain (Date clan), they led the Northern Alliance (Ōuetsu Reppan Dōmei) and fought against the new government forces, but after repeated defeats, they eventually surrendered.

=== Meiji period and modern era ===
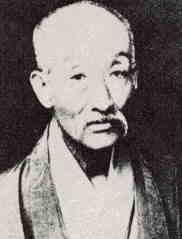
Uesugi Mochinori

The Meiji Restoration in 1868 brought the abolition of the han system, that is, the end of the domains, the feudal lords, and the samurai class. During this period, the head of the clan was Uesugi Mochinori. While the han system ended, the Uesugi clan survives to this day. Its present head, Uesugi Kuninori (born 1942), is a professor at the Institute of Space and Astronautical Science, Ministry of Education.

== Crests and banners ==
The clan crest of the Uesugi was two flying sparrows in bamboo.

Uesugi Kenshin had several personal standards: the first character in Bishamonten (毘, bi), a flag of divine appointment, an open fan horse insignia, and the suspended and chaotically written dragon character (龍).

== Notable members and retainers ==
=== Members ===
- Uesugi Shigefusa (13th century)
- Uesugi Norifusa (died 1355)
- Uesugi Shigeyoshi (died 1349)
- Uesugi Akiyoshi (died 1351)
- Uesugi Yoshinori (died 1378)
- Uesugi Noriharu (died 1379)
- Uesugi Norikata (1335–1394)
- Uesugi Norimoto (1383–1418)
- Uesugi Norizane (1410–1466)
- Uesugi Kiyokata (died 1442)
- Uesugi Fusaaki (1432–1466)
- Uesugi Noritada (1433–1454)
- Uesugi Akisada (1454–1510)
- Uesugi Tomooki (1488–1537)
- Uesugi Norimasa (1522–1579)
- Uesugi Tomosada (1525–1546)
- Uesugi Kenshin (1530–1578)
- Uesugi Kagetora (1552–1579)
- Uesugi Kagekatsu (1555–1623)
- Uesugi Harunori (1751–1822)

=== Retainers ===
- Amakasu Kagemochi
- Ayukawa Kiyonaga
- Honjō Shigenaga
- Honjō Saneyori
- Honjō Hidetsuna
- Irobe Katsunaga
- Jōjō Masashige
- Kakizaki Kageie
- Kawada Nagachika
- Kitajō Takahiro
- Kitajō Kagehiro
- Kojima Motoshige
- Kojima Yatarō
- Maeda Toshimasu
- Murakami Yoshikiyo
- Nakajō Fujikasuke
- Nakajō Kageyasu
- Naoe Kagetsuna
- Naoe Kanetsugu
- Ōkuma Tomohide
- Saitō Tomonobu
- Sanponji Sadanaga
- Shibata Naganori
- Shibata Shigeie
- Suda Mitsuchika
- Kojima Motoshige
- Suibara Takaie
- Takemata Yoshitsuna
- Usami Sadamitsu
- Yamayoshi Toyomori
- Yasuda Akimoto
- Yasuda Nagahide
- Yoshie Kagesuke

== Castles ==
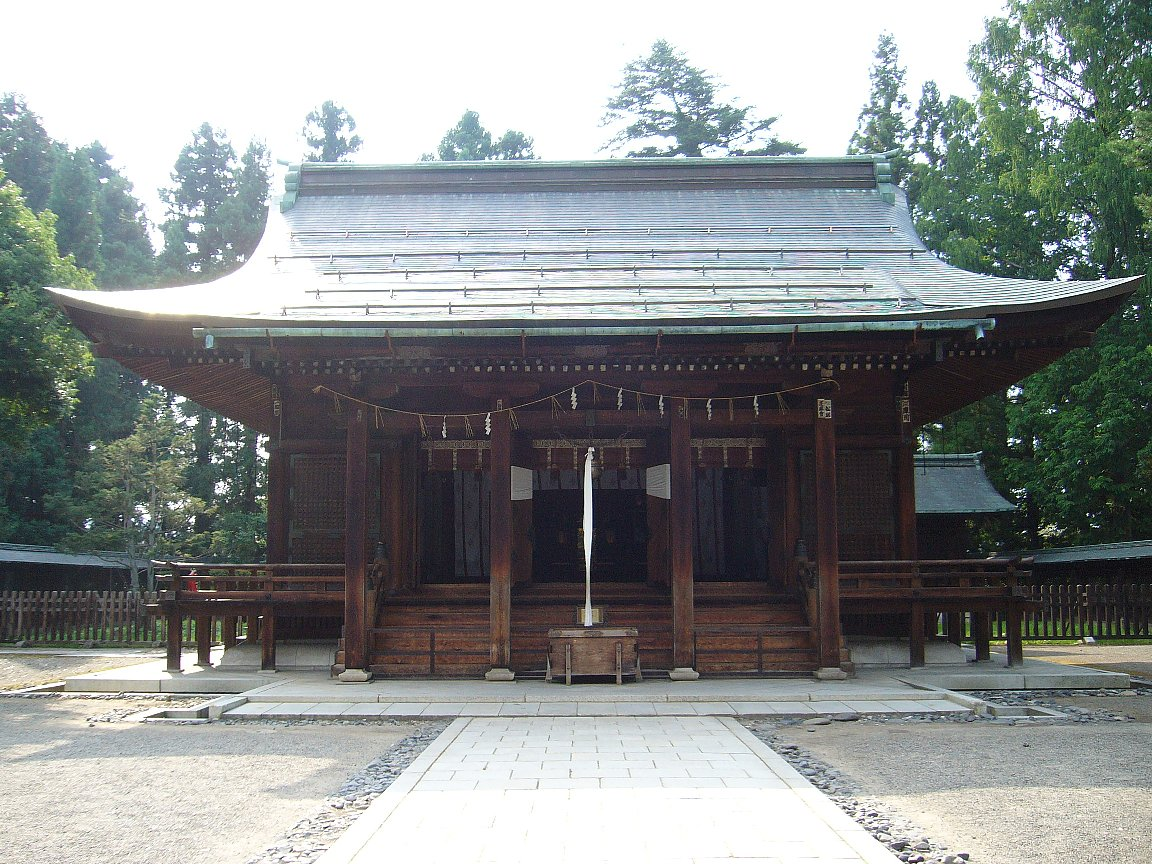
An Uesugi shrine

- Kasugayama Castle
- Tochio Castle: Honjō Saneyori
- Sakado Castle: Nagao Masakage
- Kitajō Castle: Kitajō Takahiro
- Yoita Castle: Naoe Kanetsugu
- Moto-Yoita Castle: Naoe Kanetsugu
- Nechi Castle: Murakami Yoshikiyo
- Akada castle: Saito Tomonobu
- Masagata Castle: Amakasu Kagemochi
- Jōjō Castle: Jōjō Masashige
- Kakizaki Castle: Kakizaki Kageie
- Yasuda Castle: Yasuda Nagahide

== See also ==
- Japanese cryptology from the 1500s to Meiji
