= Uesugi Akisada =

Samurai of the Uesugi clan

Uesugi Akisada (上杉 顕定; 1454 – July 25, 1510) was a Japanese samurai lord during the Sengoku period. He served as Kantō Kanrei and shugo daimyo (governor) of Kōzuke and Musashi Province. His loss of Izu Province to Hōjō Sōun in 1492–1498 marked a significant development of the Sengoku period. He was a member of the Uesugi clan.

Nagao Tamekage, rose up against him in 1510 with the help of Hōjō Sōun, seizing Izu Province and killing Akisada. Sōun, with Tamekage's help, would go on to conquer some of Sagami Province, and become one of the most major figures of the Sengoku period. Tamekage's son Uesugi Kenshin would likewise become a major samurai lord of the period, his rise with the Kantō as the center of his power base, as the result of Akisada's loss, a crucial element to his success.

== See also ==
- Uesugi clan
