= Kojima Motoshige =

Japanese samurai of the Sengoku period

Kojima Motoshige (小島 職鎮; birth and death dates unknown) was a Japanese samurai of the Sengoku period who served the Uesugi clan. Prior to joining the Uesugi, Kojima had been a senior vassal of Jinbō Nagamoto. In 1582, he provoke a Ikkō-ikki and took Toyama Castle.
