= Takanashi Sumiyori =

Japanese samurai

Takanashi Sumiyori (高梨澄頼) (died 1576) was a Japanese samurai of the Sengoku period, who ruled an area in central Shinano Province (modern-day Nagano Prefecture). Takanashi Masayori was his son.

His Takanashi faction destroyed the Nakano rōnin and in turn were attacked by the Shimazu Sadatada faction.
