= Nagao Tamekage =

Japanese feudal lord

- 長尾 為景

Head of Nagao clan
- In office 1506–1536
- Preceded by: Nagao Yoshikage
- Succeeded by: Nagao Harukage

Personal details
- Born: c. 1486 or 1489
- Died: December, 1536 or January 29, 1543
- Children: Nagao Harukage; Aya-Gozen; Uesugi Kenshin
- Parent: Nagao Yoshikage (father)

Military service
- Allegiance: Uesugi clan
- Rank: Lord (Daimyō)
- Unit: Nagao clan
- Battles/wars: Siege of Matsunoyama (1507); Battle of Sendanno (1536)

Nagao Clan Crest

Nagao Tamekage (長尾 為景; c. 1486 or 1489 – December, 1536 or January 29, 1543) was a retainer of Japanese feudal lord Uesugi Fusayoshi, and a daimyō in his own right, during Japan's Sengoku period. He is perhaps best known as the biological father of Nagao Kagetora, who would be adopted into the Uesugi clan as Uesugi Kenshin, and has become one of the most famous Sengoku-period daimyōs.

== Biography ==
Tamekage was born as the son of Nagao Yoshikage, the deputy military governor of Echigo Province. His mother came from the Takanashi clan of Shinano.

According to George Bailey Sansom, Nagao Tamekage's career makes him representative of the emergence of the daimyōs, and the shift of regional power from the shugo (constables ), governors, and other government officials to independent lords.

Serving as Deputy (shugo-dai) to Fusayoshi, shugo of Echigo Province, Tamekage led his lord's Yamanouchi Uesugi forces to victory against the Ōgigayatsu Uesugi in a series of conflicts from 1500–1505. However, one of a number of nari-agari mono (成り上がり者), or "upstarts" of this period, Tamekage sought to usurp his lord, and battled with Uesugi forces a number of times in the first decade of the 16th century.

In 1506, after Yoshikage was killed in action at the Battle of Hannyano, the Igarashi and Ishida clans of the Chūetsu area (central part of Echigo) rebelled, but this was pacified before long by Tamekage who had succeeded his father as head of the Echigo-Nagao clan.

He ultimately laid siege to Uesugi Fusayoshi in 1507, at Matsunoyama in Echigo Province, and Fusayoshi was killed. Tamekage then went on to pursue a number of campaigns of his own, gathering territory and power.

In 1510, Tamekage plotted with Jinbo Nagakiyo in an attempt to overtake the Jinbo clan from within, using his status as shugo-dai to bring Nagakiyo to his side. Nagakiyo then brought his brother Jinbo Nagatsuna into the plot, which revolved around overthrowing Jinbo Yoshimune and allying with the Uesugi. The plot stretched longer than a year, and Tamekage's patience grew thin. It is believed that Tamekage "arranged" for correspondence between himself and the brothers to be discovered by an ally of Yoshimune, which would lead to their executions, perhaps a quicker route to weakening the Jinbo than the possibly ill-conceived plot with Nagakiyo. The Jinbo brothers were executed, and the Jinbo weakened.

Tamekage then engaged Uesugi Akisada, and defeated him as well, with the help of Hōjō Sōun, another growing power in the region. Within a few years, Nagao and Hōjō brought about the complete collapse of the Uesugi clan.

== Death ==
In 1536, he was reportedly defeated and killed at the Battle of Sendanno against the Ikkō-ikki of Kaga Province. However, the Senran-ki records him stepping down in favor of his third son and becoming a monk in 1540.
