= Nagao Harukage =

Daimyo

- 長尾 晴景

Head of Nagao clan
- In office 1536–1548
- Preceded by: Nagao Tamekage
- Succeeded by: Uesugi Kenshin

Personal details
- Born: 1509
- Died: March 23, 1553 (aged 43–44)
- Parent: Nagao Tamekage (father)
- Relatives: Uesugi Kenshin (brother)

Military service
- Allegiance: Uesugi clan
- Rank: Lord (Daimyō)
- Unit: Nagao clan

Nagao Harukage (長尾 晴景; 1509 – March 23, 1553) was Uesugi Kenshin's older brother, and successor to his father Nagao Tamekage in 1536.

It would seem that Harukage hadn't proven the most effective or inspiring leader (probably due to ill health), and his failure to exert control and gain support of the powerful kokujin families had resulted in a situation which was nearly to the point of tearing the province apart.

As the story is told, at first Kenshin was reluctant to take the field against his own brother, but was eventually convinced that it was necessary to the survival of Echigo.

Kenshin succeeded in wresting control of the clan from Harukage in 1548. Harukage stepped down from the lead of the clan and provincial government, and gave the titles to his younger brother. Harukage died five years later in 1553.

== Bibliography ==
- Goldsmith, Brian (2008). Amassing Economies: The Medieval Origins of Early Modern Japan, 1450–1700. ISBN 9780549851158.
