= Yasuda Nagahide =

Japanese military commander

Yasuda Nagahide (安田長秀) (1517 – May 8, 1582?) was a Japanese Military commander (武将, Bushou), who served the Uesugi clan (上杉氏, Uesugishi), during the Sengoku period and assisted with the construction of Yasuda Castle.

Nagahide was a trusted retainer of Kenshin's. He fought in the left flank at the 4th Battle of Kawanakajima (1561) and received a personal commendation from Kenshin for his bravery in the action. He supported Uesugi Kagekatsu during the Siege of Otate (1578).
