= Kasugayama Castle =

Sengoku period yamashiro-style Japanese castle located in Niigata prefecture

- 春日山城
- Jōetsu, Niigata, Japan
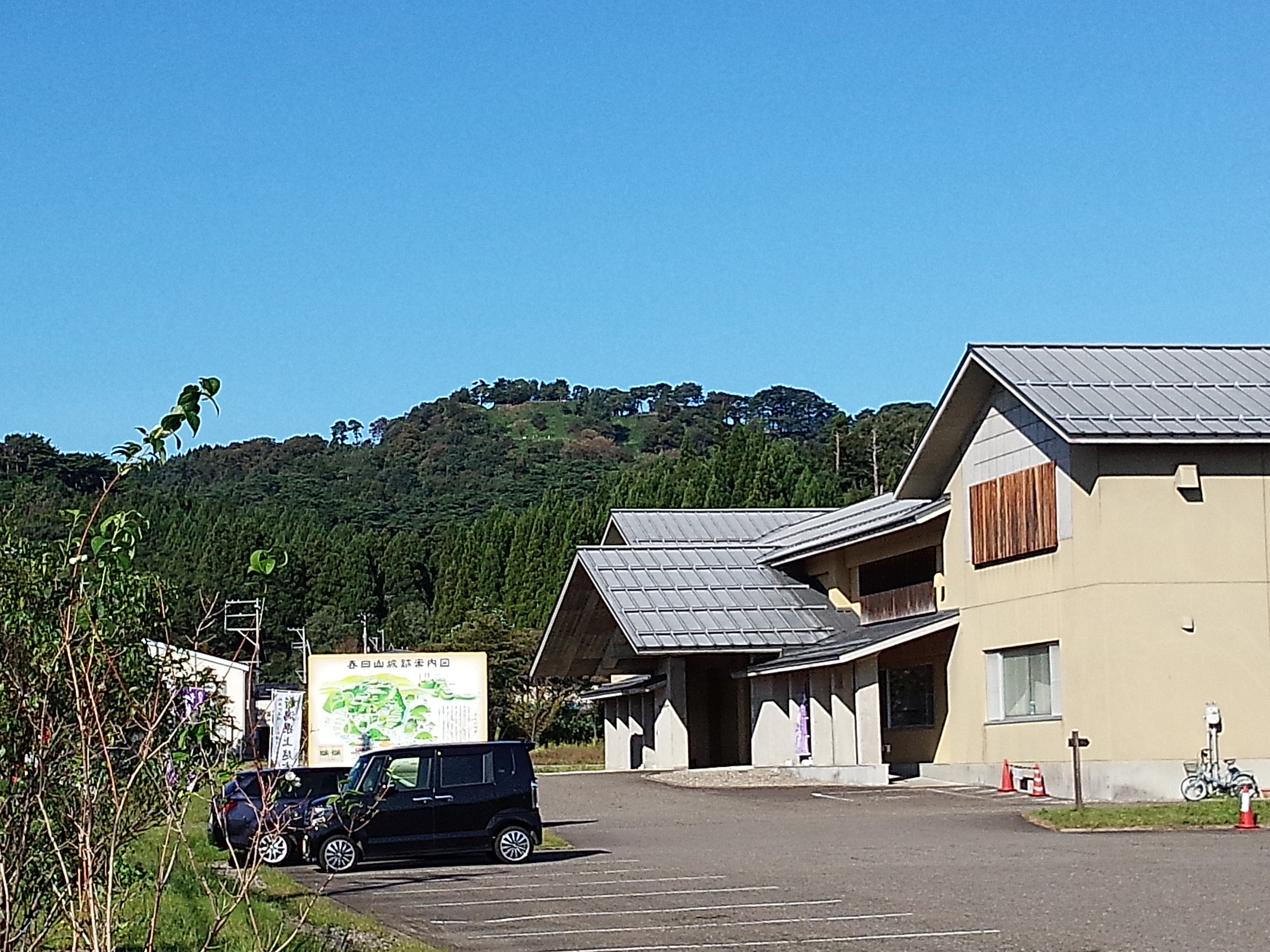
- Kasugayama Castle from Jōetsu-shi Maizō Bunkazai Center

Site information
- Type: yamashiro-style Japanese castle
- Controlled by: Nagao clan, Uesugi clan, Hori clan
- Condition: Ruins; only earthwork walls and dry moat remain

Location
- Coordinates: 37°08′50″N 138°12′20″E

Site history
- Built: Year Unknown
- Built by: Nagao clan
- In use: until 1607

Garrison information
- Past commanders: Nagao Tamekage, Uesugi Kenshin, Uesugi Kagekatsu

Kasugayama Castle (春日山城, Kasugayama-jō) is a Sengoku period yamashiro-style Japanese castle located in the Nakayashiki neighborhood of the city of Jōetsu, Niigata prefecture. It was the primary fortress of the warlord Uesugi Kenshin, and was originally built and ruled by the Nagao clan. It is listed as one of Japan's Top 100 Castles and the ruins have been protected as a National Historic Site since 1935. The castle and its history were mentioned by Takizawa Bakin, and Yamazaki Yoshishige in Tanki manroku. Kasugayama Castle is regarded as among Japan's Five Greatest Mountain Castles, along with Nanao Castle, Odani Castle, Kannonji Castle and Gassantoda Castle. The castle is unofficially called Hachigamine Castle (鉢ヶ峰城, Hachigamine-jō).

== Background ==
Kasugayama Castle extended over two ridges on the summit of 180-meter Mount Kasuga. The castle had no stone walls but consisted of many enclosures (kuruwa) with earthen or clay ramparts and dry moats built on terraces at various levels on the mountain. The core of the castle (or inner bailey) was just below the peak, and contained a watch tower, Buddhist temple (and Uesugi Kenshin's residence) and garden. On the south ridge was the fortified residence of Uesugi Kagekatsu, the adopted son of Kenshin, below which was the residence of Kakizaki Kageie, one of Kenshin's most important retainers. On the north ridge was the residence of Naoe Kagetsuna, another important retainer. Immediately below the central area was the residence of Uesugi Kagetora, another adopted son of Kenshin. In addition to these major enclosures were many smaller enclosures for retainers and barracks for soldiers, as well as warehouses. The castle is the centre of a defensive network consisting of many smaller forts in a two to six km, radius.

== History ==
There was an older castle on this site that dates to the 14th century, but there's no certain information about it. The Kasugayama Castle was probably built by Nagao Tamekage, and then was inherited by Nagao Harukage. Uesugi Kenshin, his younger brother who was originally named Nagao Kagetora, became the lord of the castle in 1548. This castle was Uesugi Kenshin's departure point in his engagement with Takeda Shingen in the 1561 Battle of Kawanakajima.

After his death in 1578, Uesugi Kagekatsu gained control of Kasugayama, after a brief series of battles with Uesugi Kagetora over the inheritance. Although Uesugi Kagekatsu was able to reunite the Uesugi clan, his forces were severely weakened by the ongoing struggle against Oda Nobunaga and the Odawara Hōjō clan. The Uesugi eventually submitted to Toyotomi Hideyoshi, and in 1598 the clan was transferred by Hideyoshi to Aizu. Kasugayama Castle was turned over to Hori Hideharu, the son of Hori Hidemasa. Hideharu built a large water moat to surround the jōkamachi of Kasugayama as the local populace was highly upset over the departure of the Uesugi, and in 1600 he relocated his seat to Fukushima Castle near the coast and port of Naoetsu. By 1607, Kasugayama was deserted.

A Shinto shrine, Kasugayama Shrine was founded in 1901 at the base of the mountain. The ruins of the inner bailey are located 180 m.a.s.l., with view at the city of Jōetsu, Kubiki Plain, and the Sea of Japan, approximately 20 minutes on foot from the shrine.

No structures survive within the castle grounds, but one gate has been preserved nearby at the temple of Rinsen-ji Temple, which also has a small museum. Also Jōetsu-shi Maizō Bunkazai Center (Historical museum) is near the castle.

== Gallery ==
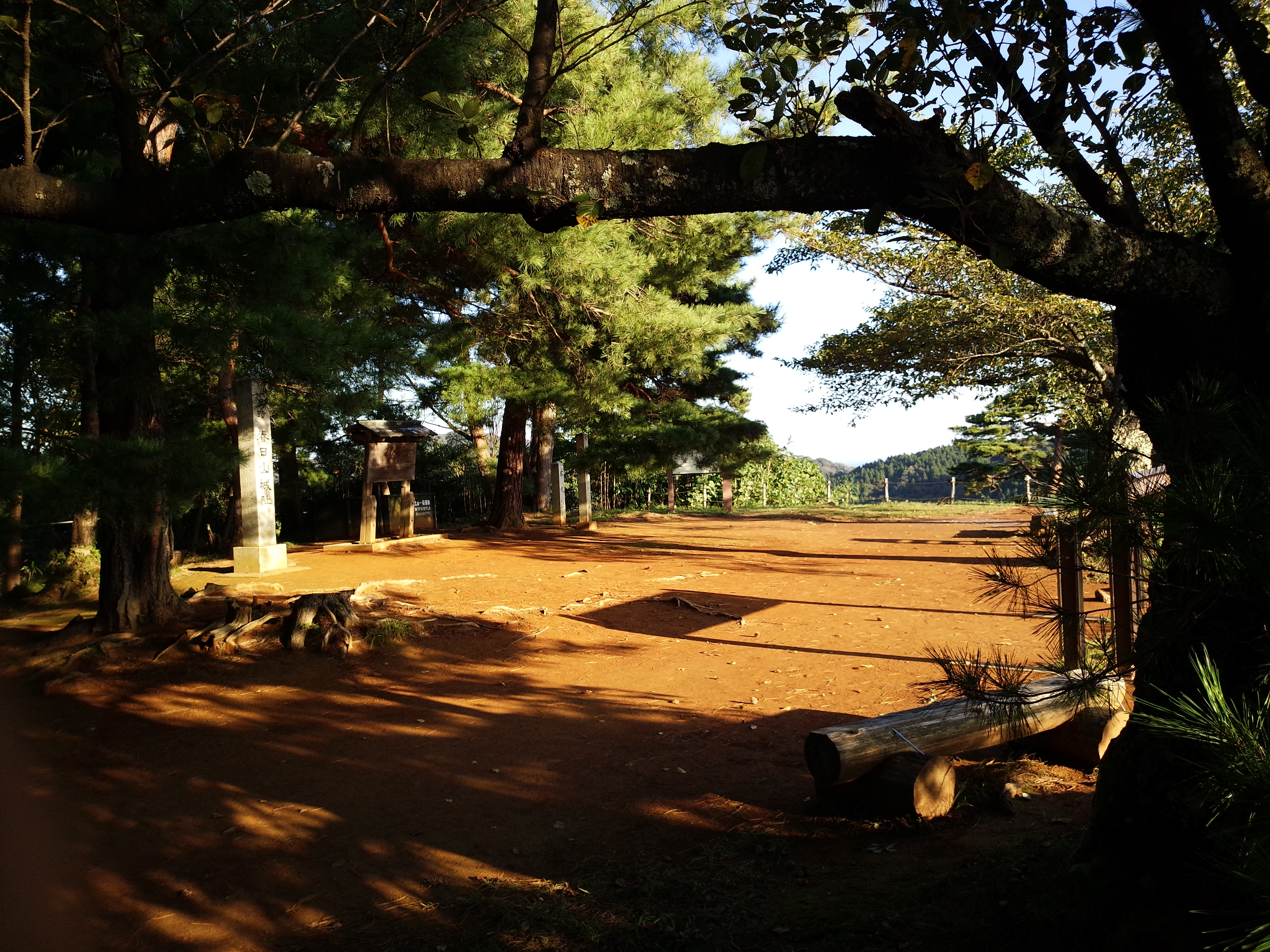
Honmaru compound of Kasugayama castle

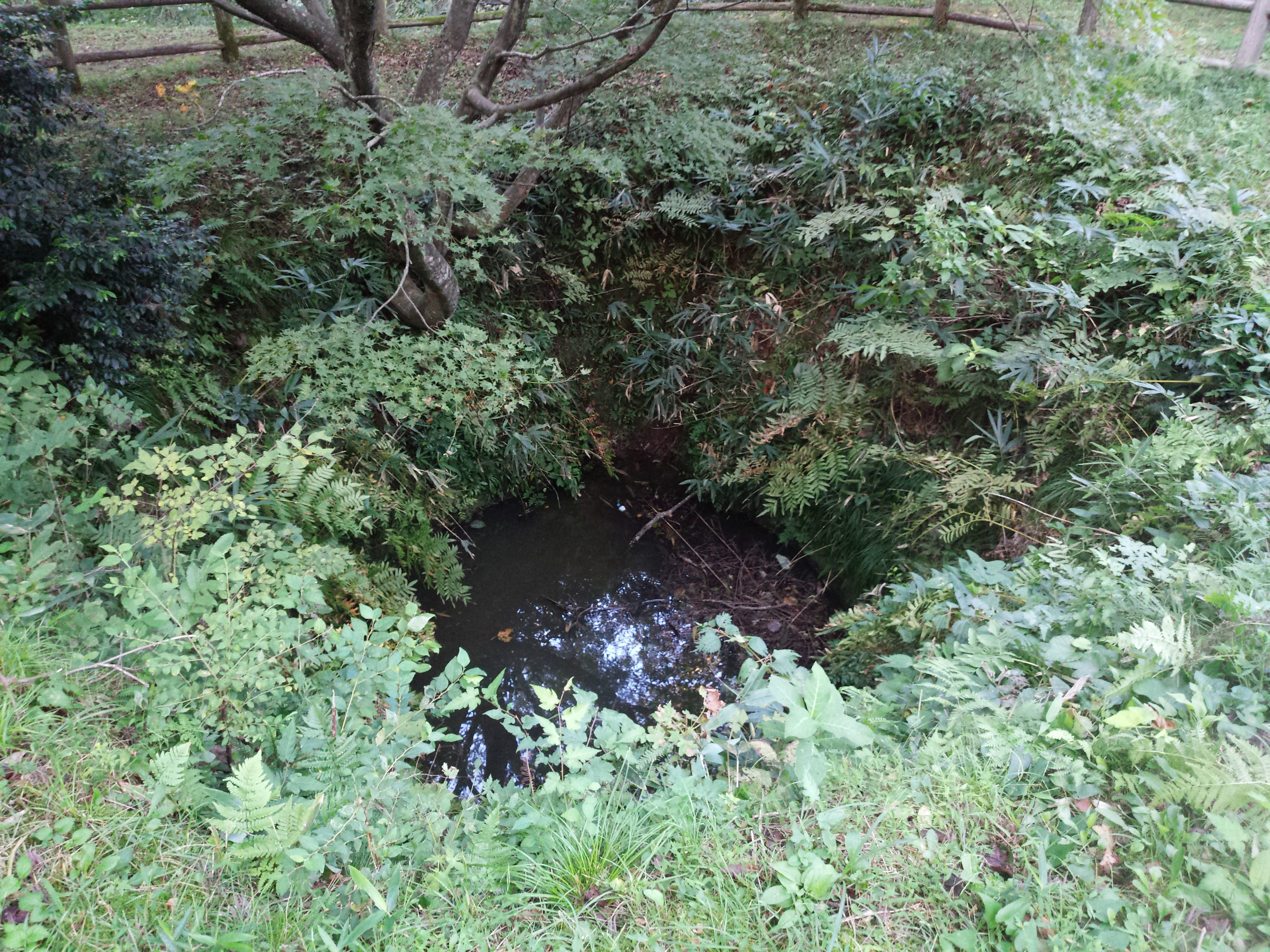
Well of Kasugayama castle

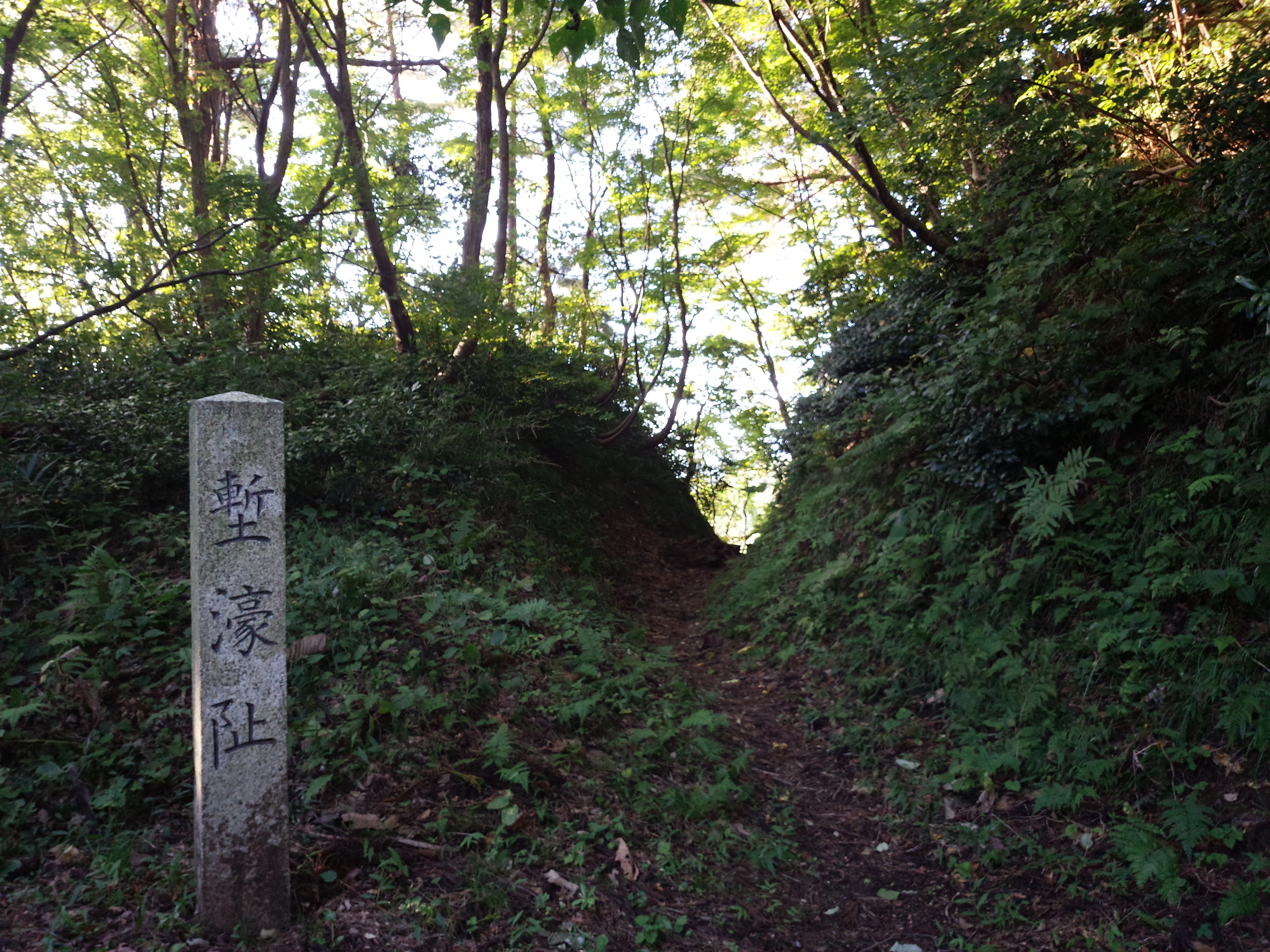
Horikiri style moat of Kasugayama castle

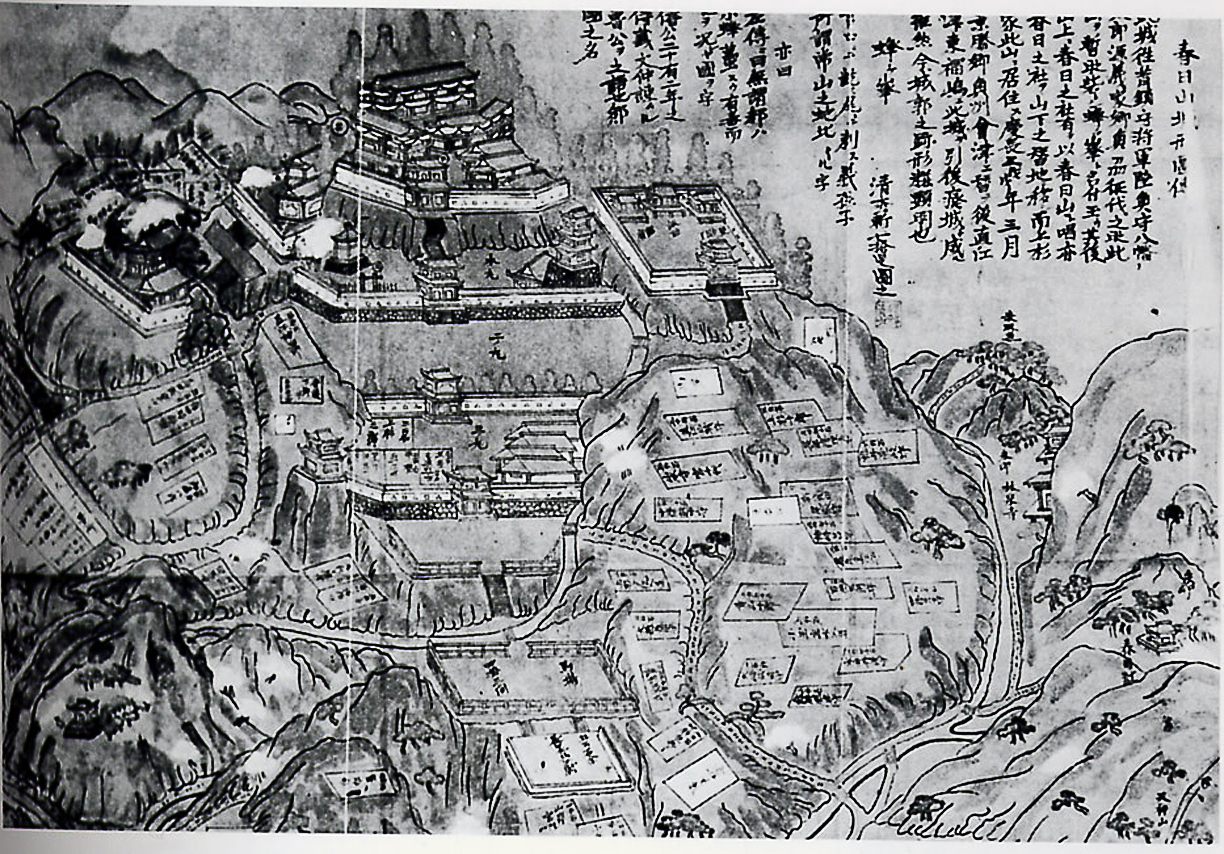
An old print showing Kasugayama Castle

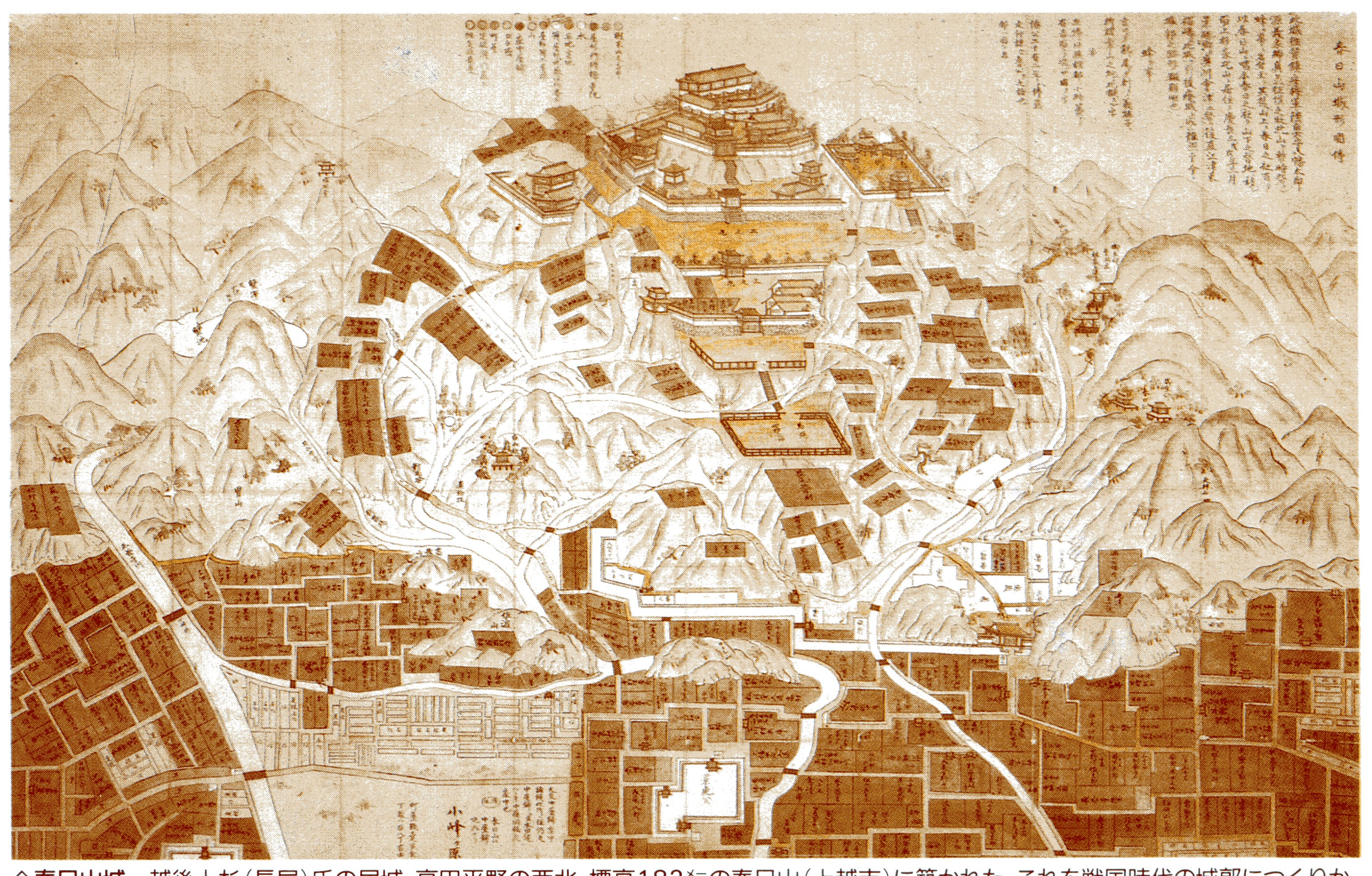
New print of the old map

== See also ==
- List of Historic Sites of Japan (Niigata)
