= Uesugi Kenshin =

Japanese daimyo (1530–1578)

- 上杉 謙信
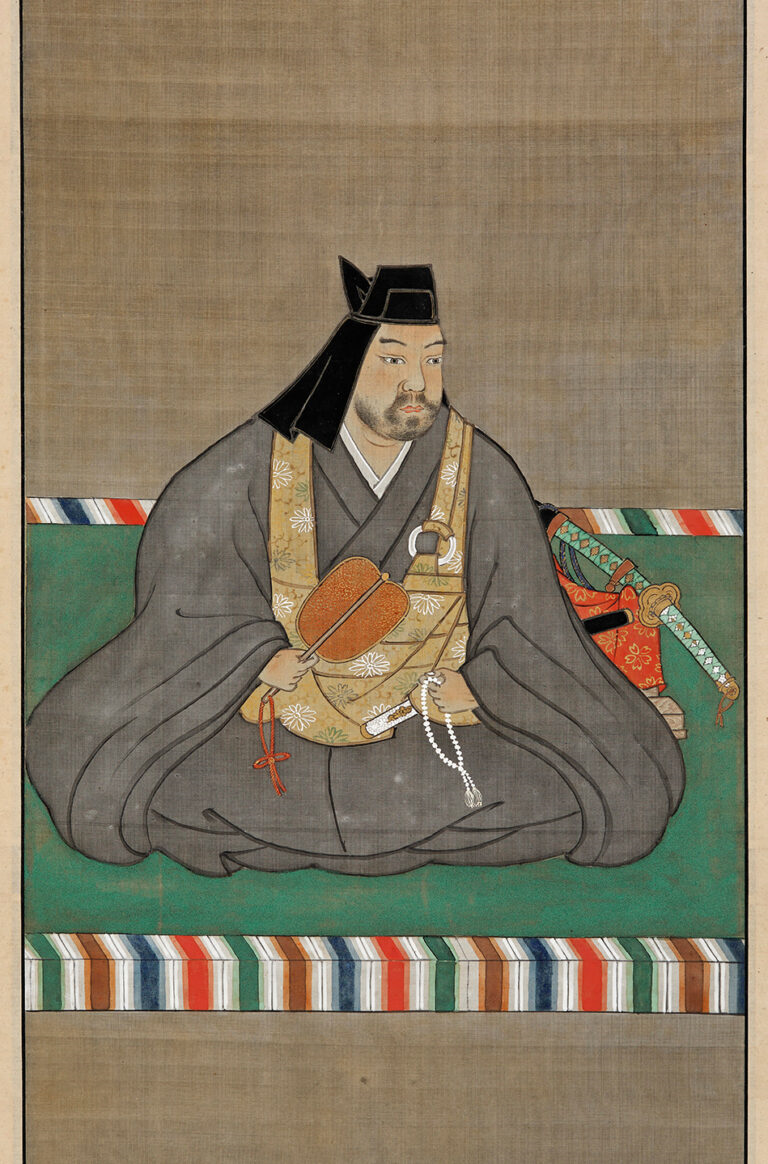

Head of Uesugi clan
- In office 1561–1578
- Preceded by: Uesugi Norimasa
- Succeeded by: Uesugi Kagekatsu

Head of Nagao clan
- In office 1548–1578
- Preceded by: Nagao Harukage
- Succeeded by: Uesugi Kagekatsu

Personal details
- Born: Nagao Kagetora; February 18, 1530 Echigo Province, Japan
- Died: April 19, 1578 (aged 48) Echigo Province, Japan
- Parents: Nagao Tamekage (father); Tora Gozen (mother)
- Relatives: Uesugi Norimasa (adopted father); Nagao Harukage (brother); Aya-Gozen (sister); Nagao Masakage (brother-in-law); Uesugi Kagekatsu (adopted son); Uesugi Kagetora (adopted son)
- Nicknames: "Dragon of Echigo"; "God of War"; "Bishamonten no Keshin"

Military service
- Allegiance: Nagao clan Uesugi clan
- Rank: Lord (Daimyō), Kanrei
- Commands: Kasugayama Castle
- Battles/wars: Siege of Tochio (1544); Battle of Fuse (1553); Battle of Saigawa (1555); Battle of Uenohara (1557); Siege of Odawara (1561); Battle of Kawanakajima (1561); Siege of Karasawa (1563); Battle of Shiozaki (1564); Siege of Matsukura (1568); Battle of Tonegawa (1571); Siege of Kanayama (1574); Siege of Nanao (1576, 1577); Battle of Tedorigawa (1577)

Nagao Kagetora (長尾 景虎; February 18, 1530 – April 19, 1578), later known as Uesugi Kenshin (上杉 謙信), was a Japanese daimyō (magnate). He was born into the Nagao clan, and after adoption into the Uesugi clan, ruled Echigo Province in the Sengoku period of Japan. He was one of the most powerful daimyō of the Sengoku period. Known as the "Dragon of Echigo", while chiefly remembered for his prowess on the battlefield as a military genius and war hero, Kenshin is also regarded as an extremely skillful administrator who fostered the growth of local industries and trade, as his rule saw a marked rise in the standard of living of Echigo.

Kenshin is famed for his honourable conduct, his military expertise, a long-standing rivalry with Takeda Shingen, his numerous defensive campaigns to restore order in the Kantō region as the Kanto Kanrei, and his belief in the Buddhist god of war Bishamonten. Many of his followers and others believed him to be the avatar of Bishamonten and called Kenshin the "God of War".

== Name ==
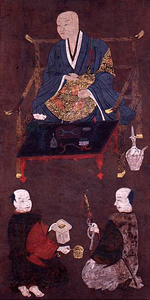
Depiction of Kenshin in a monk-like image with two ministers, from Muromachi period (1336–1573)

His original name was Nagao Kagetora (長尾景虎). He changed his name to Uesugi Masatora (上杉政虎) when he came to lead the Uesugi clan, and in order to accept the official title of Kantō Kanrei (関東管領) he changed his name again to Uesugi Terutora (上杉輝虎) to honor the 13th shōgun Ashikaga Yoshiteru (足利義輝), and finally to Kenshin (上杉謙信) after he vowed to become a Zen-Buddhist. He would become renowned for being a devotee of Bishamonten.

Kenshin was born in the Tiger year (Chinese zodiac) and always kept the word "tora" (虎, tiger) in his names. He is respected as "The Tiger of Echigo" for his intelligence and accomplishments. Kenshin is also referred to as "The Dragon of Echigo" (越後の龍) because of his Kakarimidareryuu (懸かり亂れ龍) ensign displayed on the battlefield.

His rival Takeda Shingen was called "The Tiger of Kai". They fought five times at the various Battles of Kawanakajima. In some versions of Chinese mythology (Shingen and Kenshin had always been interested in Chinese culture, especially the works of Sun Tzu), the Dragon and Tiger have always been bitter rivals who try to defeat one another, but neither is ever able to gain the upper hand. Kenshin and Shingen were also known to harbour a deep respect for the other's military prowess and strategic foresight with Kenshin even going so far as to express grief and weep at news of Shingen's death.

His ceremony of departure to war started with praying at the shrine of Bishamonten, a traditional farewell meal with the generals with three dishes (symbolizing good fortune) and three cups, which also symbolized good luck and onmyōdō's heaven, earth and man. It was followed by two shouts "Ei!" (Glory") and "O!" (Yes!) with the assembled troops, also repeated three times, and the army standard lowered to the generals as a way of respect. In the end, Kenshin re-dedicated to the war god with the "bow of Hachiman", and mounted his horse surrounded by three flag banners; first with the first character of the Bishamonten's name, second with the red rising sun on blue (Emperor's gift), and third, the warring dragon flag.

== Early life and rise ==
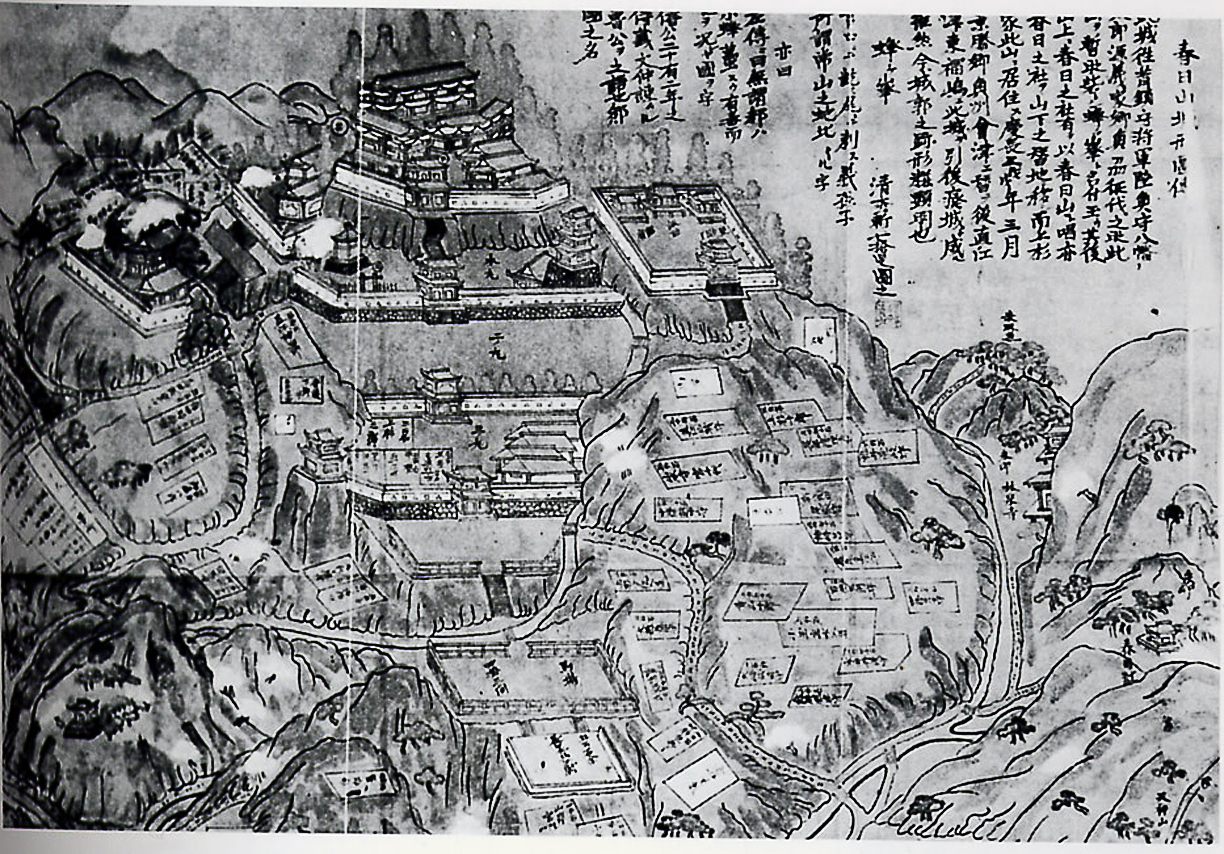
Kasugayama Castle was Kenshin's primary fortress.

Kenshin born as Kagetora, the third or fourth son of the noted warrior Nagao Tamekage (長尾為景). His life presents a unique story – he was not from the Uesugi, but the Nagao clan. His father's family were the retainers of the Yamanouchi branch of the Uesugi clan, and his father had gained some renown with his military victories over his lords Uesugi Akisada, Uesugi Sadanori and Uesugi Funayoshi.

However, in later years, Tamekage found himself at odds with the neighboring Ikkō-ikki of Hokuriku and, as the political power in the region started to shift in favor of the Ikkō-ikki (due largely to the sudden rise of Hongan-ji), the situation for Echigo quickly deteriorated. It came to a peak in 1536, when Kenshin's father gathered up an army and marched westward. However, upon arriving at Sendanno (December 1536) in Etchū, his forces were suddenly attacked by Enami Kazuyori and in the resulting fracas Tamekage himself was slain and his army put to flight.

The impact back at Echigo was immediate. Nagao Harukage, Tamekage's eldest son, immediately made his bid for control of the Nagao and succeeded in this claim after a power struggle which resulted in the death of one of his brothers, Kageyasu. Kenshin was removed from the conflict and relocated to Rinsen-ji temple, where he spent his life from 7 to 14 dedicated to study, martial arts and Zen.

At the age of 14, Kenshin was suddenly contacted by Usami Sadamitsu and a number of other acquaintances of his late father. They urged the young Nagao son to go to Echigo and contest his older brother's rule. It would seem that Harukage had not proven the most effective or inspiring leader (probably due to ill health) and his failure to exert control and gain support of the powerful kokujin families had nearly torn the province apart. As the story is told, at first Kenshin was reluctant to take the field against his own brother, but was eventually convinced that it was necessary to the survival of Echigo.

At the age of 15 he was placed in joint command of Tochio Castle, making a reputation for himself by successfully defending it against the rebels who were plotting against the Uesugi. Kenshin succeeded in wresting control of the Nagao clan from Nagao Harukage in 1548. Nagao Harukage stepped down from the lead of the clan and provincial government and gave the titles to his younger brother. Harukage died five years later in 1553.

At the age of 19 Kenshin became the head of the Nagao clan and entered the Kasugayama Castle, but still as the retainer of the Uesugi clan.

In the year 1551, Kenshin was called upon to provide refuge in his castle for his nominal lord, Uesugi Norimasa, who had been forced to flee there due to the expansion into the Kantō region by the lord Hōjō Ujiyasu from the Hōjō clan. He agreed to give the warlord shelter, under specific terms, but was not in a position at the time to move against the Hōjō. The terms were Norimasa's adoption of Kenshin as his heir, the title Lord of Echigo, and the Kantō Kanrei post as shōgun's deputy. Nagao Kagetora became Uesugi Masatora and continued to gain power as the Governor of Echigo.

In 1552, the Uesugi started to wage war against the Hōjō clan. Though his rule over the Nagao and Uesugi clans were now unquestioned, much of Echigo was still independent of this young warlord's grasp. Kenshin immediately set out to cement his power in the region, but these efforts were still in their infant stages when far more pressing concerns appeared.

In 1553, Ogasawara Nagatoki and Murakami Yoshikiyo, two Shinano lords, both appeared before Kenshin requesting his help in halting the advances of the powerful warlord Takeda Shingen. Around the time Kenshin became the new lord of Echigo, Shingen had won major victories in Shinano Province. With the Takeda's conquests taking them remarkably close to the borders of Echigo, Kenshin agreed to take the field on two fronts, against Hojo and Takeda. However the conflicts between the three lords were more complex, as shown by the various alliances and treaties between them.

In 1561, Masatora took the name of Uesugi Terutora, upon succeeding as head of the Yamanouchi-Uesugi family and assuming the position of Kanto Kanrei. Later, he changed his name again, finally to 'Kenshin' after he became a Buddhist monk.

== Conflict with Takeda ==
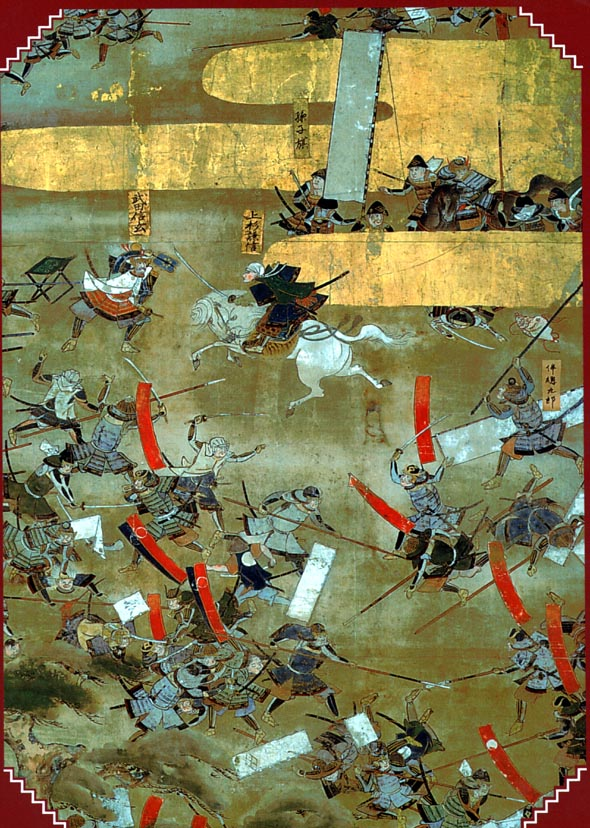
Depiction of the legendary personal conflict between Kenshin and Shingen at the fourth battle of Kawanakajima

What followed after the triple alliance of Kenshin was the beginning of a rivalry which became legendary in the history of Japan and the Sengoku period. Over the years, there would be a total of five such engagements at the famous site of Kawanakajima (1553, 1555, 1557, 1561, 1564). In the first conflict between the two, both Uesugi Kenshin and Takeda Shingen were very cautious, only committing themselves to indecisive skirmishes; only the fourth battle would prove to be a serious all-out battle between the two.

=== Fourth Battle of Kawanakajima ===
In 1561, Kenshin and Shingen fought the biggest battle they would fight, the fourth battle of Kawanakajima. Kenshin used an ingenious tactic: a special formation where the soldiers in the front would switch with their comrades in the rear, as those in the frontline became tired or wounded. This was extremely effective and because of this Kenshin nearly defeated Shingen.

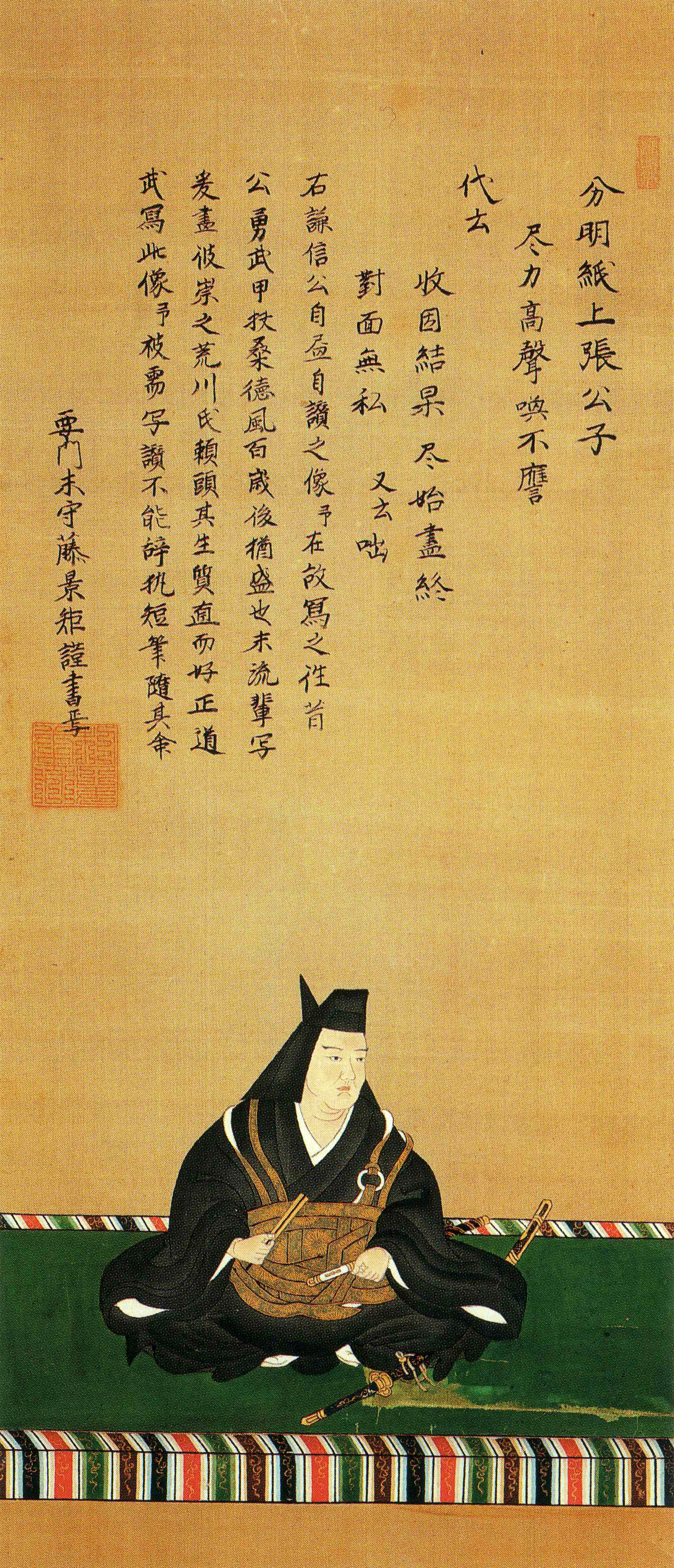
Portrait of Kenshin.

In Kōyō Gunkan there is one of the most famous instances of single combat in samurai history. During this battle, Kenshin managed to ride up to Shingen and slashed at him with his sword. Shingen fended off the blows with his iron war fan or tessen. Kenshin failed to finish Shingen off before a Takeda retainer drove him away.

Shingen made a counter-attack and the Uesugi army retreated. The result of the fourth battle of Kawanakajima is still uncertain: many scholars are divided on who the actual victor was or if the battle was actually decisive enough to even declare one.

It is considered to be the costliest battle in the Sengoku period, with loss of an estimated 72 percent of Kenshin's army and 62 percent of Shingen's army. Some more conservative estimates place the casualties around 20 percent. Shingen also lost two of his most important generals during the battle, his advisor Yamamoto Kansuke and younger brother Takeda Nobushige.

In 1563, Shingen allied with Hōjō Ujiyasu against the Uesugi clan, they captured Matsuyama Castle in Musashi Province. In 1565, Shingen then took Kuragano Castle and Minowa Castle in Kōzuke province. In 1571, Kenshin attacked Shingen's satellite Ishikura Castle in Kōzuke province, and they again faced each other at the Battle of Tonegawa, to once again disengage.

In addition, after Shingen broke with the Hōjō, there was an incident when the Hōjō clan blocked shipment of salt supplies to Kai Province. When Kenshin heard of Shingen's problem, he sent salt to Shingen from his own province. Kenshin commented that the Hōjō had "performed a very mean act". Kenshin added, "I do not fight with salt, but with the sword".

However, there is doubt that Kenshin's act was purely altruistic as it was recorded that he did not merely send salt, but also allowed the merchants of Echigo to sell their salt in Takeda's territory. Kenshin also saw the economic opportunity for merchants under his rule to prosper by going into Shingen's territories.

Kenshin's respect for Shingen is evident from his reaction to Shingen's death: he privately wept and stated, "I have lost my good rival. We won't have a hero like that again!"

== Conflict with Hōjō ==
Though his rivalry with Takeda Shingen was legendary, Uesugi Kenshin actually had a number of other ventures occurring around the times of these famous battles (1553–1564).

In the year 1559, he made a trip with escort of 5,000 men to pay homage to the shōgun in Kyoto. This served to heighten his reputation considerably, and added to his image as a cultured leader as well as a warlord. This same year he was pushed once again by Uesugi Norimasa to take control of the Kantō back from the Hōjō, and in 1560 he was able to comply. In August of the same year, he put southern Echigo under control of a five-man council for broad mobilization, while forming a small investigative council for any kind of unrest.

=== First siege of Odawara ===
Heading a campaign against Hōjō Ujiyasu from fall 1560 to the summer of 1561, Kenshin was successful in taking a number of castles from the clan, including Numata Castle and Umayabashi Castle, which ended with the first siege of Odawara Castle in Sagami Province. He managed to break the defenses and burn the town, but the castle itself remained unconquered due to threats from Shingen, and thus seized Kamakura.

In 1563, Kenshin saved his ally Ōta Sukemasa, who was under siege by both Hōjō Ujiyasu and Takeda Shingen. In November 1569, when Shingen sieged Odawara Castle, Ujiyasu requested help from Kenshin.

In 1566, after the Yura clan of Kozuke Province changed their allegiance to the Hōjō clan. Later in 1574, Kenshin ordered the Satake clan to attack Yura clan Kanayama Castle, and participated in the siege himself, but Kanayama Castle withstood the attack.

== Uesugi expansion ==
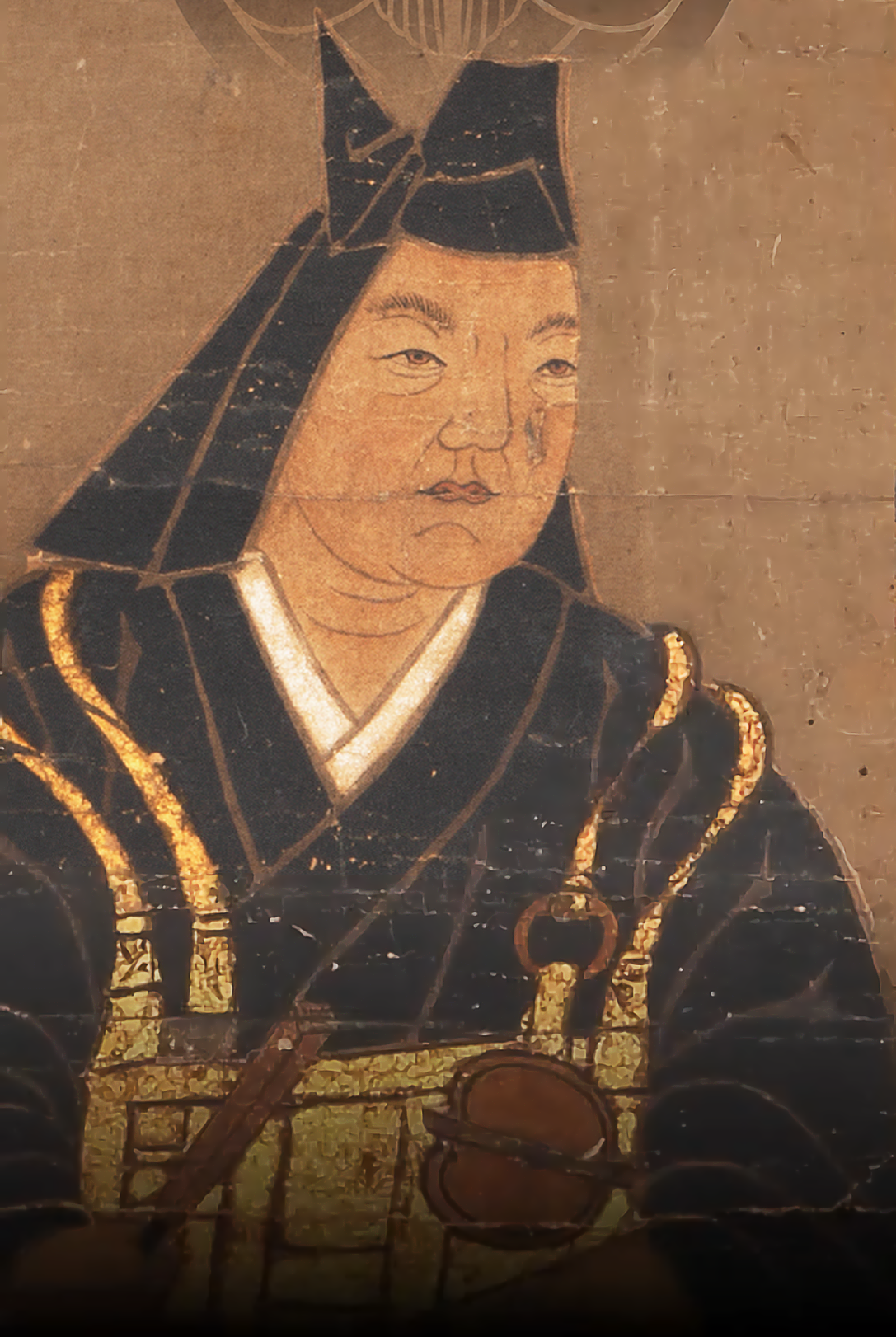
Uesugi Kenshin portrait close-up Rinsenji Temple

In 1563, Kenshin occupied Sano Domain of Kōzuke Province. He besieged Karasawa Castle against Sano Masatsune and made strong inroads into the region, forcing many of the smaller warlords to submit to him. By 1564 Kenshin controlled Echizen Province and Kōzuke Province.

In June 12 of the same year, Kenshin entered into an alliance with Hōjō Ujiyasu and Oda Nobunaga. Later, in same month, Shingen asked shogun Yoshiaki Ashikaga and Nobunaga to mediate a peace agreement with Kenshin, which Nobunaga responded to by asking Kenshin for a peace agreement with Shingen, in a meeting which is called the Koetsu Peace Agreement. However, in March of the next year, Kenshin broke off the negotiations with Shingen and instead reaffirmed his alliance with Hōjō clan.

Meanwhile, Tokugawa Ieyasu, who was an ally of the Hōjō clan, also sought an alliance with Kenshin by sending an envoy to the Uesugi clan. In response, Kenshin sent a reply dated August 22 to the Tokugawa clan's senior vassal, Sakai Tadatsugu, and Matsudaira Masanori (son of Yoshinori, 1546-1582), a member of the Matsudaira clan. In the reply, he indicated his intention to come to an agreement.

From this point, concrete alliance negotiations began and on October 8, Ieyasu issued a pledge to Kenshin and also broke his relationship with the Takeda clan. As Ieyasu formed an alliance with Kenshin, he swore to break off relations with Shingen and arranged to have the proposed marriage between relatives of Nobunaga and Shingen to be called off.

The other main area which interested Uesugi Kenshin was Etchū Province in the west; Kenshin would spend nearly half his life involved in the politics of that province. The land was inhabited by two feuding clans, the Jinbō and the Shiina. Kenshin first entered the dispute as a mediator in the early 1560s between rivals Shiina Yasutane and Jinbō Nagamoto, but he later sided with the Shiina and took over the Jinbo clan. Decades later, Kenshin turned against the Shiina clan, taking their main castle in 1570 and having Shiina Yasutane assassinated in 1576 by Kojima Motoshige.

By the 1570s, after Kenshin took Toyama Castle and Matsukura Castle, Kenshin governed Echigo Province, controlled Kōzuke Province, Etchū Province and some adjacent provinces, all Hokuriku seaboard, and routed Oda Nobunaga's forces in Echizen Province.

== Conflict with Oda ==
In 1568, when Oda Nobunaga installed Ashikaga Yoshiaki as the shōgun, Kenshin praised Nobunaga. Their good relationship continued for a while, but in 1573, when Nobunaga deposed Yoshiaki, their relationship became delicate. Under the protection of the Mōri clan, Yoshiaki began frequently requesting Uesugi, Takeda, and Hōjō to join forces and overthrow Nobunaga. Kenshin broke his alliance with Nobunaga.

Through the mediation of Yoshiaki, he reconciled with Kennyo, formed an alliance, and became a member of the forces opposed to Nobunaga. When the death of Hatakeyama Yoshitaka, a lord in Noto Province, sparked confusion and conflict, Kenshin was quick to use the opportunity, taking land from the weakened clan and successfully besieging Nanao Castle, which put him in a position to threaten Nobunaga and his allies. In response, Nobunaga pulled together his own forces and those of his two best generals, Shibata Katsuie and Maeda Toshiie, to meet Kenshin at the Battle of Tedorigawa (1577) in Kaga Province.

=== Battle of Tedorigawa ===
Kenshin based his 30,000 strong army at the castle of Matsuto, while Oda Nobunaga's forces arrived with 50,000 troops led by many famous generals. Despite Nobunaga's superior numbers, Kenshin managed to score a solid victory on the field. At first, Kenshin anticipated that Nobunaga would try to move by night over the river for dawn attack and thus refused to engage the Nobunaga army. Then he pretended to send forth a small unit to attack Nobunaga's main force from behind and gave his enemy a great opportunity to crush his remaining force. Nobunaga took the bait. Nobunaga's force attacked at night expecting a weakened opponent at the front; instead Kenshin's full military might was waiting. Having lost 1,000 men in combat and then more as the Oda troops attempted to escape across the Tedori River, Nobunaga ordered a retreat into Ōmi Province.

Kenshin, who described the opponent's performance as "surprisingly weak", had a false impression to have defeated Nobunaga, as the Oda army was actually led by Shibata Katsuie. Eventually in 1577, Kenshin secured and controlled the Noto and Kaga Province from the Oda clan.

== Death ==
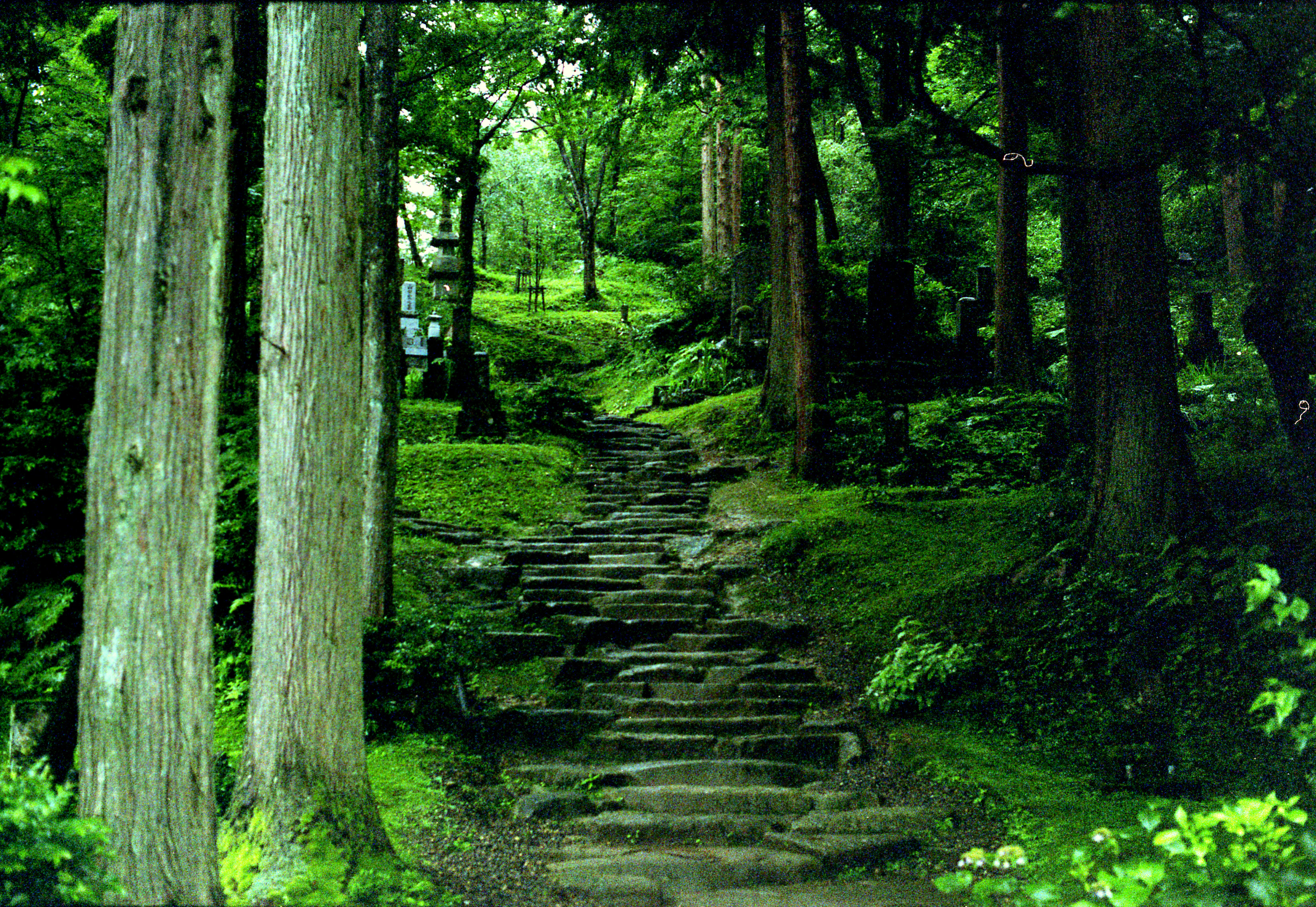
Uesugi Kenshin's grave at the Rinsen-ji temple, Jōetsu, Niigata

In October 1577, Uesugi Kenshin arranged to put forth a grand army to continue his assaults into Nobunaga's territory. In 1578, he entered an alliance with Takeda Katsuyori against Nobunaga, but was held up by bad weather and died of esophageal cancer in the spring of 1578. His death poem was:

四十九年 一睡夢 一期栄華 一盃酒

—

which is rendered in English as:

Even a life-long prosperity is but one cup of sake;
A life of forty-nine years is passed in a dream;

—

in English versions the poem then includes the additional proceeding lines:

I know not what life is, nor death.
Year in year out-all but a dream.
Both Heaven and Hell are left behind;
I stand in the moonlit dawn,
Free from clouds of attachment.

The cause of Kenshin's death has been questioned throughout the years. The theory accepted by most scholars is the record of his deteriorating health by early sources, such as his complaints of pain in the chest "like an iron ball", and as Kenshin Gunki (1582) records "on the 9th day of the 3rd month he had a stomach ache in his toilet. This unfortunately persisted until the 13th day when he died". However, it is also speculated that he was victim of one of the most famous ninja assassinations by a ninja concealed in the cesspool beneath the latrine at Kenshin's camp with a short spear or sword. The theories are not mutually exclusive — the assassin, if he existed, might simply have fatally wounded an already dying man. However, as his anticipation of his own death is recorded in the death poem, the possibility of assassination appears less likely.

Domestically, Kenshin left behind a succession crisis. While he never had any children of his own, Kenshin adopted two boys during his lifetime. His nephew, Uesugi Kagekatsu, was probably adopted to avoid antagonizing Kagekatsu's father, Nagao Masakage, and his relatives and supporters. Another adopted son, Uesugi Kagetora, who was originally the son of Hōjō Ujiyasu, was adopted to secure Echigo's borders. Some suppose that Kagekatsu was intended to be gradually set up as his heir, while others believe that Kenshin decided to divide the estates between the two.

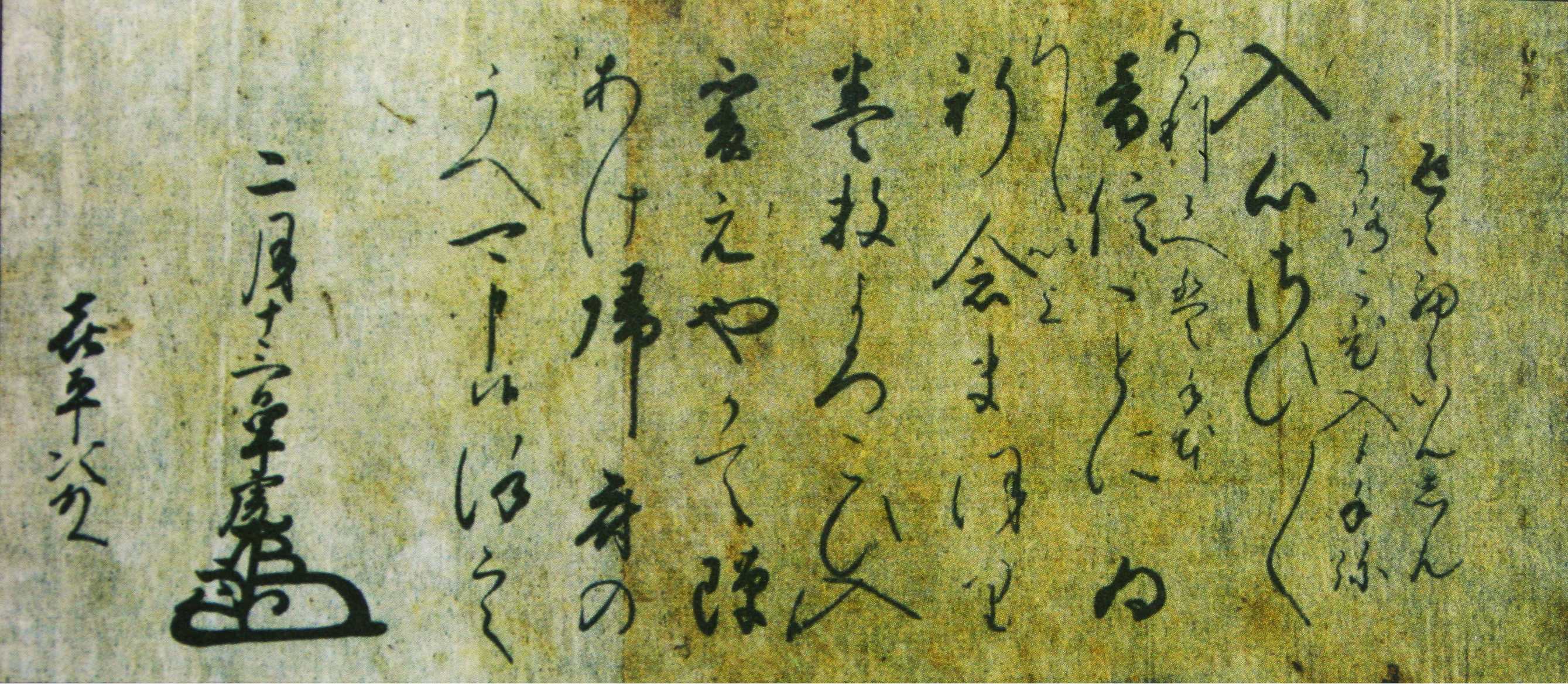
Letter from Uesugi Kenshin to Uesugi Kagekatsu

Both sons had external blood ties, and reasonable claims. Kagetora was besieged at Otate in 1578, and although contacted for aid Hōjō Ujimasa and Takeda Katsuyori, the former backed down. Kagekatsu married Takeda's sister, and eventually was able to secure his succession. Kagetora fled to a castle near the Echigo-Shinano border, where he committed suicide in 1579.

The death caused local power struggles, with the result being almost decade-long infighting in Echigo between 1578 and 1587, usually divided into the "Otate Disturbance" (1578–1582) and the "Shibata rebellion" (1582–1587). The resistance of Kagetora's supporters continued for a few years in north-central Echigo. In 1582, Shibata Shigeie, who was a vassal of Kagekatsu, led a rebellion in north Echigo, probably due to low rewards for his support of Kagekatsu, but even more due to Kagekatsu's granting control over the toll barriers in the port of Niigata to Takemata Yoshitsuna.

However, in the aftermath of the costly internal struggle, the Oda clan exploited rebellions against Kagekatsu to advance right up to the border of Echigo, having captured Noto and Kaga while the Uesugi brothers were busy with infighting. This, combined with the destruction of the Takeda clan, Uesugi's then-ally and long-time Oda enemy, would come close to destroying the Uesugi clan before Oda Nobunaga's own death once again shattered the balance of power in Japan.

== Legacy ==
Kenshin is said to have been undefeated in over 50 open battles, hence being dubbed the "God of War" by his followers. Kenshin's military success is related to his successful reform efforts on trade, market, transportation network (taxing mechanism in the port towns), and revenues generated by the cloth trade. The result was control over commerce which the previous government did not have. He also established feudal ties with the warrior population by land grants. The so-called Funai Statutes show the provisions that apply to the traditional elites and common folk, tax breaks due to war exhaustion, with intent to centralize and consolidate the lands around his capital, which were followed by further reforms for the consolidation of the imperial lands prior the 1560–1562 Kantō campaign. However, despite Kenshin's control over agriculture and the economy, he did not thoroughly implement key reforms such as cadastral surveys, important for military obligations, implying Kenshin's focus on commerce. The management of the administration and military organization, as well as leadership in some minor battles in Echigo Funai were handed by vassal Kurata Gorōzaemon.

== Kenshin festivals ==
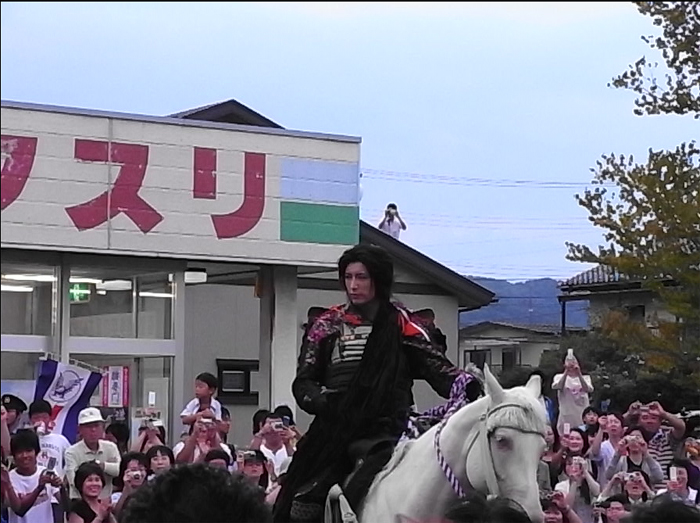
Gackt as Kenshin at the Kenshin Festival in Jōetsu, Niigata, 2008

The Kenshin Festival 謙信公祭 (Kenshin Kousai) has taken place every August in Jōetsu since 1926. The procession starts at Kasugayama Castle for the reenactment of the fourth Kawanakajima battle, with an army of 400–1,000 soldiers. Japanese singer-songwriter Gackt portrayed Kenshin on several occasions since 2007 and, thanks to his participation, the festival in 2015 reached record high attendance of 243,000 people.

The Echigo Kenshin Sake Festival is held every October and reaches attendance of roughly 100,000 visitors.

== In popular culture ==
Kenshin is the main protagonist of Chōgorō Kaionji's epic historical novel Ten to Chi to ("Heaven and Earth") and NHK taiga drama adaptation Ten to Chi to (1969) in which he was played by Kōji Ishizaka. Kenshin, played by Isao Natsuyagi, is featured in the 1979 film G.I. Samurai, and is played by Eiichi Kanakubo as a minor character in Akira Kurosawa's 1980 jidaigeki Kagemusha.

The 1990 movie adaptation of Kaionji's novel, Heaven and Earth directed by Haruki Kadokawa, in which Kenshin is portrayed by Takaaki Enoki, covers the rivalry between Uesugi Kenshin and Takeda Shingen, focusing mainly on the character of Kenshin, who is referred to by his original name Kagetora. The film has been praised for its realistic depictions of warfare and battles of the period. Being a box office success in Japan, it is also famous for holding the world record for most saddled horses used in one sequence, employing 800 horses in a battle segment. Kaionji's novel was also adapted by TV Asahi for its 50th anniversary as a 2008 TV drama special in which Kenshin was played by Masahiro Matsuoka.

In the 2007 NHK taiga drama, Fūrin Kazan, Uesugi Kenshin is portrayed by Japanese singer-songwriter Gackt. Gackt recalls that Kenshin was always portrayed as a very tough man, but wanted to play him with the female myth in the mind, which presented him clean-shaven and with long hair. Although the show received some harsh criticisms, co-actor Ken Ogata expressed his approval of Gackt's work; the audience demanded the increase of his role in the series.

The 2009 NHK Taiga drama Tenchijin partly re-tells the story of Uesugi Kenshin, played by Hiroshi Abe, although its main focus is on Naoe Kanetsugu, the page and later advisor to Uesugi Kenshin's adopted son and heir Kagekatsu.

Kenshin was again voiced by Gackt in the anime of the gag manga, Tono to Issho (2010–2011). The live-action drama Sengoku Basara: Moonlight Party cast actress Mayuko Arisue as Kenshin. Gackt participated in the production, but voiced Oda Nobunaga. In Cobra Kai, Season 5 episode 2, Terry Silver shows Chozen a samurai sword that he purchased at an auction, telling Chozen that it was used by Kenshin in the fourth battle of Kawanakajima.

The manga Yukibana no Tora by Akiko Higashimura, serialised in Shogakukan's seinen manga magazine Hibana from March 2015 to August 2017, also portrays its main protagonist Kenshin as a woman. Tomeo Yagiri's theory, known as the Female Uesugi Kenshin Theory, served as the basis for the portrayal of female versions of Kenshin in popular culture. Yagiri proposed that Kenshin was a woman, inspiring various adaptations and interpretations in media. Various fictional works have used the femininity theory, portraying Kenshin as female or featuring gender-neutral interpretations.

Kenshin has been featured in many video games, such as Koei's Samurai Warriors and Warriors Orochi and Capcom's Sengoku Basara series. He is a playable character in Pokémon Conquest (Pokémon + Nobunaga's Ambition in Japan), where he is the warlord of Illusio with his partner Pokémon being Gallade and Mewtwo. Kenshin also appears in a gender bender parallel universe anime series Battle Girls: Time Paradox. A female Kenshin, as Nagao Kagetora, also appears in the mobile game Fate/Grand Order, voiced by actress and singer Nana Mizuki. Similarly appearing as a female character, Kenshin is found in the mobile game The Battle Cats as an Uber Super Rare in the Sengoku Wargods Vajiras banner and the Rance series, most notably in Sengoku Rance.

Kenshin was portrayed by Japanese figure skater and two-time Olympic champion Yuzuru Hanyu in his Olympic free skate program Heaven and Earth (天と地と), using the soundtrack of the two taiga dramas Ten to Chi to and Shin Heike Monogatari. Hanyu's motivation behind the music choice was his strong resonance with Kenshin's situation as well as his values and approach towards battle. The program was debuted in December 2020 at Big Hat arena in Nagano, near the historical location of the fourth Battle of Kawanakajima in 1961. It earned Hanyu two of his six titles at the Japan Figure Skating Championships, tying Takeshi Honda's record of most national titles in 50 years.

== Quotes ==
Fate is in heaven, armor is on the chest, accomplishment is in the feet; always fight with your opponent in the palm of your hand, and you won't get wounded. If you fight willing to die, you'll survive; if you fight trying to survive, you'll die. If you think you'll never go home again, you will; if you hope to make it back, you won't. While it is not incorrect to consider the world uncertain, as a warrior one should not think of it as uncertain but as totally certain.

== Gallery ==
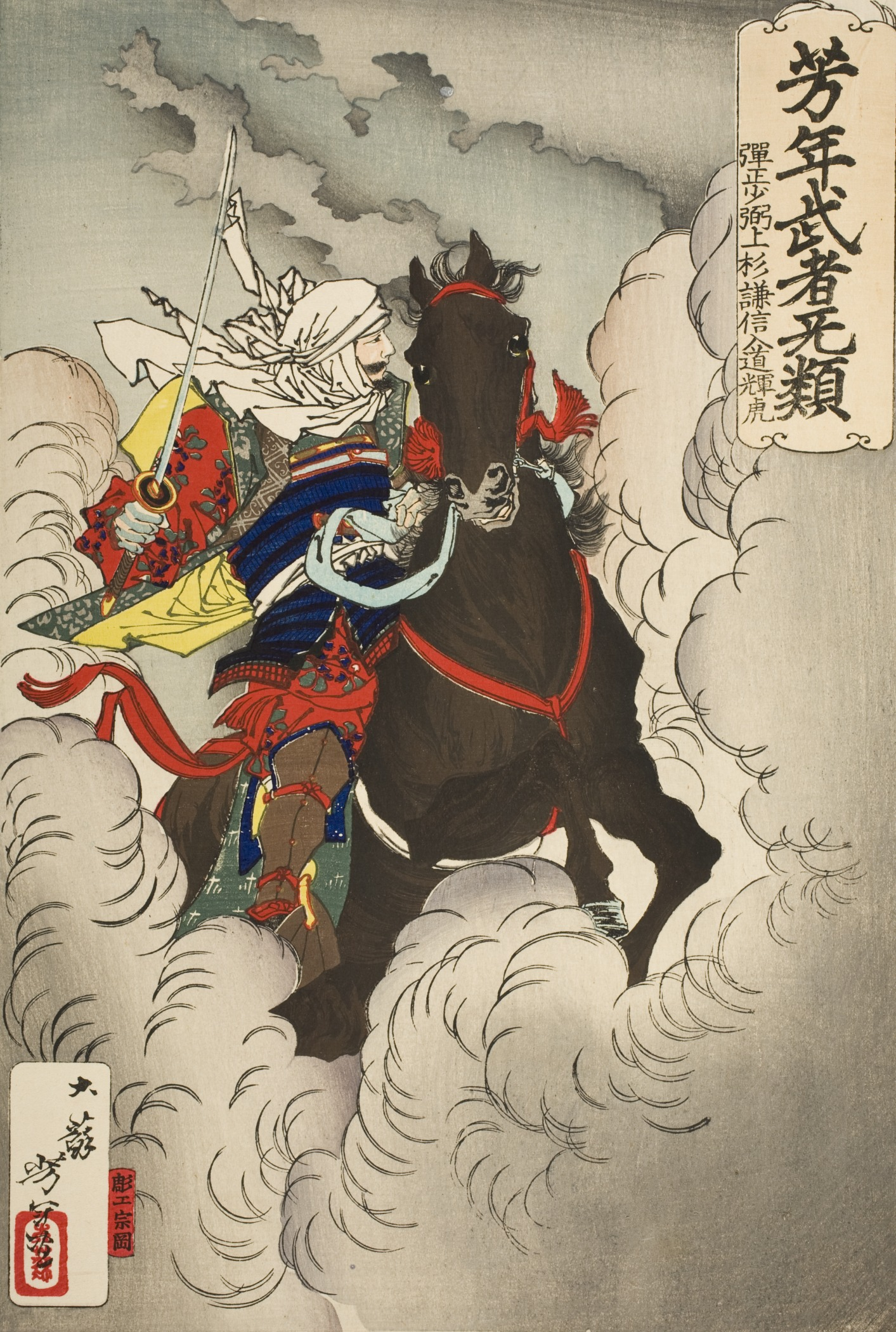
Kenshin's mythical riding into battle by Tsukioka Yoshitoshi (1883)

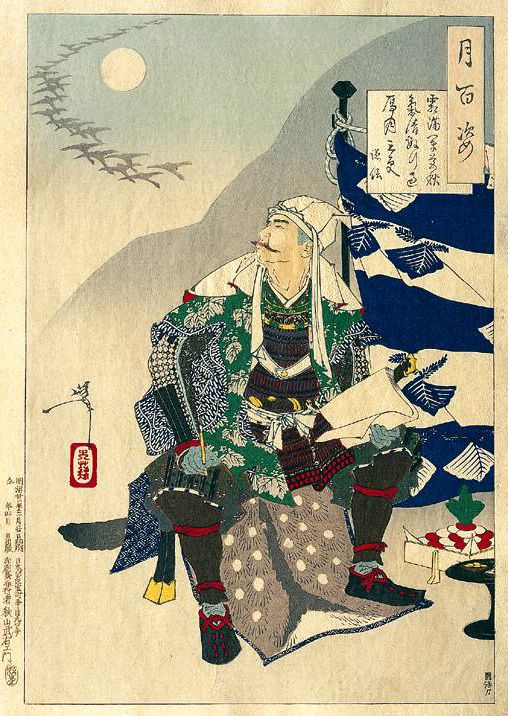
Kenshin writing his death poem, by Yoshitoshi (1839–1892)

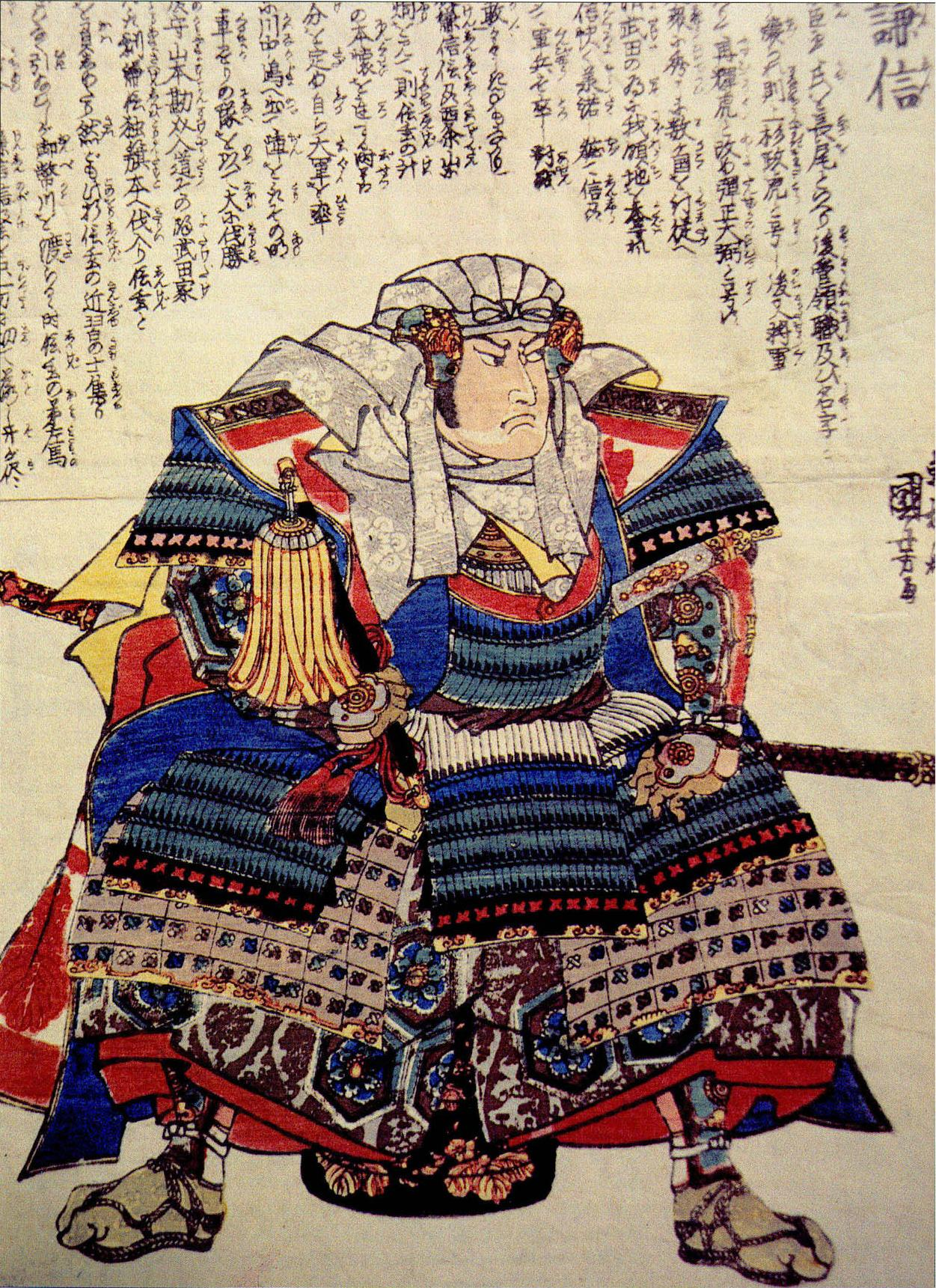
Kenshin depicted by Utagawa Kuniyoshi (1843–1844)

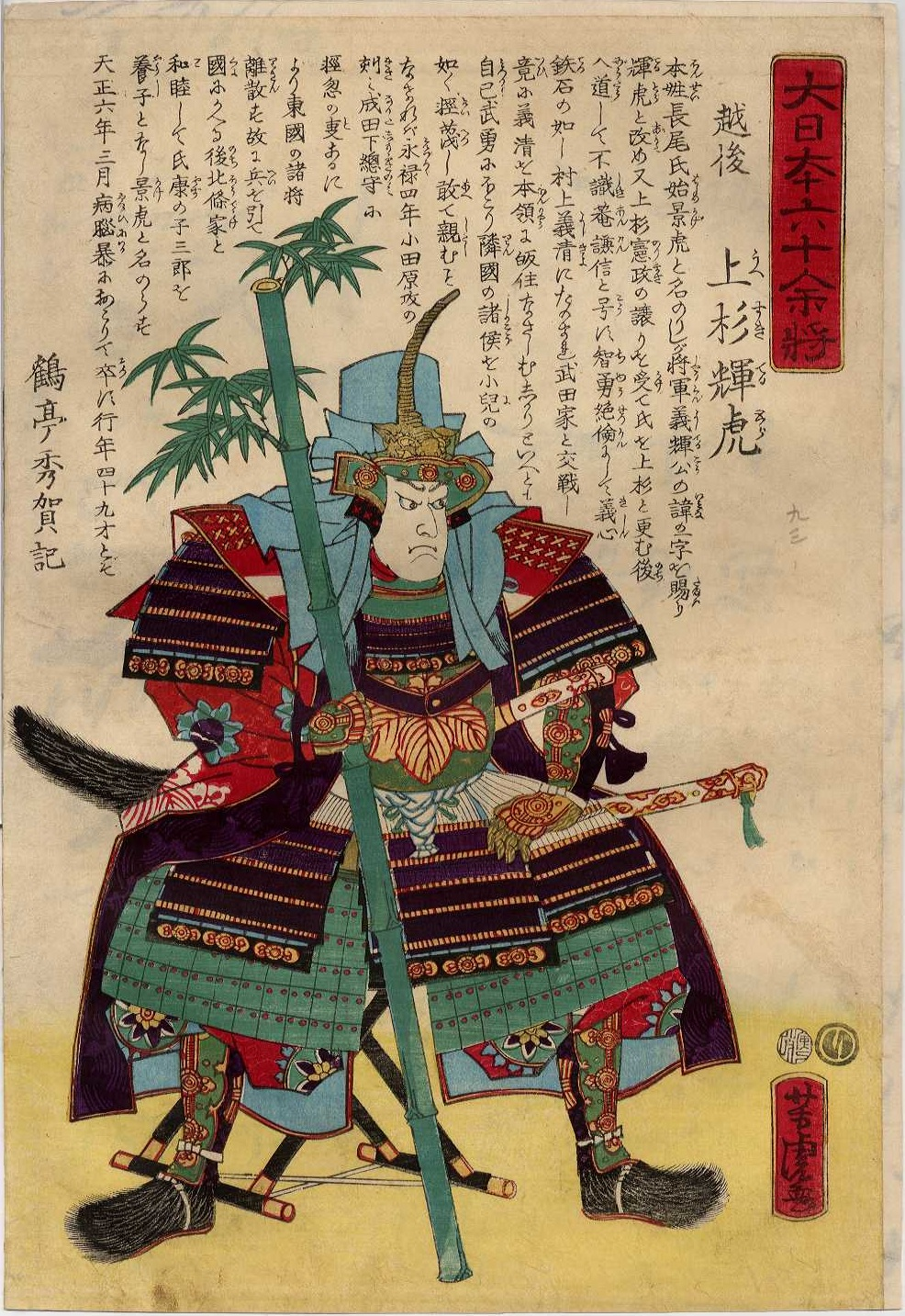
Kenshin depicted by Utagawa Yoshitora (1866)

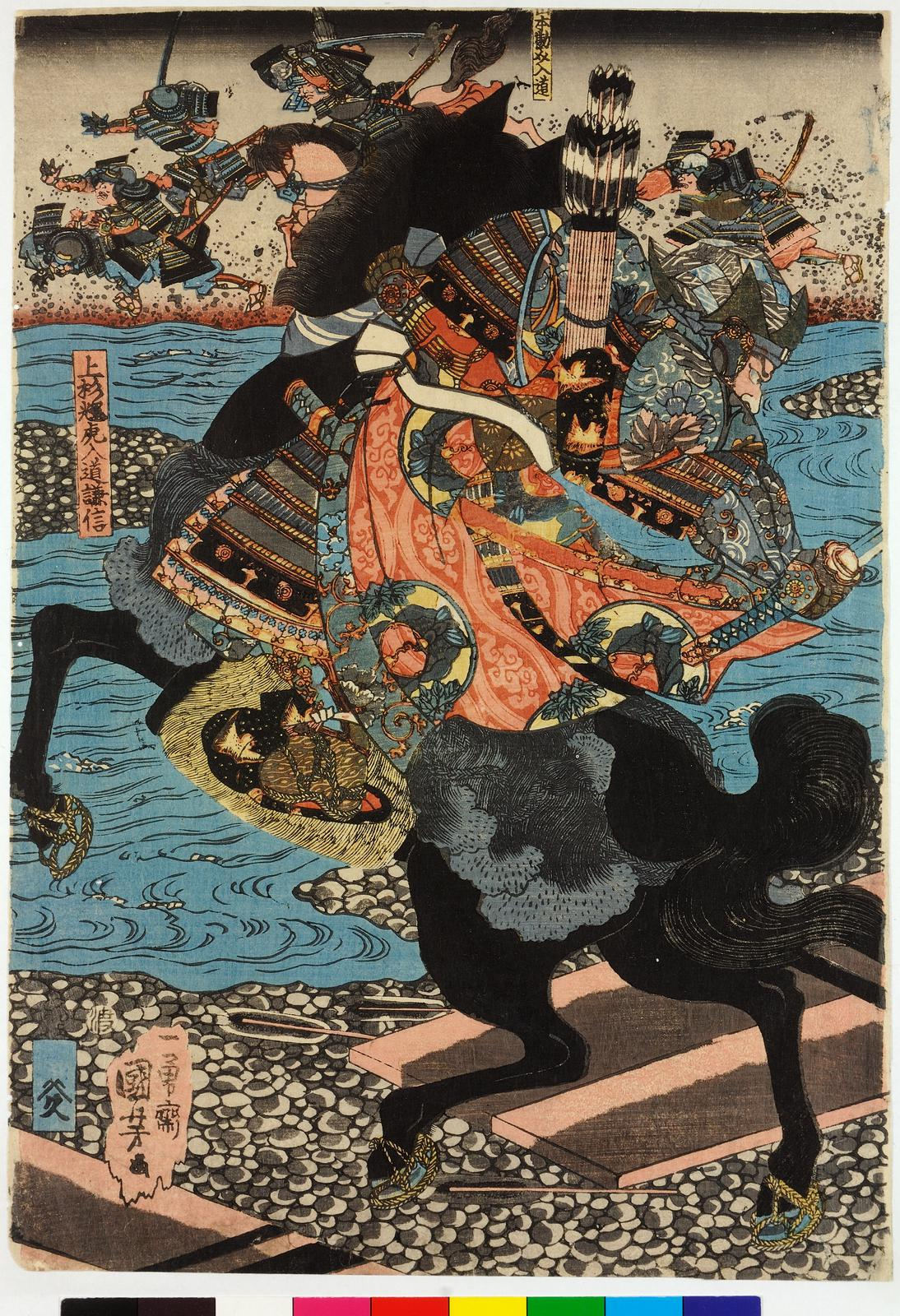
Kenshin depicted by Utagawa Kuniyoshi (1845)

== Honours ==
- Junior Second Rank (September 9, 1908; posthumous)

== See also ==
- Female Uesugi Kenshin theory
- Naoe Kanetsugu
- Aya-Gozen

| Preceded by Uesugi Norimasa | Uesugi family head 1548–1578 | Succeeded by Uesugi Kagekatsu |
