= Nagao clan =

Japanese clan

Nagao 長尾
- The emblem (mon) of the Nagao clan
- Home province: Sagami province
- Parent house: Taira clan
- Titles: Various
- Founder: Nagao Kagehiro
- Ruled until: 16th century (merged with Uesugi clan)
- Cadet branches: Uesugi clan (clan merger)

Nagao clan (長尾氏, Nagao-shi) was a Japanese samurai clan.

== History ==
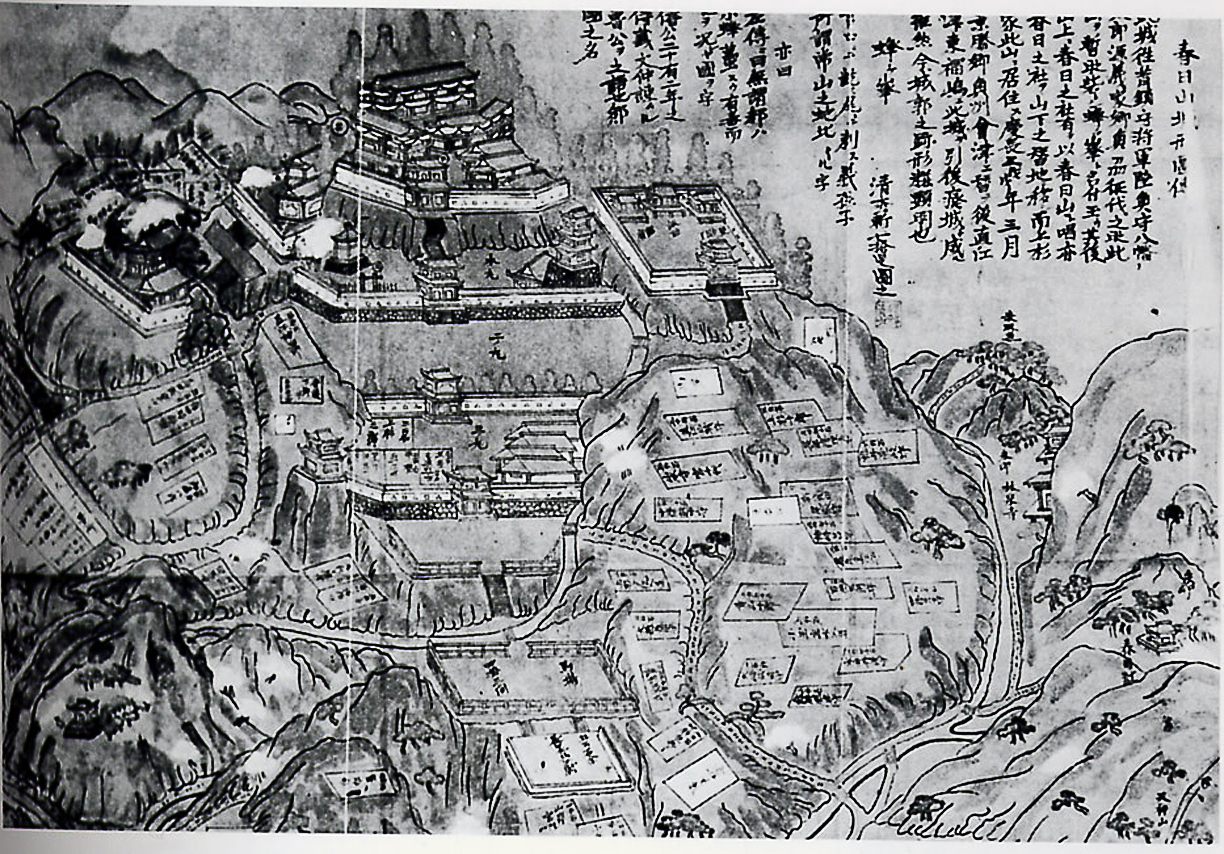
Kasugayama castle

The Nagao clan descend from military lord Taira no Yoshifumi, of the Kammu Heishi (Taira clan), and from the Emperor Kammu (735–806), the 50th Emperor of Japan.

They are one of the 'Bando Hachi Heishi', the 'eight Taira clans of Kanto region' (the Chiba, Miura, Nagao, Kazusa, Doi, Chichibu, Oba, and Kajiwara clans, respectively).

The family name of Nagao began when Kagehiro, settled at Nagao no sho estate, in Sagami Province, and took the name of the place. The Nagao were the Kasai (Head retainers) of the Uesugi clan, and were the Shugodai (vice-Governors) of Echigo, Kozuke, and Musashi provinces.

The Kamakura Nagao branch, was called the Kamakura Nagao because they lived in Kamakura. This branch of the clan were the lords of Kanno castle. A junior member of the Kamakura Nagao, Nagao Masanaga settled in the Koshigeyama area, and became lord of Tatebayashi castle.

The Shirai Nagao branch were Shugodai (vice-Governors) of Kozuke and Musashi provinces and lords of Aomi, Hachigata and Shirai castles.

The Echigo Nagao branch were Shugodai of Echigo province. This branch of the clan built and controlled Kasugayama Castle and the surrounding fief, in what is now Niigata Prefecture. Nagao Kagetora, adopted by Uesugi Norimasa, became lord of Kasugayama castle in 1548, taking the name Uesugi Kenshin and effectively becoming the head of the Uesugi clan.

== Nagao family members of note ==
- Nagao Tamekage (d. 1536), was the father of Nagao Kagetora (Uesugi Kenshin) and Aya-Gozen.
- Nagao Harukage (1509-1553), Uesugi Kenshin's older brother, and successor to his father Nagao Tamekage in 1536.
- Uesugi Kenshin (1530-1578), originally Nagao Kagetora, is one of the most famous warlords in Japanese history.
- Aya-Gozen (1524–1609), half-sister of Uesugi Kenshin and mother of Uesugi Kagekatsu.
- Nagao Fujikage (dates unknown) fought under Kenshin at the fourth battle of Kawanakajima in 1561.
- Lady Shirai (d. 1565) was a retainer of Ashikaga Yoshiteru.
- Seien-in (1556 – 1578), daughter of Aya-gozen and wife of Uesugi Kagetora.
