= List of Japanese battles =

The following is a list of Japanese battles, organised by date.

== Ancient/Classical Japan ==
=== Jōmon Period ===
- Jimmu's Eastern Expedition (c. 7th century BCE)

=== Yayoi Period ===
- Takehaniyasuhiko Rebellion (c. 1st century BCE) ja:武埴安彦命
- Expedition of Yamato Takeru (c. late 1st century-early 2nd century) ja:ヤマトタケル
- Civil war of Wa (2nd century AD)
- Expedition of Empress Jingū (c. 3rd century) ja:三韓征伐

=== Kofun period ===
- Goguryeo–Yamato War (391–404)
- Kibi Clan Rebellion (463)
  - Prince Hoshikawa Rebellion (479)
- Iwai Rebellion (527–528)
- Musashi no Kuni no Miyatsuko Rebellion (534) ja:武蔵国造の乱

=== Asuka period ===
- Battle of Shigisan (587)
- Isshi Incident (645)
- North expedition of Abe no Hirafu (658–660) ja:阿倍比羅夫
- Battle of Baekgang (663)
- Jinshin War (672)

=== Nara Period ===
- Hayato Rebellion (720–721)
- Fujiwara no Hirotsugu Rebellion (740)
- Fujiwara no Nakamaro Rebellion (764)
- Thirty-Eight Year War (774–811)
  - Hōki Rebellion (780–781?) ja:宝亀の乱
  - Battle of Subuse (788) ja:巣伏の戦い

=== Heian Period ===
- Thirty-Eight Year War (774–811)
  - Conquest by Sakanoue no Tamuramaro (801)
  - Last Conquest by Funya no Watamaro (811)
- Gangyō Rebellion (878) ja:元慶の乱
- Kanbyō Silla pirate invasion (893) ja:新羅の入寇
- Jōhei-Tengyō Rebellion (936–941) ja:承平天慶の乱
- Fujiwara no Koresuke Rebellion (947) ja:藤原是助の乱
- Toi invasion (1019)
- Taira no Tadatsune Rebellion (1028–1030) ja:平忠常の乱
- Zenkunen War (1051–1062)
  - Battle of Onikiribe (1051)
  - Battle of Kinomi (1057)
  - Siege of Komatsu (1062)
  - Siege of Koromogawa (1062)
  - Siege of Kuriyagawa (1062)
- Enkyū Battle of Ezo (1070) ja:延久蝦夷合戦
- Gosannen War (1083–1087)
  - Siege of Kanezawa (1087)
- Minamoto no Yoshichika Rebellion (1107–1108) ja:源義親の乱
- Hōgen Rebellion (1156)
- Heiji Rebellion (1160)

==== Genpei War (1179–1185) ====
- Battle of Ishibashiyama (1180)
- Battle of Fujigawa (1180)
- Battle of Sunomata-gawa (1181)
- Battle of Kurikara (1183)
- Siege of Hōjūjidono (1184)
- Battle of Uji (1184)
- Battle of Awazu (1184)
- Battle of Ichi-no-Tani (1184)
- Battle of Kojima (1184)
- Battle of Yashima (1185)
- Battle of Dan-no-ura (1185)

== Feudal Japan to Early Modern Japan ==
=== Kamakura period ===
- Battle of Ōshū (1189)
- Kennin Rebellion (1201)
- Hatakeyama Shigetada Rebellion(1205)ja:畠山忠重の乱
- Wada Rebellion (1213) ja:和田合戦
- Miura Rebellion (1247) ja:宝治合戦
- Jōkyū War (1221)
  - Battle of Uji (1221)
- February Incident(1272) ja:二月騒動

==== Mongol Invasions of Japan (1274 & 1281) ====
- Battle of Bun'ei (1274)
- Battle of Kōan (1281)

==== Genkō War (1331–1333) ====
- Siege of Kasagi(1331)
- Siege of Akasaka (1331)
- Siege of Chihaya (1333)
- Battle of Bubaigawara (1333)
- Siege of Kamakura (1333)

=== Muromachi period ===
- Nakasendai Rebellion (1335) ja:中先代の乱
- Civil war of the Kenmu Restoration (1335–1336)

==== Nanboku-chō period (1336–1392) ====
- Battle of Tatarahama (1336)
- Battle of Minatogawa (1336)
- Siege of Kanegasaki (1337)
- Battle of Ishizu (1338) ja:石津の戦い
- Battle of Shijō Nawate (1348)
- Kannō Incident (1350–1352) ja:観応の擾乱
  - Battle of Uchidehama (1351) ja:打出浜の戦い
- Battle of Chikugogawa (1359) ja:筑後川の戦い
- Ōei Rebellion (1399) ja:応永の乱
- Rebellion of Uesugi Zenshū (1416–1417) ja:上杉禅秀の乱
- Eikyō Rebellion (1438–1439) ja:永享の乱
- Yūki War (1440–1441)
  - Siege of Yūki (1440) ja:結城合戦
- Kakitsu Incident (1441) ja:嘉吉の乱

=== Sengoku period ===
==== Kyōtoku Incident (1454–1482) ====
- Battle of Bubaigawara (1455) ja:分倍河原の戦い(室町時代)
- Koshamain's Revolt (1456–1457) ja:コシャマインの戦い
- Battle of Irako (1459–1477) ja:五十子の戦い
- Nagao Kageharu Rebellion (1476–1480) ja:長尾景春の乱
  - Battle of Egota-Numabukurohara (1477) ja:江古田・沼袋原の戦い
- Ōnin War (1467–1477)
  - Battle of Goryō (1467) ja:御霊合戦
  - Battle of Higashi Iwakura (1467) ja:東岩倉の戦い
  - Battle of Shokokuji (1467) ja:相国寺の戦い
  - Battle of Kamigyo (1467) ja:上京の戦い
  - Battle of Ichijo Omiya (1467)
- Yamashiro Rebellion (1485–1493)
- Kaga Rebellion (1487–1488)
- Chōkyō Incident (1487–1505) ja:長享の乱
  - Battle of Tachigawara (1504) ja:立河原の戦い
- Battle of Kuzuryūgawa (1506)
- Battle of Nyoigatake (1509) ja:如意ケ嶽の戦い
- Battle of Nagamorihara (1510) ja:長森原の戦い
- Siege of Gongenyama (1510)
- Siege of Arai (1516)
- Battle of Arita-Nakaide (1517) ja:有田中井手の戦い
- Battle of Iidagawara (1521)
- Ningbo Turmoil (1523) ja:寧波の乱
- Siege of Edo (1524)
- Siege of Kamakura (1526)
- Battle of Nashinokidaira (1526)
- Battle of Katsuragawa (1527) ja:桂川原の戦い
- Battle of Ozawahara (1530)
- Battle of Tatenawate (1530) ja:田手畷の戦い
- Battle of Shiokawa no gawara (1531)
- Kyoroku War (1531) ja:享禄の錯乱
- Battle of Daimotsu (1531) ja:大物崩れ
- Tenbun War (1532–1535) ja:天文の錯乱
  - Siege of Iimoriyama (1532) ja:飯盛山城の戦い
  - Siege of Sakai (1532)
  - Siege of Yamashina Honganji (1532) ja:山科本願寺の戦い
- Battle of Idano (1535)
- Battle of Un no Kuchi (1536)
- Battle of Sanbuichigahara (1536)
- Hanakura Incident (1536) ja:花倉の乱
- Battle of Sendanno (1536)
- Siege of Musashi-Matsuyama (1537)
- Battle of Kōnodai (1538)
- Battle of Ichiki Tsurumaru Castle (1539)
- Siege of Yoshida-Kōriyama Castle (1540–1541)
- Battle of Sezawa (1542)
- Siege of Uehara (1542)
- Siege of Kuwabara (1542)
- Siege of Fukuyo (1542)
- Battle of Ankokuji (1542)
- First Battle of Azukizaka (1542)
- Siege of Toda Castle (1542–1543)
- Utsuro Rebellion (1542–1548) ja:天文の乱(洞の乱)
- Siege of Tochio (1544)
- Siege of Takatō (1545)
- Battle of Kawagoe (1546)
- Battle of Odaihara (1546)
- Siege of Shika Castle (1546–1547)
- Battle of Kanōguchi (1547)
- Second Battle of Azukizaka (1548)
- Battle of Uedahara (1548)
- Battle of Shiojiritoge (1548)
- Siege of Kajiki (1549)
- Siege of Toishi (1550) ja:砥石崩れ
- Tainei-ji incident (1551)
- Battle of Kiyosu Castle (1552)
- Siege of Katsurao (1553)
- First Battle of Kawanakajima (1553)
- Siege of Kannomine (1554)
- Siege of Matsuo (1554)
- Battle of Enshu-Omori (1554)
- Siege of Iwatsurugi Castle (1554)
- Battle of Muraki Castle (1554)
- Second Battle of Kawanakajima (1555)
- Battle of Ino (1555)
- Battle of Miyajima (1555)
- Battle of Nagaragawa (1556)
- Siege of Katsurayama (1557)
- Third Battle of Kawanakajima (1557)
- Battle of Ukino (1558)
- Siege of Terabe (1558)
- Siege of Marune (1560)
- Battle of Okehazama (1560)
- Battle of Tonomoto (1560)
- Battle of Norada (1560)
- Battle of Moribe (1561)
- First Siege of Odawara (1561)
- Fourth Battle of Kawanakajima (1561)
- Siege of Moji (1561)
- Battle of Kyōkōji (1562)
- Siege of Kaminogō Castle (1562)
- Siege of Musashi-Matsuyama (1563)
- Battle of Batogahara (1564)
- Battle of Kōnodai (1564)
- Fifth Battle of Kawanakajima (1564)
- Battle of Fukuda Bay (1565)
- Siege of Minowa (1566)
- Siege of Inabayama Castle (1567)

==== Azuchi–Momoyama period ====
- Battle of Torisaka (1568)
- Siege of Hachigata (1568)
- Siege of Tachibana (1569)
- Battle of Tatarahama (1569)
- Second Siege of Odawara (1569)
- Battle of Mimasetoge (1569)
- Siege of Kakegawa (1569)
- Siege of Kanbara (1569)
- Battle of Nunobeyama (1570)
- Battle of Takehiro (1571)
- Siege of Fukazawa (1571)
- Battle of Tonegawa (1571)
- Siege of Futamata (1572)
- Battle of Kizaki (1572)
- Siege of Noda Castle (1573)
- First Siege of Takatenjin (1574)
- Siege of Yoshida Castle (1575)
- Siege of Takabaru (1576)
- Siege of Nanao (1577)
- Siege of Otate (1578)
- Battle of Mimigawa (1578)
- Battle of Mimaomote (1579)
- Battle of Omosu (1580)
- Battle of Nakatomigawa (1582)
- Battle of Okitanawate (1584)
- Siege of Iwaya Castle (1586)
- Battle of Hitotoribashi (1586)
- Battle of Koriyama (1588)
- Siege of Kurokawa Castle (1589)
- Battle of Suriagehara (1589)

==== Unification by Oda Nobunaga ====
  - Siege of Kanegasaki (1570)
  - Siege of Chōkō-ji (1570)
  - Battle of Anegawa (1570)
  - Ishiyama Hongan-ji War (1570–1580)
  - Siege of Mount Hiei (1571)
  - Sieges of Nagashima (1571, 1573, 1574)
  - Siege of Iwamura Castle (1572)
  - Battle of Mikatagahara (1573)
  - Siege of Odani Castle (1573)
  - Siege of Ichijōdani Castle (1573)
  - Battle of Nagashino (1575)
  - Battles of Kizugawaguchi (1576, 1578)
  - Siege of Kuroi Castle (1577)
  - Siege of Shigisan (1577)
  - Battle of Tedorigawa (1577)
  - Siege of Kōzuki Castle (1578)
  - Siege of Miki (1578–1580)
  - Siege of Yakami (1579)
  - Siege of Itami (1579)
  - Tenshō Iga War (1579, 1581)
  - Siege of Hijiyama (1581)
  - Second Siege of Takatenjin (1581)
  - Siege of Tottori (1581)
  - Battle of Tenmokuzan (1582)
  - Siege of Takatō (1582)
  - Siege of Takamatsu (1582)
  - Siege of Uozu (1582)
  - Honnō-ji Incident (1582)
  - Battle of Kanagawa (1582)

==== Unification by Toyotomi Hideyoshi ====
  - Battle of Yamazaki (1582)
  - Battle of Shizugatake (1583)
  - Battle of Hiketa (1583)
  - Battle of Komaki and Nagakute (1584)
  - Siege of Kanie (1584)
  - Siege of Suemori (1584)
  - Siege of Negoro-ji (1585)
  - Siege of Ōta Castle (1585)
  - Siege of Toyama (1585)
  - Shikoku campaign (1585)
  - Kyūshū campaign (1586–1587)
  - Siege of Shimoda (1590)
  - Siege of Hachigata (1590)
  - Siege of Odawara (1590)
  - Siege of Oshi (1590)
  - Kunohe Rebellion (1591)
- Hideyoshi's invasions of Korea (1592–1598)
  - Battle of Bunroku (1592–1593)
  - Battle of Keicho (1597–1598)

==== Unification by Tokugawa Ieyasu ====
  - Siege of Shiroishi (1600)
  - Siege of Hataya (1600)
  - Siege of Kaminoyama (1600)
  - Siege of Hasedō (1600)
  - Siege of Matsukawa (1600)
  - Siege of Tanabe (1600)
  - Battle of Gifu Castle (1600)
  - Siege of Fushimi (1600)
  - Battle of Asai (1600)
  - Siege of Annotsu (1600)
  - Siege of Ueda (1600)
  - Siege of Ōtsu (1600)
  - Battle of Ishigakibara (1600)
  - Battle of Kuisegawa (1600)
  - Battle of Sekigahara (1600)
  - Siege of Udo (1600)
  - Siege of Yanagawa (1600)
  - Siege of Sawayama (1600)
  - Siege of Minakuchi (1600)

=== Edo period ===
- Battle of Matsukawa (1601)
- Rokugō Rebellion (1603)
- Red Seal ship incident (1608 or 1609)
- Invasion of Ryukyu (1609)
- Nossa Senhora da Graça incident (1610)
- Siege of Osaka (1614–1615)
  - Winter Campaign (大坂冬の陣 Osaka Fuyu no Jin)
    - Battle of Imafuku (1614)
    - Battle of Shigino (1614)
    - Battle of Kizugawa (1614)
    - Battle of Noda-Fukushima (1614)
    - Siege of Sanada-maru (1615)
  - Summer Campaign (大坂夏の陣 Osaka Natsu no Jin)
    - Battle of Kashii (1615)
    - Battle of Dōmyōji (1615)
    - Battle of Yao (1615)
    - Battle of Wakae (1615)
    - Battle of Tennoji (1615)
- Japanese invasion of Taiwan (1616) (1616–1617)
- Shimabara Rebellion (1637–1638)
- Shakushain's Revolt (1669–1672)
- Jōkyō Uprising (1686)
- Ueda Rebellion (1761) ja:上田騒動
- Nijinomatsubara Rebellion (1771) ja:虹の松原一揆
- Menashi-Kunashir Rebellion (1789)
- Ōshio Heihachirō's Rebellion (1837)
- Tsushima Incident (1862)
- Battle of Shimonoseki Straits (1863)
- Battles for Shimonoseki (1863)
- Bombardment of Kagoshima (1863)
- Mito Rebellion (1864)
- Kinmon Incident (1864)
- First Chōshū expedition (1864)
- Battles for Shimonoseki (1864)
- Second Chōshū expedition (1866)

==== Boshin War (1868–1869) ====
- Battle of Toba–Fushimi (1868)
- Battle of Awa (1868)
- Battle of Kōshū-Katsunuma (1868)
- Battle of Utsunomiya Castle (1868)
- Battle of Ueno (1868)
- Battle of Aizu (1868)
- Battle of Miyako Bay (1869)
- Battle of Hakodate (1869)
- Naval Battle of Hakodate (1869)

== Modern period ==
=== Meiji period ===
- Saga Rebellion (1874)
- Japanese invasion of Taiwan (1874)
- Ganghwa Island incident (1875)
- Shinpūren Rebellion (1876)
- Akizuki Rebellion (1876)
- Hagi Rebellion (1876)
- Satsuma Rebellion (1877)
  - Siege of Kumamoto Castle (1877)
  - Battle of Tabaruzaka (1877)
  - Battle of Shiroyama (1877)
- Donghak Peasant Revolution (1894–1895)
  - Battle of Ugeumchi (1894)

==== First Sino-Japanese War (1894–1895) ====
- Battle of Pungdo (1894)
- Battle of Seonghwan (1894)
- Battle of Pyongyang (1894)
- Battle of Yalu River (1894)
- Battle of Jiuliancheng (1894)
- Battle of Lushunkou (1894)
- Battle of Weihaiwei (1895)
- Battle of Yingkou (1895)
- Japanese invasion of Taiwan (1895)
  - Pescadores Campaign (1895)
  - Battle of Keelung (1895) (1895)
  - Hsinchu Campaign (1895)
  - Battle of Baguashan (1895)
  - Battle of Chiayi (1895)
  - Battle of Chiatung (1895)
  - Capitulation of Tainan (1895)
  - Battle of Changhsing (1895)

==== Boxer Rebellion (1899–1901) ====
- Battle of the Taku Forts (1900)
- Seymour Expedition (1900)
- Battle of Langfang (1900)
- Battle of Tientsin (1900)
- Siege of the International Legations (1900)
- Battle of Beicang (1900)
- Gaselee Expedition (1900)
- Battle of Peking (1900)
- Battle of Yangcun (1900)

==== Russo-Japanese War (1904–1905) ====
- Battle of Port Arthur (1904–1905)
- Battle of Chemulpo Bay (1904)
- Battle of Yalu River (1904)
- Battle of Te-li-Ssu (1904)
- Battle of Motien Pass (1904)
- Battle of Tashihchiao (1904)
- Siege of Port Arthur (1904-1905)
- Battle of Hsimucheng (1904)
- Battle of the Yellow Sea (1904)
- Battle off Ulsan (1904)
- Battle of Korsakov (1904)
- Battle of Nanshan (1904)
- Battle of Shantung (1904)
- Battle of Dairen (1904)
- Battle of Liaoyang (1904)
- Battle of Shaho (1904)
- Battle of Sandepu (1905)
- Battle of Tsushima (1905)
- Battle of Mukden (1905)

==== Japan–Korea Treaty of 1907 (1907) ====
- Namdaemun Battle (1907)

=== Taisho Period ===
==== World War I (1914–1918) ====
- Siege of Tsingtao (1914)
- Allied occupation of German New Guinea (1914)
- Japanese occupation of German colonial possessions (1914)

==== Korean independence movement ====
- Battle of Samdunja
- Battle of Fengwudong (Battle of Bong-o-dong)
- Hunchun incident
- Battle of Qingshanli (Battle of Cheongsanri)
- Free City Incident
- Battle of Pochonbo (1937)

=== Showa Period ===
==== Second Sino-Japanese War (1931–1945) ====
- 1931 — Mukden Incident
- 1931–32 — Japanese invasion of Manchuria
- 1931 — Jiangqiao Campaign
- 1931 — Battle for Nenjiang Bridge
- 1931–1942 — Pacification of Manchukuo
- 1931–1932 — Jinzhou Operation
- 1932 — Battle of Harbin
- 1932 — First Battle of Shanghai
- 1932 — Attack on Pingdingshan
- 1932 — Attack on Fushun
- 1933 — Battle of the Great Wall
- 1933 — Battle of Rehe
- 1933–1936 — Southern Mongolian campaign (1933–36)
- 1936 — Suiyuan Campaign
- 1937 — Battle of Pochonbo
- 1937 — Lugou Bridge Incident
- 1937 — Battle of Beiping–Tianjin
- 1937–1945 — Aerial engagements of the Second Sino-Japanese War
- 1937 — Operation Chahar
- 1937 — Second Battle of Shanghai
- 1937 — Peiking–Suiyuan Railway Operation
- 1937 — Beiping–Hankou Railway Operation
- 1937 — Tianjin–Pukou Railway Operation
- 1937 — Battle of Taiyuan
- 1937 — Battle of Pingxingguan
- 1937 — Battle of Sihang Warehouse
- 1937 — Battle of Xinkou
- 1937 — Battle of Nanking
- 1938 — Battle of Taierzhuang
- 1938 — Battle of Xuzhou
- 1938 — Battle of Northern and Eastern Henan
- 1938 — Battle of Lanfeng
- 1938 — Amoy Operation
- 1938 — Taihoku Air Strike
- 1938 — Bombing of Chongqing
- 1938 — Battle of Wuhan
- 1938 — Battle of Xinfeng
- 1938 — Battle of Wanjialing
- 1938 — Canton Operation
- 1939 — Hainan Island Operation
- 1939 — Battle of Nanchang
- 1939 — Battle of Suixian–Zaoyang
- 1939 — Swatow Operation
- 1939 — First Battle of Changsha
- 1939–1940 — Battle of South Guangxi
- 1939–1940 — Battle of Kunlun Pass
- 1940 — Battle of West Suiyuan
- 1940 — Battle of Wuyuan
- 1940 — Battle of Zaoyang–Yichang
- 1940 — Hundred Regiments Offensive
- 1940 — Central Hubei Operation
- 1941 — New Fourth Army incident
- 1941 — Western Hubei Operation
- 1941 — Battle of South Henan
- 1941 — Battle of Shanggao
- 1941 — Battle of South Shanxi
- 1941 — Second Battle of Changsha
- 1941 — December 1941 Chinese Nationalist guerrilla warfare
- 1941 — Battle of Hong Kong
- 1941 — Bombing of Singapore
- 1941–1942 — Third Battle of Changsha
- 1942–1945 — South-East Asian theatre of World War II
- 1942 — 1942 Bombing of Vietnam
- 1942 — Malayan campaign
- 1942 — Battle of Singapore
- 1942 — Battle of Sarimbun Beach
- 1942 — Battle of Kranji
- 1942 — Battle of Bukit Timah
- 1942–1945 — Burma campaign (1942–1945)
- 1942 — Japanese invasion of Burma
- 1942 — Battle of the Yunnan–Burma Road
- 1942 — Battle of Tachiao
- 1942 — Battle of Oktwin
- 1942 — Battle of Toungoo
- 1942 — Battle of Yenangyaung
- 1942 — Combined Japanese-Thai invasion of the Shan States
- 1942 — Thai invasion of the Kayah State
- 1942 — Burma campaign (1942–1943)
- 1942 — Zhejiang-Jiangxi campaign
- 1942 — Battle of the Dwarf Mountain
- 1943 — Operation North of the Yangtze
- 1943 — Battle of Guangzhouwan
- 1943 — Battle of West Hubei
- 1943 — Weinan Campaign
- 1943 — Linnan Campaign
- 1943–1945 — Battle of Northern Burma and Western Yunnan
- 1943 — Battle of Changde
- 1943 — 1943 Bombing of Vietnam
- 1943 — 1943 Bombing of Taiwan
- 1944–1945 — Bombing of South-East Asia (1944–1945)
- 1944 — Burma campaign (1944)
- 1944 — Operation Ichi-Go
- 1944 — Battle of Central Henan
- 1944 — Siege of Myitkyina
- 1944 — Fourth Battle of Changsha
- 1944 — Battle of Mogaung
- 1944 — Battle of Mount Song
- 1944 — Battle of Hengyang
- 1944 — Battle of Guilin–Liuzhou
- 1944–1945 — Burma campaign (1944–1945)
- 1945 — Battle of West Henan–North Hubei
- 1945 — Battle of West Hunan
- 1945 — 1945 Guangxi campaign

==== Soviet–Japanese border conflicts (1932-1939) ====
- Battle of Khalkhyn Temple (1935)
- Tauran Incident (1936)
- Kanchazu Island incident (1936)
- Battle of Lake Khasan (1938)
- Battles of Khalkhin Gol (1939)

==== Invasion of French Indochina (1940) ====
- 1940 Cochinchina uprising (1940)

==== World War II ====
1941

- Attack on Pearl Harbor
- Japanese invasion of The Philippines
- Japanese invasion of Thailand
- Battle of Malaya
- Battle of Hong Kong
- Battle of Guam
- Battle of Wake Island
- Battle of Singapore
- Battle of Borneo
- Battle of Kampar

1942

- Battle of Bataan
- Battle of Manado
- Battle of Tarakan
- Battle of Balikpapan
- Battle of Ambon
- Marshalls-Gilberts raids
- Battle of Makassar Strait
- Invasion of Sumatra
- Battle of Palembang
- Battle of Badung Strait
- Battle of Timor
- Battle of the Java Sea
- Battle of the Coral Sea
- Battle of Corregidor
- Battle of Midway
- Battle of the Eastern Solomons
- Battle of Savo Island
- Battle of Milne Bay
- Battle of Tassafaronga
- Battle of the Santa Cruz Islands
- Battle of Guadalcanal (7 August 1942 – 9 February 1943)

1943

- Battle of the Bismarck Sea (2–4 March)
- Battle of the Komandorski Islands (27 March)
- Battle of Bairoko (20 July)
- Battle of Empress Augusta Bay (1–2 November)
- Battle of Tarawa (20 November – 23 November)

1944

- Battle of Imphal (March – July)
- Battle of the Philippine Sea (19–20 June)
- Battle of Saipan (15 June – 9 July)
- Battle of Guam (21 July — 10 August)
- Battle of Peleliu (September – November)
- Battle of Leyte Gulf (23–26 October)
- Battle of Leyte (17 October – 31 December)

1945

- Battle of Iwo Jima (19 February – 26 March)
- Battle of Okinawa (April – June)
- Operation Ten-Go (April)
- Soviet–Japanese War
- Soviet invasion of Manchuria (9 August – 2 September)
- Seishin Operation
- Soviet invasion of South Sakhalin
- Invasion of the Kuril Islands

=== Heisei Period ===
- Battle of Amami-Ōshima (2001)

== See also ==
- Military history of Japan
- Battles of the Imperial Japanese Navy
