= Katsurayama =

Katsurayama is a Japanese name

Katsurayama may also refer to:

== People ==
- Shingo Katsurayama, a Japanese actor
- Katsurayama Ujimoto, a samurai during the Sengoku period

== Places or events ==
- Siege of Katsurayama, an event during the Sengoku period
- Katsurayama Castle, a Japanese castle
