= Hōjō Tsunashige =

- 北条 綱成

Lord of Tamanawa Castle
- In office 1542–1587
- Preceded by: Hōjō Tamemasa
- Succeeded by: Hōjō Ujishige

Personal details
- Born: Katsuchiyo; 1515
- Died: June 11, 1587 (aged 71–72) Tamanawa Castle, Kanagawa prefecture, Japan
- Relations: Hōjō Tamemasa (step father); Hōjō Ujitsuna (father in law); Hōjō Ujiyasu (brother in law)
- Parent: Kushima Masashige (father)
- Nickname: "Jio Hachiman"

Military service
- Allegiance: Later Hōjō clan
- Rank: Commander
- Commands: Tamanawa Castle; Kawagoe Castle; Fukazawa Castle
- Battles/wars: Siege of Musashi-Matsuyama (1537); Battle of Kōnodai (1538); Siege of Kawagoe Castle (1545); Siege of Hirai Castle (1551); Siege of Odawara (1561); Battle of Kōnodai (1564); Battle of Numajiri (1567); Siege of Fukazawa (1571)

Hōjō Tsunashige (北条 綱成; 1515 – June 11, 1587) or Hōjō Tsunanari also known as "Jio Hachiman", was a samurai commander with great skill under the Hōjō clan. The brother in law of Hōjō Ujiyasu. Around the Kantō region, he fought in many battles supporting the Hōjō, also contributing to the expansion of the domain of Hōjō, he was well known for his fighting skill and also an excellent diplomat.

== Biography ==
Tsunashige's childhood name was 'Katsuchiyo'. His father was Kushima Masashige, a vassal of the Imagawa clan. Tsunashige was the stepson of Hōjō Ujiyasu's brother, Tamemasa, and son-in-law of Hōjō Ujitsuna. He was fought for Hōjō from 1537 and known as 'Jio Hachiman' (God of warriors with yellow flags) for his soldiers yellow uniforms, along with outstandingly creative banners. Tsunashige was the castellan (castle lord) in command of Tamanawa Castle and Kawagoe Castle.

In 1545, during the Siege of Kawagoe Castle, despite an overwhelming attacking force, numbering around 85,000, the 3,000 men Kawagoe Castle's garrison under Hōjō Tsunashige, held off the siege until the Hojo Ujiyasu relief force arrived. He attained fame by defeating the siege.

In 1551, he fought in Siege of Hirai castle against Uesugi Norimasa.

In 1561, he fought in the first Siege of Odawara against Uesugi Kenshin.

In 1564, he fought in the second Battle of Konodai against Satomi Yoshihiro.

In 1567, he fought in Battle of Numajiri against Satake Yoshishige.

In 1571, Fukazawa Castle that Tsunashige defended was surrounded by Takeda Shingen's large army. Tsunashige held off well but was forced to surrender. Then, he withdrew to his Tamanawa Castle.

After the Siege of Fukazawa Castle, Tsunashige retired from public life, and he died in 1587. Tsunashige's tomb is at Ryūhō-ji Temple near the Tamanawa castle.

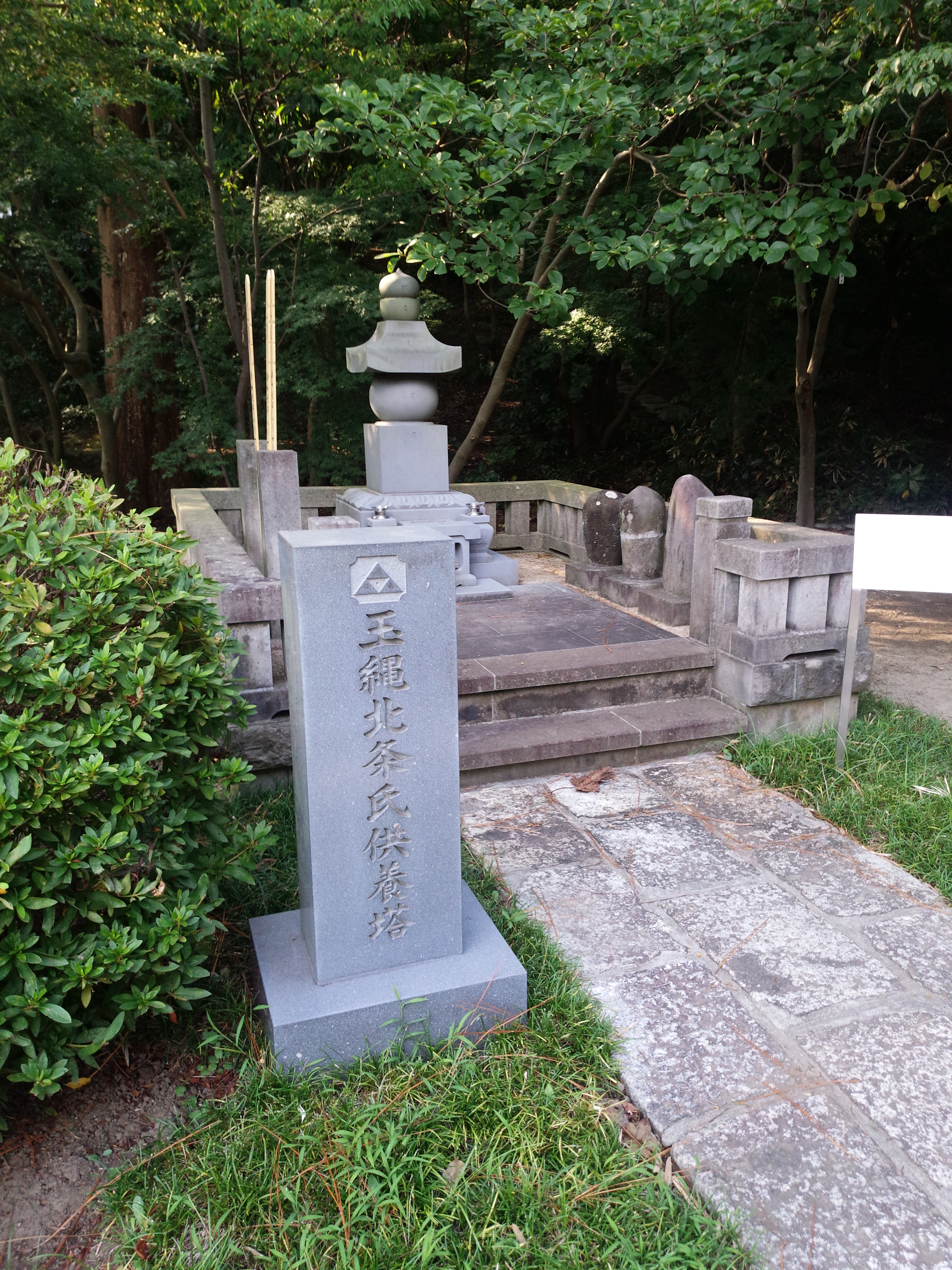
Hōjō Tsunashige and Tamanawa Hōjō clan's tomb
