= Battle of Kōnodai =

Battle of Kōnodai may refer to:

- Battle of Kōnodai (1538)
- Battle of Kōnodai (1564)
