= Battle of Tatarahama =

Battle of Tatarahama may refer to one of two major battles fought at the site Tatarahama, just outside Hakata, Fukuoka, Japan:

- Battle of Tatarahama (1336), one of many battles part of the Nanboku-chō Wars.
- Battle of Tatarahama (1569), one of the struggles between the Ōtomo and Mōri samurai clans during Japan's Sengoku period.
