= Siege of Musashi-Matsuyama =

Siege of Musashi-Matsuyama may refer to:

- Siege of Musashi-Matsuyama (1537)
- Siege of Musashi-Matsuyama (1563)
