= Kizugawa (disambiguation) =

Kizugawa may refer to:

- Kizugawa, Kyoto, a city in Japan
- Kizu River in Kyoto and Mie prefectures of Japan
- Kizugawa Maru, a WWII-era Japanese ship scuttled at Guam
- Kizugawa Station in Osaka, Japan
- Battle of Kizugawa in 1614
- Battles of Kizugawaguchi in 1576 and 1578
