= Siege of Fukazawa =

1571 siege

- Part of Sengoku period
Date	1571
Location	Fukazawa Castle, Suruga province 35°19′27″N 138°57′23″E
Result	Takeda victory

Belligerents
Hōjō clan castle garrison	Forces of Takeda Shingen

Commanders and leaders
Hōjō Tsunashige; Matsuda Norihide	Takeda Shingen
- Location within Shizuoka Prefecture Siege of Fukazawa (Japan)

The 1571 siege of Fukazawa castle was one of a number of battles which formed Takeda Shingen's campaigns against the Hōjō clan, during Japan's Sengoku period.

== History ==
Having burned the town of Odawara surrounding the Hōjō home castle two years earlier, Takeda Shingen laid siege to a number of other Hōjō holdings in the surrounding provinces, including Fukazawa castle, in Suruga province.

This was the sixth time he had invaded Suruga; Fukazawa castle was held by Hōjō Tsunashige, who ultimately surrendered and withdrew to Tamanawa Castle.
