= Siege of Kamakura =

The city of Kamakura, in what is now Japan's Kanagawa Prefecture, was besieged twice:

- Siege of Kamakura (1333)
- Siege of Kamakura (1526)
