= Satomi Yoshihiro =

Satomi Yoshihiro

Satomi Yoshihiro (里見 義弘; 1530 – July 5, 1578) was a samurai of the Satomi family who fought against the Hōjō clan during Japan's Sengoku period.

He participated in the Siege of Odawara (1561) against Hōjō clan under Uesugi Kenshin.

Later, he was defeated by Hōjō Ujiyasu at the battle of Kōnodai (1564); his father, Satomi Yoshitaka, had been defeated by Ujiyasu's father, Hōjō Ujitsuna, in the battle of Kōnodai (1538).

Yoshihiro also commanded forces in the 1567 battle of Mifunedai in which the enemy commander, Ōta Ujisuke, was killed.
