= Katsurayama Ujimoto =

Japanese samurai (1520–1573)

- 葛山 氏元
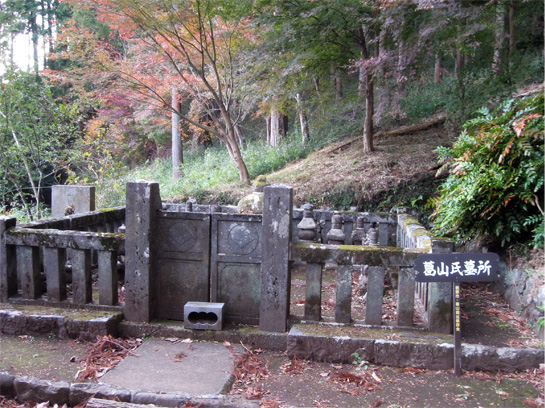
- A graveyard where the Katsurayama rests.
- Born: 1520
- Died: 1573 (aged 52–53)
- Spouse: Chiyo Hōjō (daughter of Hojo Ujitsuna)
- Children: Matsuchiyo, Takechiyo and Kuchiyo
- Relatives: Nobusada
- Military career
- Allegiance: Imagawa clan

Katsurayama Ujimoto (葛山 氏元; 1520 - 1573) was a Japanese samurai of the Sengoku period, this individual served under the Imagawa clan, and was believed to be the lord of the Katsurayama Castle, a castle located in northern Shinano Province, Japan.

== Personal life ==
Katsurayama's adoptive father was Ujihiro Katsurayama and his biological father was Sada Katsuyama. His only known wife was believed to be Chiyo Hōjō, who was born in 1526 and was the daughter of Hōjō Ujitsuna, a Japanese samurai lord and the founder of the Go-Hōjō clan. He had three children, Matsuchiyo, Takechiyo and Kuchiyo.
