= Siege of Tachibana =

- Part of Sengoku period
Date	1569
Location	Tachibana castle, Chikuzen Province, Japan
Result	Mōri victory

Belligerents
forces of Mōri Motonari	forces of Ōtomo Sōrin

Commanders and leaders
Mōri Motonari	Hetsugi Akitsura

The 1569 siege of Tachibana was one of many battles fought for control of the island of Kyūshū during Japan's Sengoku period.

Mōri Motonari led the assault on the Ōtomo clan's Tachibana castle, which was held by Hetsugi Akitsura. The Mōri, who were one of the few Sengoku-period clans to make effective or extensive use of artillery, used cannons to secure their victory.

== See also ==
- Battle of Tatarahama (1569)
