= Tamanawa Castle =

Castle ruins in Kamakura, Japan

- 玉縄城
- Kamakura, Kanagawa Prefecture, Japan
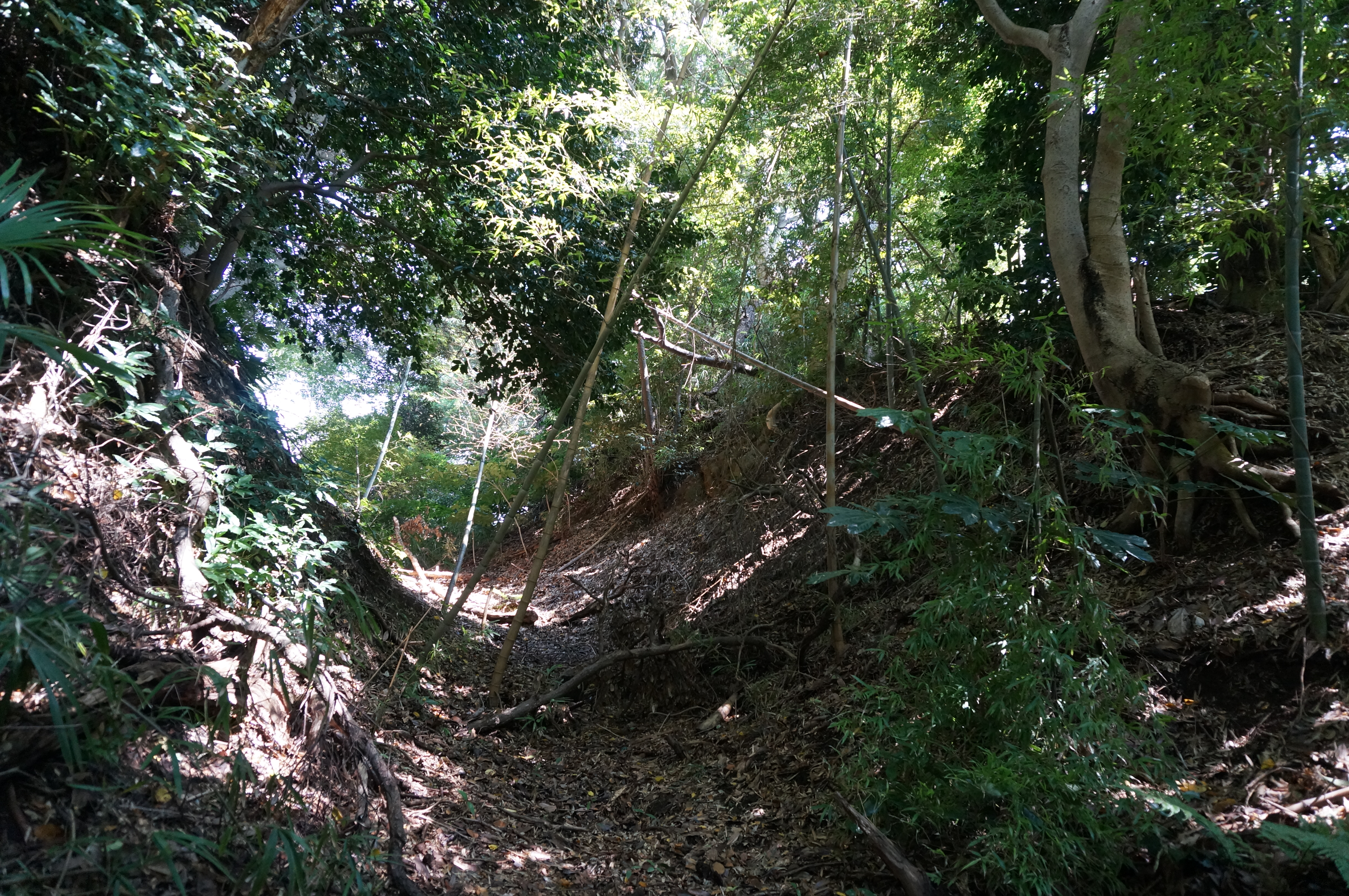
- Hirikiri style moat of Taikokuruwa compound

Site information
- Type: Hirayama-style castle
- Owner: Later Hōjō clan
- Condition: ruins

Location
- Location within Kanagawa Prefecture Location within Japan
- Coordinates: 35°21′12″N 139°30′54″E

Site history
- Built: 1512
- Built by: Hōjō Sōun
- Demolished: 1619
- Events: Siege of Kamakura (1526)

Garrison information
- Past commanders: Hōjō Tsunashige, Hōjō Ujitoki, Honda Masanobu

Tamanawa Castle (玉縄城, Tamanawa-jō) was a castle structure in Tamanawa ward of Kamakura, Kanagawa Prefecture, Japan. The adopted brother of Hōjō Ujiyasu, Hōjō Tsunashige, was commander of the castle.

== History ==
Hōjō Sōun who had been fighting with the Miura clan built the castle to avoid being attacked from behind by the Ōgigayatsu Uesugi clan's relief army. Even after the fall of the Miura clan, Tamanawa castle continued to be an important castle of the Hōjō clan as a base of defense against the Satomi clan.

In 1561, Tamanawa castle was surrounded by Uesugi Kenshin's army but he left without even attacking the castle.

During the siege of Odawara in 1590, Hōjō Ujikatsu entrenched himself in the castle but was besieged by a big army of the Tokugawa Ieyasu. In the end Ujikatsu surrendered without resistance.

After the Siege of Odawara, Tokugawa Ieyasu placed his reliable retainer Honda Masanobu. Later, the castle was given to Nagasawa Matsudaira clan, a member of the Tokugawa clan. Tamanawa castle was abandoned in 1703 when Nagasawa Matsudaira clan transferred to the Otaki Domain.

There are little remains of the castle on the present day site, just some moats and earthworks. Excavated artefacts from the castle are exhibited at Ryūhō-ji Temple near the castle.

== Access ==
The castle remains are located on the outskirts of Kamakura, close to Ōfuna Station (about 15 minutes walk from Ōfuna Station).

== Gallery ==
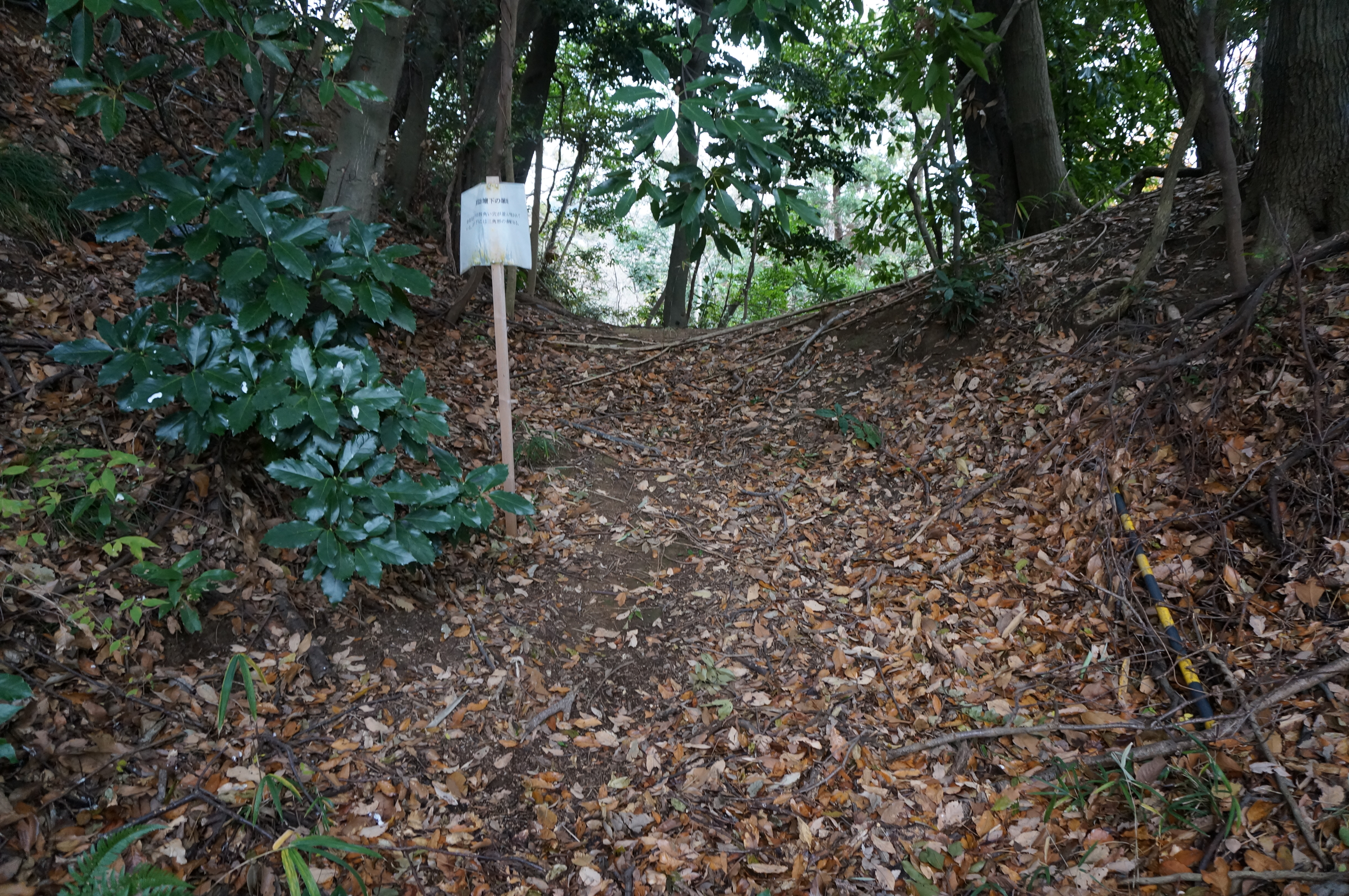
Eathen wall of Tamanawa Castle(under the Suwadan compound)

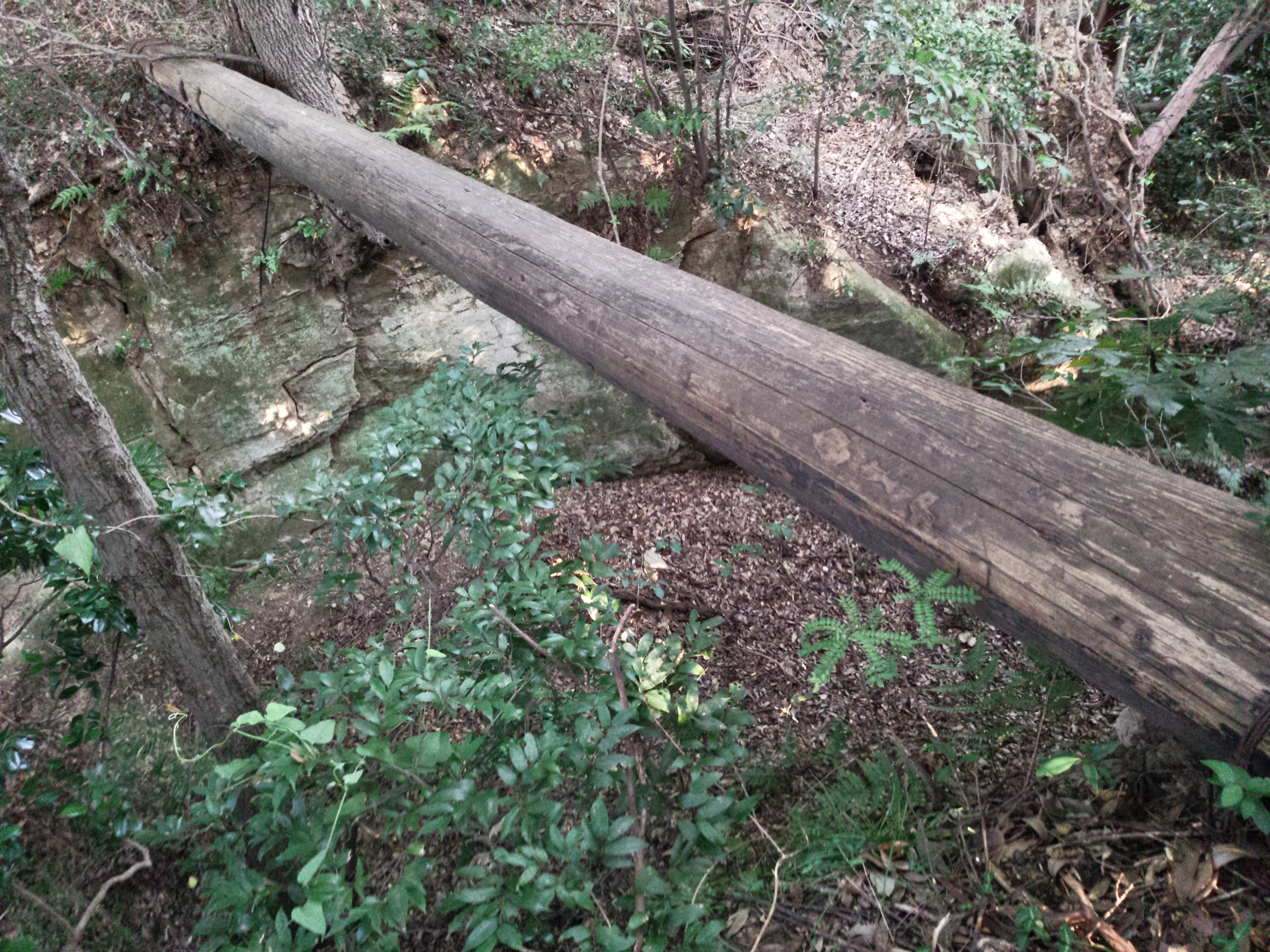
Horikiri style moat of Tamanawa Castle

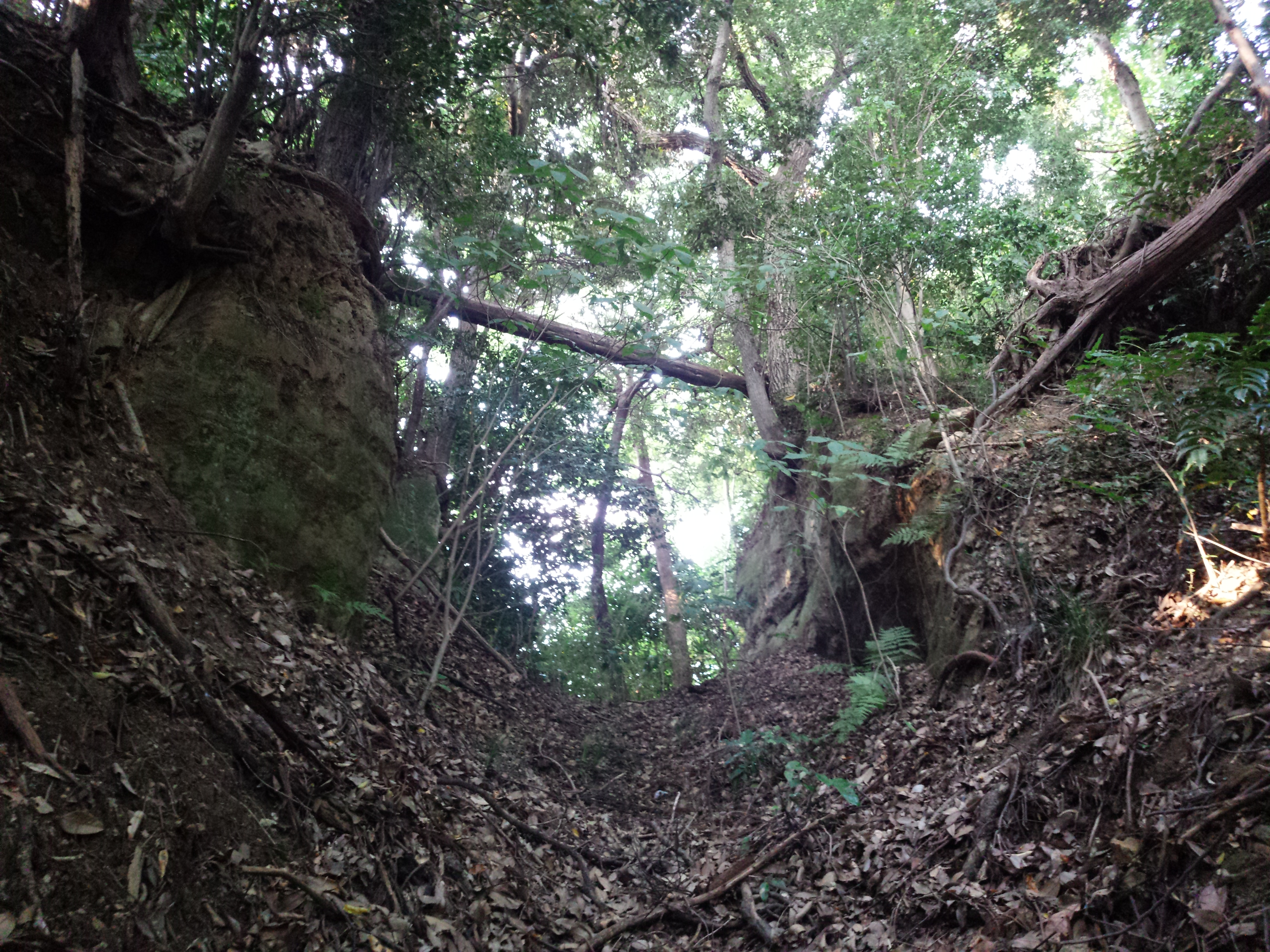
Horikiri style Moat of Tamanawa Castle

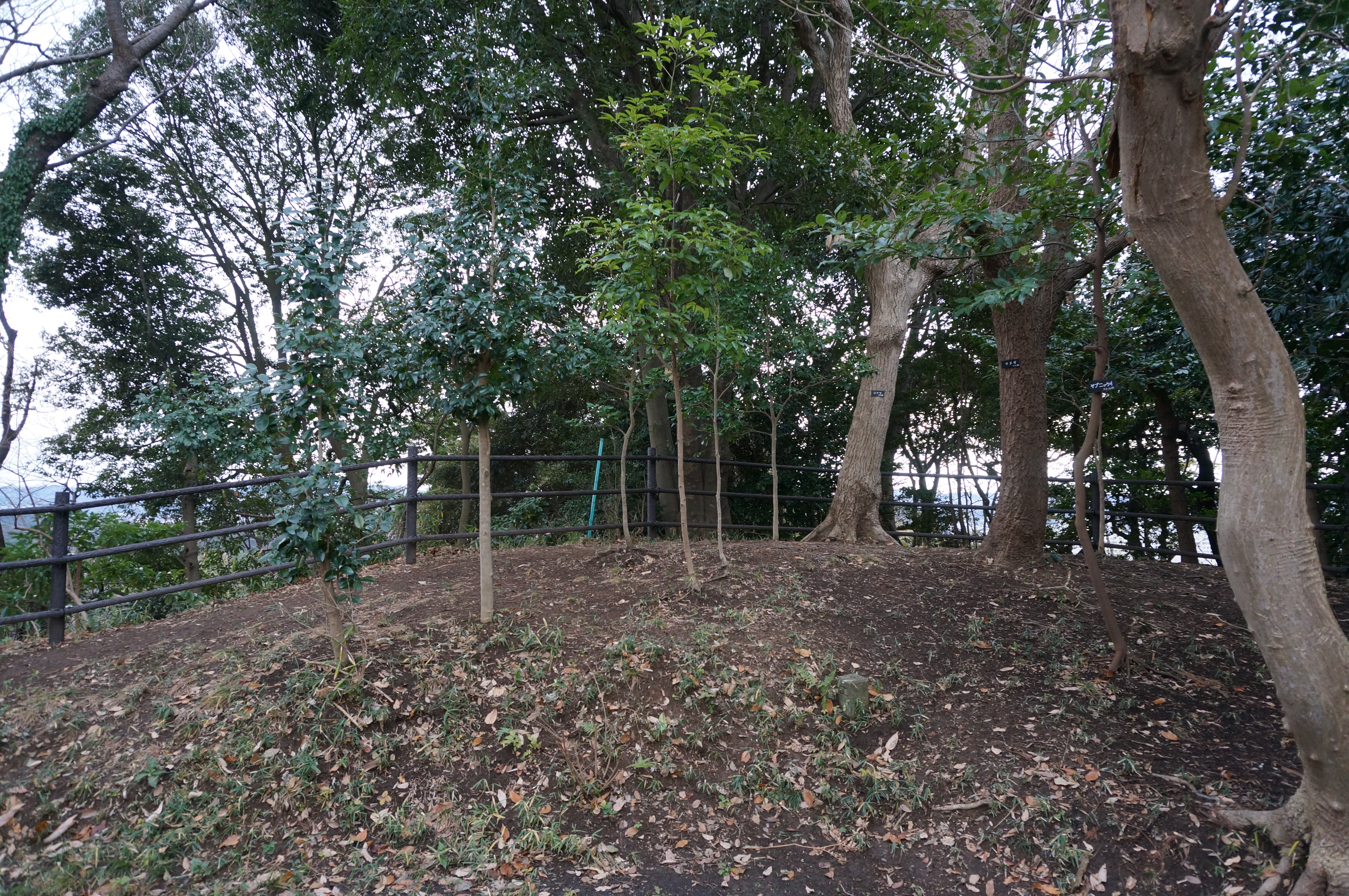
Taikokuruwa compound

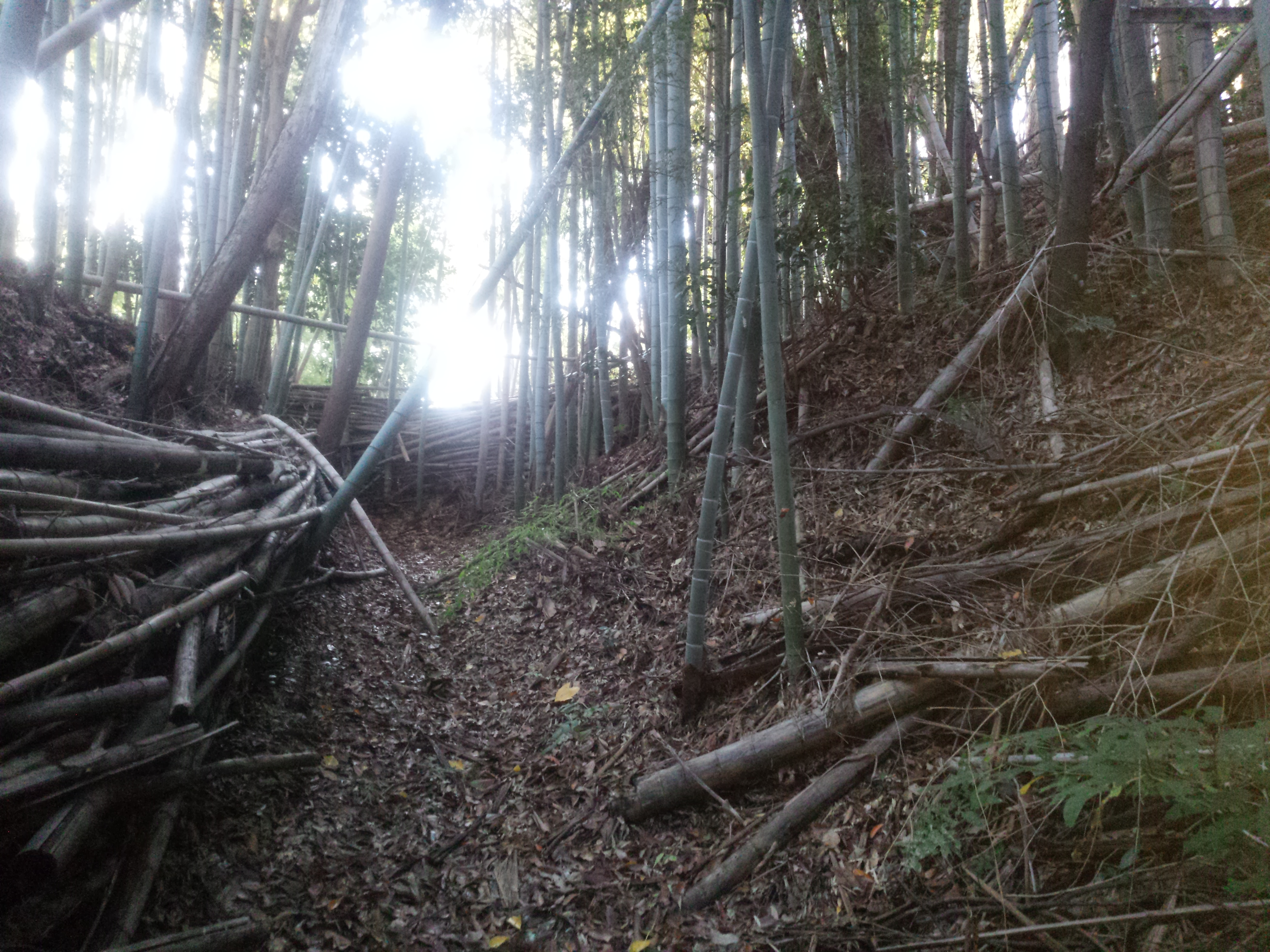
Moat and earthen wall of Kuichigai compound
