= Prince Hoshikawa Rebellion =

5h-century power struggle for the Japanese throne

The Prince Hoshikawa Rebellion was a power struggle for the Japanese Imperial throne following the death of Emperor Yūryaku in 479. The second son of the Emperor, encouraged by his mother, tried to seize authority by occupying the treasury, but was soon surrounded by troops of court officials, and was burned together with family members and other supporters. The third son, whom Yūryaku had designated crown prince, assumed the throne as Emperor Seinei in 480. This incident is related in the Nihon Shoki.

== Rebellion ==
A year before his death, Emperor Yūryaku named his third son, Prince Shiraka, his successor, purportedly due to his white hair which gave him his name (shiraka = white hair) and which seemed significant to the Emperor. The crown prince was a son with one of the Emperor's concubines Katsuragi no Karahime (葛城韓媛), who belonged to the Katsuragi branch of the influential Takenouchi clan. Shortly after the Emperor's death on the 7th day of the 8th month, 479, and before his final burial on the 9th day of the 10th month, 480, another of his consorts, Kibi no Wakahime (吉備稚媛) convinced her younger son (who was older than Prince Shiraka), Prince Hoshikawa, to assert his claim to the throne. Wakahime had been the wife of the high official, Tasa, omi of Kibi, but had been captured in a plot by Yūryaku in 463, giving rise to the Kibi Clan Rebellion.

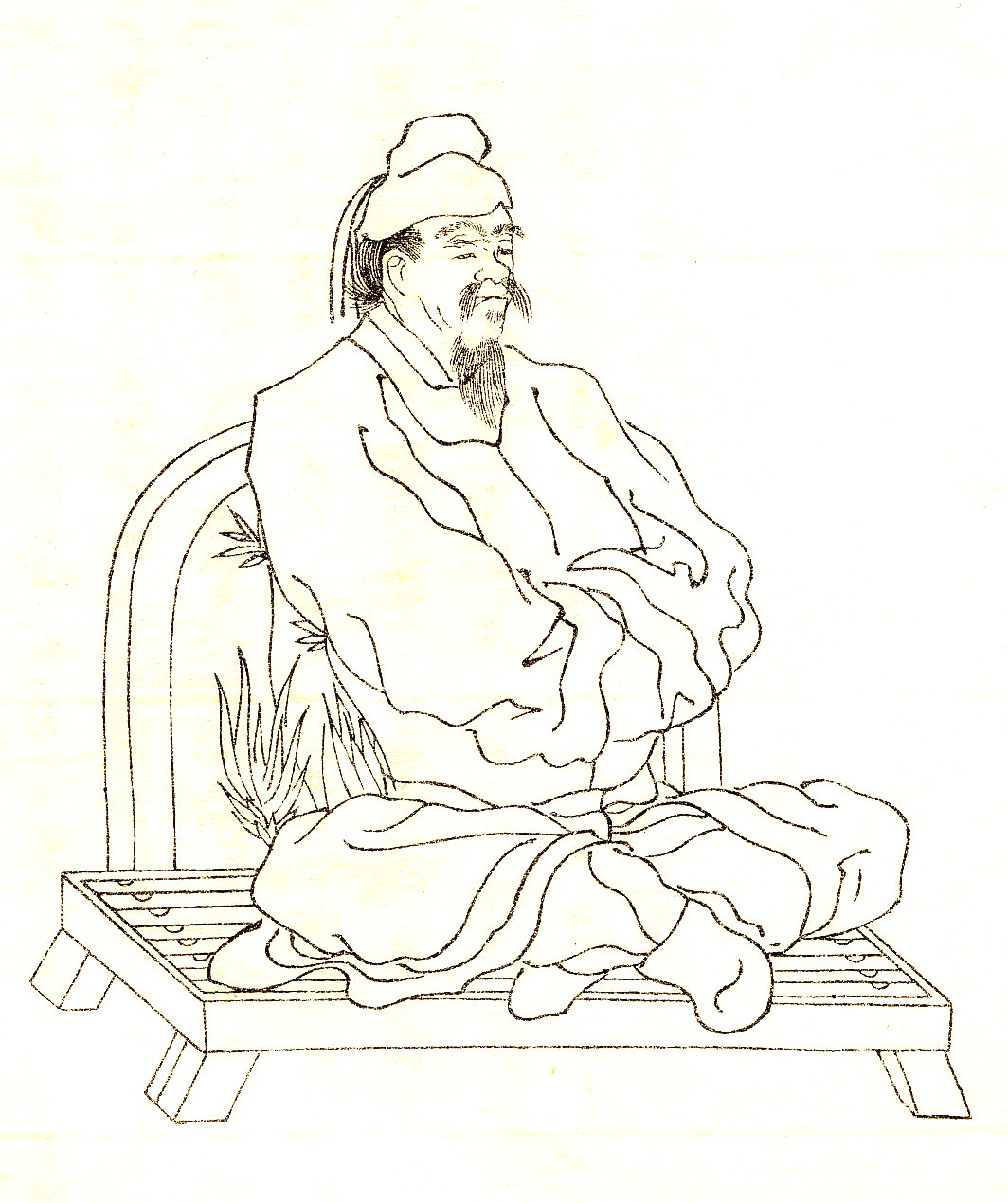
Ōtomo no Muroya, who quelled the rebellion

Hoshikawa's elder brother, Prince Iwaki, tried to interfere, but to no avail: heeding the advice of his mother, Hoshikawa seized the Imperial treasury and together with Wakahime, his half-brother, Prince Iwaki, and others, they locked themselves in the treasury. The treasury, which architecturally would have resembled a granary, was besieged by high-ranking court officials and their troops, and eventually burned together with all the people inside, except for a minor official who was spared and who, out of gratitude, later presented 25 acres of land to the commander of the triumphant army Ōmuraji, Lord Ōtomo no Muroya.

Claimants to the throne being born out of fire or surviving an ordeal of fire is a recurrent theme in the early Japanese Imperial lineage. The historian Gary Ebersole conjectures that the actual death of Prince Hoshikawa is unknown and the death by fire was used by the compilers of the Nihon Shoki to metaphorically relate that his claim to the throne was invalid. After the rebellion, the appointed crown prince, Prince Shiraka, assumed the throne as Emperor Seinei in 480.

== See also ==
- List of Japanese battles
- Military history of Japan
