= Battle of Kōnodai (1564) =

1564 battle

2nd Battle of Kōnodai
- Part of the Sengoku period
Date	1564
Location	Kōnodai, Shimōsa Province 35°45′37″N 139°53′42″E
Result	Decisive Hōjō victory

Belligerents
forces of Hōjō Ujiyasu	forces of Satomi Yoshihiro

Commanders and leaders
Hōjō Ujiyasu; Hōjō Ujimasa; Hōjō Tsunashige; Hōjō Ujiteru	Satomi Yoshihiro; Satomi Chokuro †; Ōta Sukemasa

Strength
20,000	8,000
- Location within Chiba Prefecture Battle of Kōnodai (1564) (Japan)

In the second Battle of Kōnodai, fought in 1564, Hōjō Ujiyasu led his men to victory against Satomi Yoshihiro. Both Ujiyasu and Yoshihiro were the sons of the commanders at the first battle of Kōnodai, in which Hōjō Ujitsuna defeated the combined forces of Satomi Yoshitaka and Ashikaga Yoshiaki (Oyumi).

== Battle ==
Outnumbered 20,000 to 8,000, Satomi fell back when the Hōjō vanguard advanced. But this was a feint, and an attempt to draw his enemy into a trap. However, Hōjō Ujiyasu expected a trap of this sort, and had sent his son, Ujimasa, with a small force to attack the Satomi rear, surrounding, and later Ujiyasu defeated Yoshihiro. In the ensuing battle, Satomi Yoshihiro saw his son, Chokuro, killed by Matsuda Yasuyoshi, a Hōjō retainer.

== Aftermath ==
Hōjō Ujiyasu celebrated his victory with a poem:

Conquering the foe
As I wished at Kōnodai
Now do I behold
The evening sunshine of Katsuura

After the battle, Matsuda Yasuyoshi who had killed Yoshihiro's son, entered a life of monkhood, feeling remorse for the death of the young boy.
