= Kibi Clan Rebellion =

463 revolt against the Yamato state

The Kibi Clan Rebellion (吉備氏の乱, kibishi no ran) from 463 was a revolt against the Yamato state on the Korean Peninsula, involving two brothers from the Kibi clan: Tasa and Oto. The revolt was triggered when Tasa learned that the Japanese Emperor Yūryaku had moved him to the Japanese post at Mimana on the Korean Peninsula in order to seize his beautiful wife. The incident falls into Japan's proto-historic period and is recounted in the Nihon Shoki.

== Outline ==
When Yūryaku ascended the throne in 456, Japan was on friendly terms with the Korean kingdom of Paekche. However relations with the neighboring kingdom of Silla had been strained after the harsh treatment of their convoy in 453. (Note: According to the Nihon Shoki, members of the convoy had been imprisoned and questioned being suspected to have had dealing with the female attendants (uneme) after referring to Mount Unebe by the (incorrect) name uneme.) Angered by this incident, Silla had reduced the number of ships between the countries and articles sent as tribute. Since 456, Silla had not sent the customary presents to the Japanese Emperor.

In 463, Tasa, omi of Upper Kibi, was at the Imperial Palace and speaking to his friends, praised his wife, Waka:

Of all the beautiful women in the Empire, there is none to compare with my wife. How blooming! How gentle! How graced with various charms! How radiant! How genial! What perfection in every feature! She uses not flower of lead: she adds not oil of orchids. Through the wide ages her equals are but few: in the present day she stands alone and peerless.

In order to possess Waka, Emperor Yūryaku had Tasa moved out of the way to the distant post of governor of Mimana and made Waka-hime one of his concubines. When Tasa learned that he had been robbed of his wife, he started a revolt looking for help from Silla. Yūryaku, known for his cruelty, ordered Tasa's son, Oto, to lead an army against his father. Oto was joined by a group of men who wanted to secure skilled artisans from Paekche. Oto had settled for several months in Paekche (without taking any action against Tasa or Silla) when he received a message from his father suggesting he hold Mimana and Paekche and break off communication with Japan:

Do thou, my son, come over and betake thyself to Pekche, and prevent it from communicating with Japan, while I will repair to and hold Imna, and will also hold no communication with Japan.

However Oto's wife, Kusu, was a very patriotic woman who foiled Tasa's plot by killing her husband. Over several years, Yūryaku sent four expeditions to Korea, but could not recover his hold on the peninsula. Brinkley asserts that Japan lost its standing in Korea "because of Yūryaku's illicit passion for one of his subjects." After the death of Yūryaku on the 7th day of the 8th month, 479, Prince Hoshikawa, encouraged by his mother, the "robbed" consort Waka-hime, claimed the throne against the designated crown prince, Shiraka, which led to the Prince Hoshikawa Rebellion.

== See also ==
- List of Japanese battles
- Military history of Japan
- Iwai Rebellion
