= Hōjō Genan =

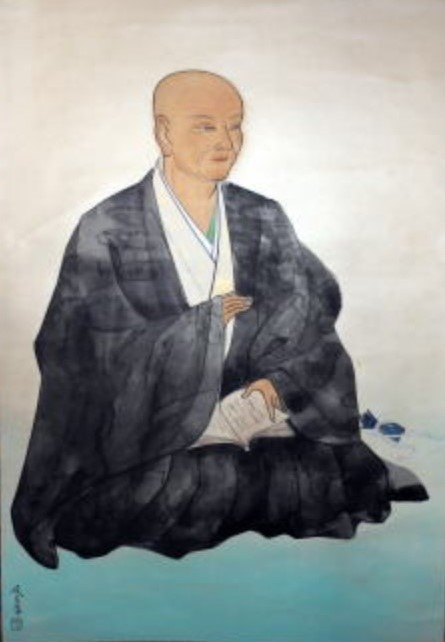
Hōjō Genan

Hōjō Genan (北条 幻庵; 1493 – December 8, 1589) was a Japanese Samurai of the Sengoku period. He was the second and youngest son of Hōjō Sōun. and brother of Hōjō Ujitsuna. Genan was a highly educated samurai, thus he worked as a diplomat of the Later Hōjō clan.

With his brother, he was fought at the Siege of Edo (1524), Battle of Nashinokidaira (1526), Siege of Edo (1535), Siege of Musashi-Matsuyama (1537), and Battle of Kōnodai (1538).

Genan's son Hōjō Ujinobu was attacked by the Takeda clan and died during the Siege of Kanbara in 1569.

He was the only person who saw from start to end of the Gohojo clan among vassals whose records were left, serving all leaders from the first Hōjō Soun to the last leader, Hōjō Ujinao.
