= Tachibanayama Castle =

Castle ruins in Chikuzen Province, Japan

Coordinates: 33°40′47″N 130°28′06″E

- 立花山城
- Tachibana Mountain, Higashi-ku, Fukuoka, Japan
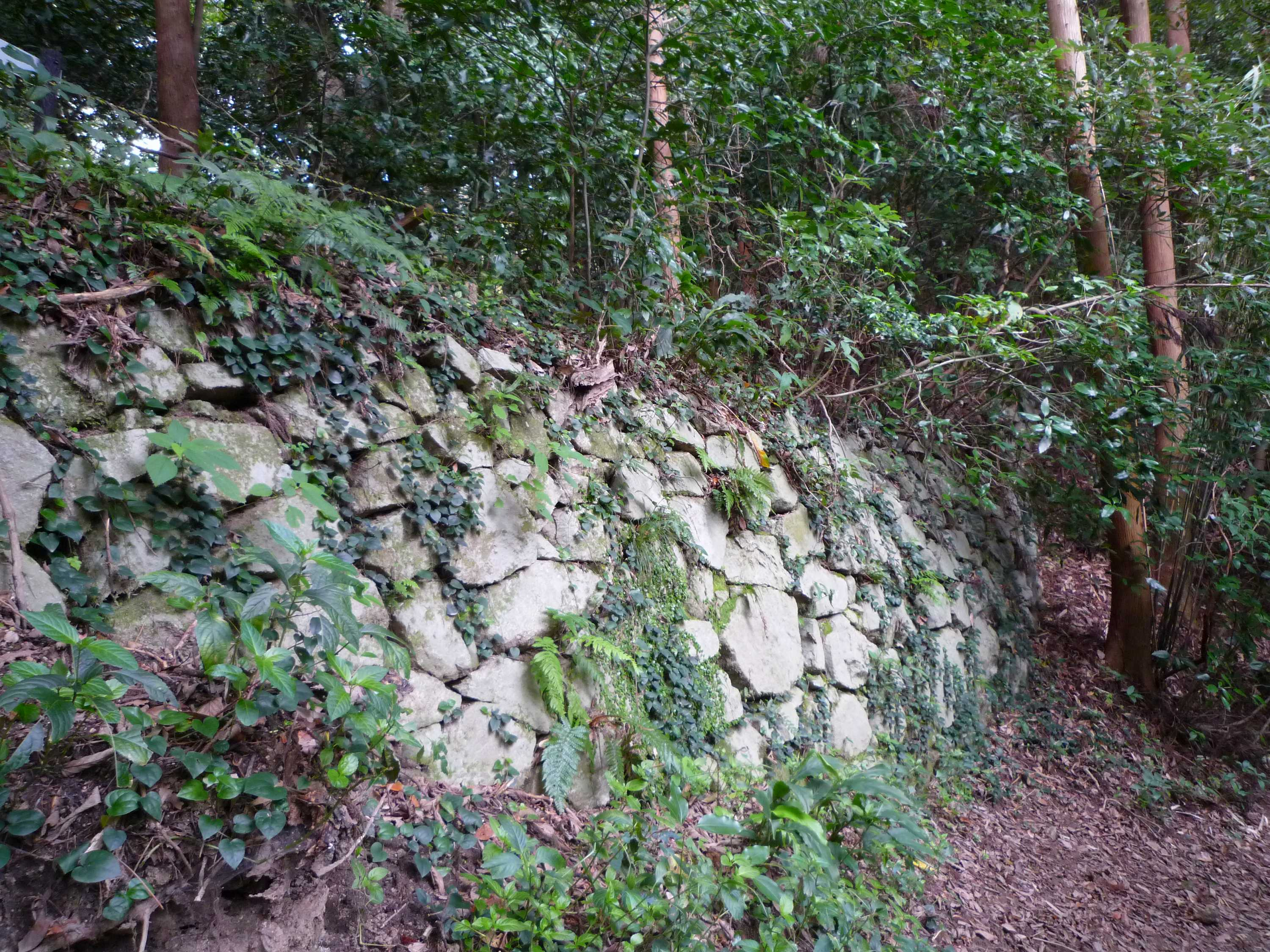
- Stone wall of Tachibana Castle

Site information
- Type: Kamakura period Japanese castle
- Controlled by: Ōtomo clan (1330–1569, 1569–1586), Mōri clan (1569), Toyotomi Hideyoshi (1586–1598), Tokugawa Ieyasu/Tokugawa shogunate (1598 – c. 1603)
- Condition: Ruins of stone elements of keep, wells and waterworks remain

Location

Site history
- Built: 1330
- Built by: Ōtomo Sadatoshi
- In use: 1330–1586
- Materials: Wood, stone, plaster
- Demolished: c. 1603
- Battles/wars: Battle of Tatarahama (1569), Kyūshū Campaign (1586)

Garrison information
- Past commanders: Tachibana Ginchiyo (c. 1575), Kobayakawa Takakage (c. 1586–1598)

Tachibanayama Castle (立花山城, Tachibanayama-jō) was a Japanese castle in Chikuzen Province, in the north of Kyūshū. It was at the peak of Mount Tachibana, extending in part into the Higashi-ku in Fukuoka. The castle is also known as Rikka-jō, Tachibana-jō, or Rikkasan-jō.

== History ==
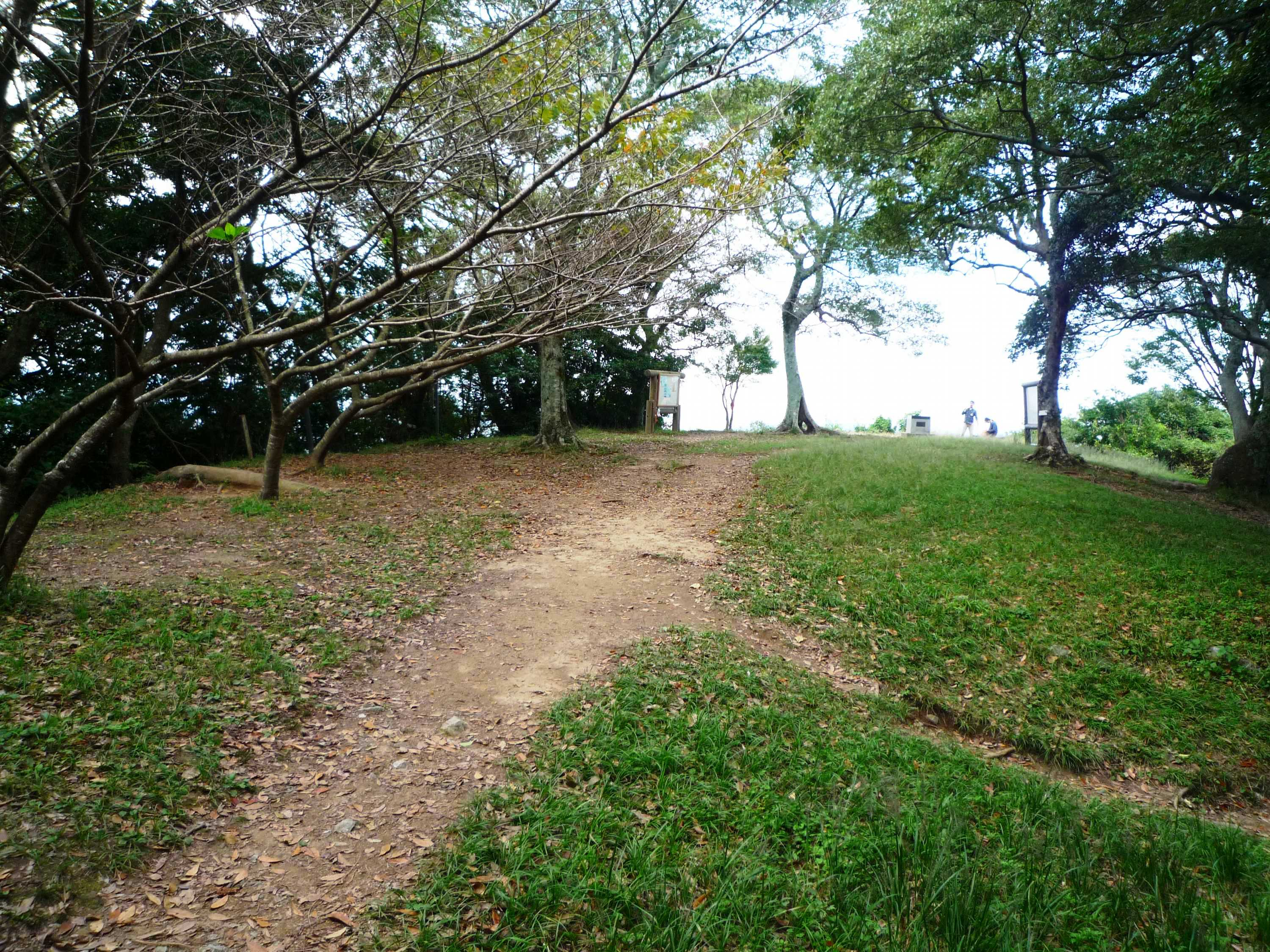
Tachibana Castle

The castle was originally built in 1330, by Ōtomo Sadatoshi, Constable (shugo) of Bungo Province, as a show of support to the Tachibana clan. Since it was in a tactically powerful location, looking down upon the port town of Hakata, the castle was fought over throughout the Sengoku period by the Ōtomo, Ōuchi, and Mōri clans.

In one of the more significant sieges, the Ōtomo clan lost the castle to the Mōri clan in 1569, who had become one of the most skilled and powerful clans in the field of naval warfare; their use of Western-style cannon granted them a large advantage in this battle. They abandoned it soon afterwards, however, following a defeat at Tatarahama to an allied Ōtomo-Amago clan force.

The castle was besieged once more, in 1586, by the Shimazu family; the castle's lord at the time was Tachibana Muneshige. However, the Shimazu would fail in their siege and Muneshige successfully defended the castle. Soon after, Toyotomi Hideyoshi would arrive and launch his Kyūshū Campaign, which he would also gain the assistance of the Ōtomo. After Hideyoshi's conquest of Kyūshū ended with the surrender of the Shimazu, Muneshige and his clan were given Yanagawa castle, whereas Tachibana Castle would be entrusted in the care of Kobayakawa Takakage.

A little over a decade later, at the beginning of the Edo period, Tachibana was largely destroyed and dismantled, much of the stone going into the construction of Fukuoka Castle. Today, remnants of the honmaru (central keep), the wells and waterworks survive.
