= Siege of Musashi-Matsuyama (1563) =

1563 battle in Japan

- Part of the Sengoku period
Date	1563
Location	Matsuyama Castle, Musashi province 36°02′13″N 139°25′16″E
Result	Siege successful; castle falls to the Hōjō and Takeda

Belligerents
Uesugi clan castle garrison and Ōta clan forces	Combined forces of Hōjō Ujiyasu and Takeda Shingen

Commanders and leaders
Uesugi Norikatsu; Ōta Sukemasa	Hōjō Ujiyasu; Takeda Shingen

Strength
10,000	24,000
- Location within Saitama Prefecture Siege of Musashi-Matsuyama (1563) (Japan)

In Japanese history, the 1563 siege of Musashi-Matsuyama was a successful attempt by a combined Takeda clan-Hōjō clan army to regain Musashi province and Matsuyama castle from the Uesugi clan; the Hōjō had seized the castle from the Uesugi in the first siege of Musashi-Matsuyama (1537) but lost it, and in 1563 so sought to regain control of it once more.

Musashi-Matsuyama, situated in Japan's Musashi province (today Saitama prefecture), is so called simply to distinguish it from the other locations known as Matsuyama Castle throughout Japan. Retaken by the Uesugi, who held it originally before the Hōjō siege twenty-six years earlier, it came under siege from the Hōjō and Takeda very soon after it was regained. The besieging army, under the command of Takeda Shingen and Hōjō Ujiyasu, employed a team of miners to dig under the castle's defenses, allowing the greater portion of their force easier access to their target.
