= Hōjō Ujitsuna =

Japanese samurai lord (1487-1541)

- 北条 氏綱
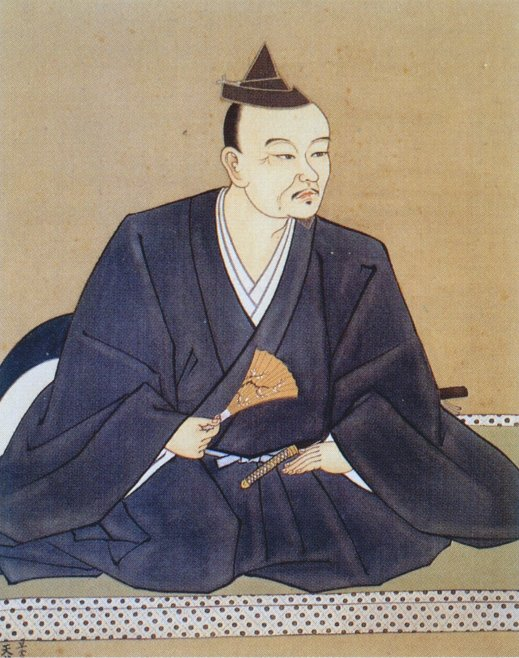

Head of Later Hōjō clan
- In office 1519–1541
- Preceded by: Hōjō Sōun
- Succeeded by: Hōjō Ujiyasu

Personal details
- Born: 1487
- Died: August 10, 1541 (aged 53–54) Odawara Castle, Sagami Province, Japan
- Children: Hōjō Ujiyasu (son); Hōjō Tsunashige (adopted son)
- Parent: Hōjō Sōun (father)
- Relatives: Hōjō Genan (brother)

Military service
- Allegiance: Later Hōjō clan
- Rank: Lord (Daimyō)
- Commands: Odawara castle
- Battles/wars: Siege of Edo (1524); Battle of Nashinokidaira (1526); Siege of Edo (1535); Siege of Musashi-Matsuyama (1537); Battle of Kōnodai (1538)

Hōjō Ujitsuna (北条 氏綱; 1487 – August 10, 1541) was a Japanese samurai lord of the Sengoku period. He was the son of Hōjō Sōun, the founder of the Go-Hōjō clan. He continued his father's quest to gain control of Kantō (the region around present-day Tokyo).

== Biography ==
In 1524, Ujitsuna took Edo Castle, which was controlled by Uesugi Tomooki, thus beginning a long-running rivalry between the Hōjō and Uesugi families.

In 1526, Hojo Ujitsuna was defeated by Takeda Nobutora in the Battle of Nashinokidaira. Later, the Uesugi attacked and burned Tsurugaoka Hachimangū in Kamakura, which was a major loss to the Hōjō symbolically, because the earlier Hōjō clan from which they took their name fell in the Siege of Kamakura (1333). (Ujitsuna soon started rebuilding Tsurugaoka Hachimangū and was completed in 1540.) In 1530, his son Ujiyasu defeated Uesugi Tomooki in the Battle of Ozawahara.

The Uesugi attacked Edo again in 1535, when Ujitsuna was away fighting the Takeda; however, Ujitsuna returned and defeated Uesugi Tomooki reclaiming his lands.

When Uesugi Tomooki died in 1537, Ujitsuna took the opportunity to occupy Musashi province and seize Kawagoe Castle to secure his control of the Kantō.

In 1538, Ujitsuna then went on to win the battle of Kōnodai, securing Shimōsa Province for the Hōjō.

In 1539, he defeated the Koga Kubo Yoshiaki (Oyumi Kubo) and gained control of Awa Province (Chiba).

Over the next several years before his death in 1541, Ujitsuna oversaw the rebuilding of Kamakura, making it a symbol of the growing power of the Hōjō, along with Odawara and Edo. He was succeeded as head of the Hōjō clan and lord of Odawara by his son Hōjō Ujiyasu.

== Family ==
- Father: Hōjō Sōun
- Younger Brother: Hōjō Genan
- Mother: Nan’nyōin-dono
- Wife: Yōjuin-dono
- Concubine: Konoe-dono
- Children:
  - Hōjō Ujiyasu by Yōjuin-dono
  - Hōjō Tsunashige (Adopted child)
  - Hōjō Tamemasa (1520-1542)
  - Hōjō Ujitaka (1522-1562)
  - Jōshin’in married Ōta Suketaka
  - daughter married Kira Yoriyasu
  - Hōshun’in married Ashikaga Haruuji
  - Sakihime married Horikoshi Sadatomo
  - Daichōin married Hōjō Tsunamori
  - Chiyo married Katsurayama Ujimoto
