= Fukazawa =

Fukazawa (written: 深澤) is a Japanese surname. Notable people with the surname include:

- Masahiro Fukazawa, Japanese sportsperson
- Shichirō Fukazawa, Japanese writer
- Masao Fukazawa, Japanese actor
- Yōko Fukazawa (深澤 洋子, born 1967), Japanese speed skater
