= Battle of Nashinokidaira =

1526 battle in Japan

Battle of Nashinokidara
- Part of the Sengoku period
Date	8 July 1526
Location	Nashinokidaira, Japan
Result	Takeda victory

Belligerents
Takeda clan	Hōjō clan

Commanders and leaders
Takeda Nobutora	Hōjō Ujitsuna; Hōjō Genan

Strength
12,000	14,000

The 1526 battle of Nashinokidaira (梨の木平の戦い) was one of many battles fought between the Takeda and Hōjō clans in Japan's Sengoku period. On 8 July of that year, the battle was won by Takeda Nobutora over Hōjō Ujitsuna.
