= Satake Yoshishige =

Japanese daimyō

- 佐竹 義重
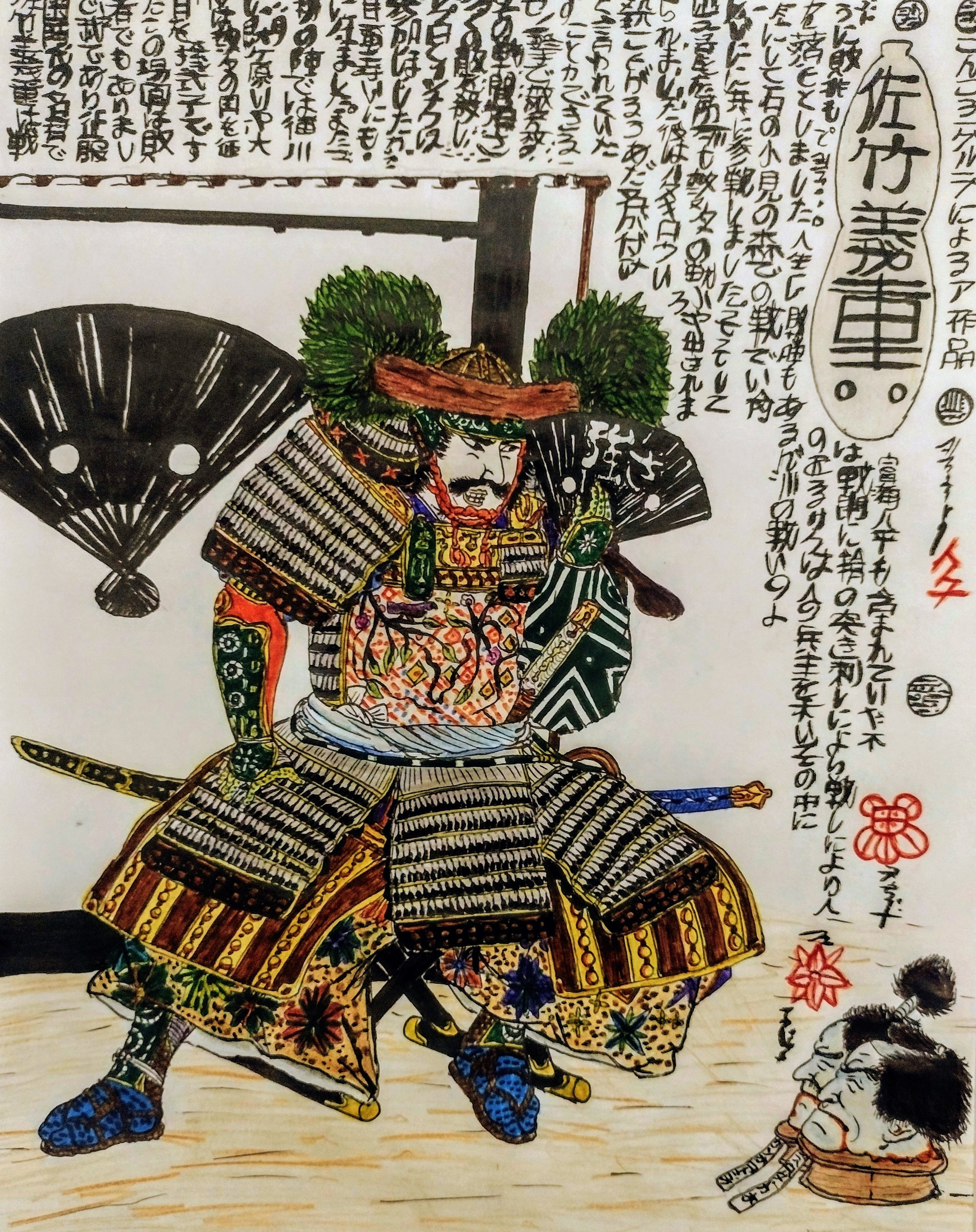

Head of Satake clan
- In office 1562–1589
- Preceded by: Satake Yoshiaki
- Succeeded by: Satake Yoshinobu

Personal details
- Born: March 7, 1547 Hitachi Province
- Died: May 19, 1612 (aged 65) Rukugo, Senboku District, Dewa Province
- Children: Satake Yoshinobu; Iwaki Sadataka
- Parent: Satake Yoshiaki (father)
- Nickname(s): "Ogre Yoshishige" (Oni Yoshishige)

Military service
- Allegiance: Satake clan Toyotomi clan Eastern army
- Rank: Daimyo
- Commands: Ota Castle
- Battles/wars: Battle of Numajiri (1567); Battle of Hitotoribashi (1586); Battle of Suriagehara (1589); Siege of Odawara (1590); Kunohe rebellion (1591); Sekigahara campaign (1600)

Satake Yoshishige (佐竹 義重; March 7, 1547 – May 19, 1612) was a Japanese daimyō (military lord) of the Sengoku period. He was the 18th generation head of the Satake clan. He was renowned for his ferocity in battle; he was also known by the nickname of "Ogre Yoshishige" (鬼義重, Oni Yoshishige).

== Biography ==
Yoshishige (whose rank was Hitachi no suke) was the eldest son of Satake Yoshiaki (1531-1565) and held Ota Castle in Hitachi Province. His father, whose health was failing, handed over leadership to Yoshishige in 1562 and died three years later. It is said in the Sengoku jinmei jiten (462-63) that he officially retired from head of Satake family sometime in 1587 or 1589.

An aggressive lord, Yoshishige consolidated the Satake's hold over Hitachi and fought with such local houses as the Ashina, Oda, and Naya. While he would take Shirakawa Castle from the Yûki, Yoshishige's primary concern was to be the Hôjô family. Yoshishige organized his followers and henchmen into four groups: ichimon, fudai, tozama, and kakushō-shu.

In 1567, he allied with the Satomi and Utsunomiya. Yoshishige resisted Hôjô expansion into the eastern Kanto region for many years, who were extending their power into southern Hitachi. One such encounter was the Battle of Numajiri, where 20,000 men under Yoshishige fought 80,000 Hojo troops. The Satake won, due in part to the use of over 8600 matchlock rifles by their troops.

In the mid-1580s, Yoshishige also became involved in actions against Mutsu's rising star, Date Masamune. Yoshishige allied with the Ashina and Sôma (both former Satake rivals) and contributed his strength to their war with the Date, with Satake troops fighting at the Battle of Hitotoribashi (1586), the Kōriyama Campaign (1588), and Battle of Suriagehara (1589).

Yoshishige handed official control of the Satake to his son Yoshinobu in 1589 but remained effectively in command afterwards. The Satake submitted to Toyotomi Hideyoshi in 1590 and sent their forces to assist in the Odawara Campaign.

When sides were being drawn up in 1600 between Tokugawa Ieyasu and Ishida Mitsunari, Yoshinobu waffled. He at first decided to join Ishida's cause and sent messages to Uesugi Kagekatsu, then, at the last moment, hesitated and made as if to join Tokugawa. In the aftermath of the Battle of Sekigahara, Yoshishige was able to intercede on behalf of Yoshinobu when the latter was set to be punished by Tokugawa Ieyasu for his indecisive behavior. The Satake were only made to transfer to Akita in 1602 - albeit at the cost of over half their income (from 545,000 koku to roughly 200,000 koku). Yoshishige afterwards lived in Rokugo Castle. Yoshishige was known as a tough campaigner and carried the nickname Ôni Yoshishige (Devil Yoshishige).

There remain many anecdotes on the life of Yoshishige. For example, it is said he did not use a futon to sleep on, instead preparing only a thin mat. Possibly he began this custom because he was always devoting himself to war and thus spent many nights in the field with his army. After he moved to Rokugo, his son Yoshinobu, concerned for his comfort in the cold climate, sent a futon for him to use. Out of respect for his son, Yoshishige attempted to sleep on the futon but found himself unable to get comfortable. He therefore returned to his old campaigning mat and slept on it.

Yoshishige's most notable retainers included Wada Awa no kami Akitame, Kajiwara Mino no kami Masakage, and Satake Yoshisuke. His son Sadataka was adopted into the family of Tsunetaka (Iwaki clan) and became his heir.

== Works cited ==
- 泉田邦彦; 今泉徹; 坂本正仁; 柴裕之; 関周一; 高橋修; 中根正人; 森木悠介 (26 March 2021). 佐々木倫郎; 千葉篤志 (eds.). 戦国佐竹氏研究の最前線 (in Japanese). Tōkyō: Yamakawa Shuppansha. ISBN 978-4-634-15181-9. NCID BC06499277, NAID 110007707970, JPNO 23512961, NDLBibID:031345101.
