= Battle of Ozawahara =

- Part of the Sengoku period
Date	1530
Location	Ozawahara, Musashi Province, Japan 35°35′37″N 139°30′09″E
Result	Hojo victory

Belligerents
Forces of the Hōjō clan	Forces of the Uesugi clan

Commanders and leaders
Hōjō Ujiyasu	Uesugi Tomooki
- Location within Kanagawa Prefecture Battle of Ozawahara (Japan)

The Battle of Ozawahara (Japanese: 小沢原の戦い) was fought in 1530 in the present day Asao, Kawasaki, Kanagawa. This was the first battle for Hōjō Ujiyasu, then sixteen years old.

Ujiyasu faced Uesugi Tomooki at Ozawahara in Musashi Province. The battle was part of a seventeen-year struggle between the Hōjō clan and the Uesugi clan for control of the Kantō region which began with the 1524 Siege of Edo. The battle ended with a Hōjō victory.
