= Battle of Numajiri =

1567 battle in Hitachi Province, Japan

- Part of the Sengoku period
Date	1584
Location	Hitachi Province, Japan
Result	Satake clan victory

Belligerents
Later Hōjō clan	Satake clan Yuki clan Utsunomiya clan

Commanders and leaders
Hojo Ujinao; Hojo Ujiteru	Satake Yoshishige; Utsunomiya Kunituna

Strength
80,000 troops	20,000 men

The Battle of Numajiri (ぬまじりのかっせん) took place between May and August of 1584 (Tenshō 12), fought between the Later Hōjō clan’s forces and the allied armies of the Satake and Utsunomiya clans.

The battlefront stretched from east to west along the southern tip of Kozuke and Shimotsuke provinces, where the two sides clashed at Numajiri (present-day Fujioka area of Tochigi City ), between the Hōjō side's objective of Koizumi Castle and the Satake and Utsunomiya side's objective of Oyama Castle.

The military chronicle Kōsen Gosenkiki, offering the smallest troop estimates, lists the Hōjō camp at 3,500 cavalry and the Satake/Utsunomiya camp at 3,000. Both sides reached Numajiri in early May, established camps, and fought no decisive battle; the stalemate dragged on. Imamiya Rituals (biography of Imamiya Shrine, Sakura City, Tochigi Prefecture) states the conflict lasted 110 days.

Throughout, both armies disrupted enemy supply lines, courted distant allies, and raided nearby outposts. Concurrently, the 1584 (Tenshō 12) Battle of Komaki-Nagakute pitted Hashiba Hideyoshi against Tokugawa Ieyasu and Oda Nobukatsu. The Nagakute City Local History Research Group held lecture in October 2024, advanced a new perspective that the Battle of Komaki and Nagakute between Hideyoshi Toyotomi and Tokugawa Ieyasu was indirectly influenced by the battle of Numajiri which initiated by the Hōjō clan. The aggression of the Hōjō prompted many northern Kanto Region daimyo asked for Hideyoshi's aid. In turn, Hideyoshi wrote a letter which preserved in Dai Nihon Shiryō, where the lett content is about Hideyoshi's strong rebuke to Ieyasu for his lack of progress in ensuring the order in Northern Kanto. The research group believed this letter makes Ieyasu felt threatened, which may become a factor that motivates Ieyasu to Hideyoshi's authority.

Satake and Utsunomiya kept close ties with Hideyoshi, while Uesugi Kagekatsu dispatched troops to Shinano on his orders to restrain the Hōjō. The Hōjō, meanwhile, built on their prior peace with Ieyasu, hinting at an anti-Hideyoshi alliance; they soon joined Komaki-Nagakute. Hōjō bribes to Kajiwara Masakage further threatened Satake's base.

Ieyasu, for his part, maintained bonds with northern Kantō lords—cultivated against the Hōjō from the Kai Conquest through the Tenshō-Jingo war—despite their truce. On August 20 (lunar July 15), Hōjō persuaded Minagawa Hiroteru and others to defect, seizing Iwafune-jin Castle (modern Iwafune district, Tochigi City)—a key Satake/Utsunomiya retreat (Battle of Iwafuneyama). This ignited unrest in both sides' hinterlands, prompting a peace treaty on August 27 (lunar July 22). The Hōjō withdrew the next day. The treaty terms indicates restoration the status quo of the regions before Yura and Nagao clans' attack on Koizumi Castle.

The most remarkable feature of this battle is that—if the historical sources are to be trusted—the Northern Kantō allied forces prepared more than 8,000 matchlock guns, which at the time were the latest weaponry. This number exceeds even the famous Battle of Nagashino, where Oda Nobunaga is said to have mobilized about 3,000 guns.
