= Matsuyama Castle =

Matsuyama Castle (松山城; -jō) is the name of several castles in Japan:

- Bitchū Matsuyama Castle, Takahashi, Okayama (former Bitchū Province)
- Matsuyama Castle (Iyo), Matsuyama, Ehime (former Iyo Province)
- Musashi Matsuyama Castle, Yoshimi, Saitama (former Musashi province)
