= Uesugi Tomooki =

Lord of Edo Castle and enemy of the Hōjō clan

Uesugi Tomooki 上杉朝興
- Born: 1488
- Died: 1537 (aged 48–49)
- Military career
- Allegiance: Ōgigayatsu Uesugi family
- Rank: Castellan (daimyō)
- Conflicts: Siege of Arai (1516); Siege of Edo (1524); Battle of Ozawahara (1530); Siege of Musashi-Matsuyama (1537)

Uesugi Tomooki (上杉 朝興; 1488 – June 4, 1537) was a lord of Edo Castle and enemy of the Hōjō clan, who seized the castle in 1524. He was the son of Uesugi Tomoyoshi, who was among the first to oppose the Hōjō's rise to power.

== Biography ==
In 1516, Tomooki took part in the siege of Arai against Hōjō Sōun.

In 1524, Tomooki attempted to take the initiative in defending Edo Castle by marching his troops out to meet the Hōjō army in battle. However, his opponent circled around behind the sallying force, taking the castle with the help of Ōta Suketada, the castle keeper who betrayed the Uesugi to the Hōjō.

In 1530, he was defeated at the Battle of Ozawahara against Hōjō Ujiyasu.

Tomooki was of the Ōgigayatsu branch of the Uesugi family. His eldest legitimate son was Uesugi Tomosada.

The "Ōgigayatsu branch" was not the more famous and powerful than "Yamanouchi branch" to which Uesugi Norimasa and Uesugi Kenshin belonged.

== See also ==
- Uesugi clan
