= Katsurayama Castle =

Castle in Japan

Katsurayama Castle ruins
- 葛山城
- Susono, Shizuoka, Japan
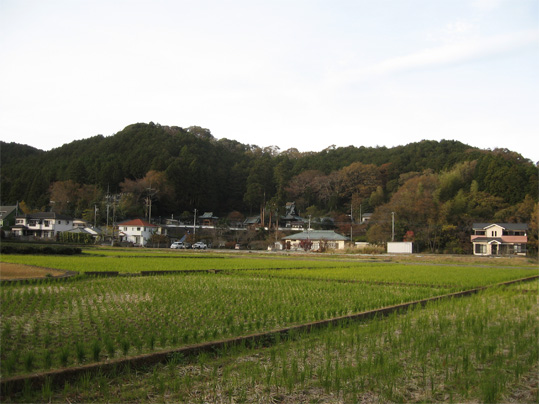
- Image of the site of Katsurayama Castle, destroyed during the Siege of Katsurayama in March 1557.

Site information
- Type: Teikaku-style hirayama castle
- Controlled by: Uesugi clan
- Open to the public: Yes
- Condition: Destroyed

Location
- Location of Katsurayama castle Katsurayama Castle ruins (Japan)
- Coordinates: 35°12′21″N 138°53′36″E

Site history
- Built: c.15th century
- Built by: Kuzuyama
- In use: Sengoku period
- Materials: Stone, Wood, Plaster walls
- Demolished: 1557
- Battles/wars: Siege of Katsurayama

Katsurayama Castle (葛山城, Katsurayama-jō), also known as Kazurayama Castle, was a Japanese castle in Susono, Shizuoka, Japan.

== Location ==
The ruins of Katsurayama Castle are located at the summit of Mount Atago, 270.4 meters above sea level, towards the end of the eastward ridge of Mount Ashitaka.

== History ==
Katsurayama Castle was built during the Sengoku period of Japan. Around 1557, Baba Nobuharu, one of the "Twenty-Four Generals of Takeda Shingen" decided to besiege the castle. His plan was carried out in March 1557 when he and 6,000 samurai and ashigaru succeeded in destroying the castle and killing the castle garrison.
