= Siege of Katsurayama =

1557 Japanese military event

Coordinates: 36.6709°N 138.1662°E

- Part of the Kawanakajima campaigns (Sengoku period)
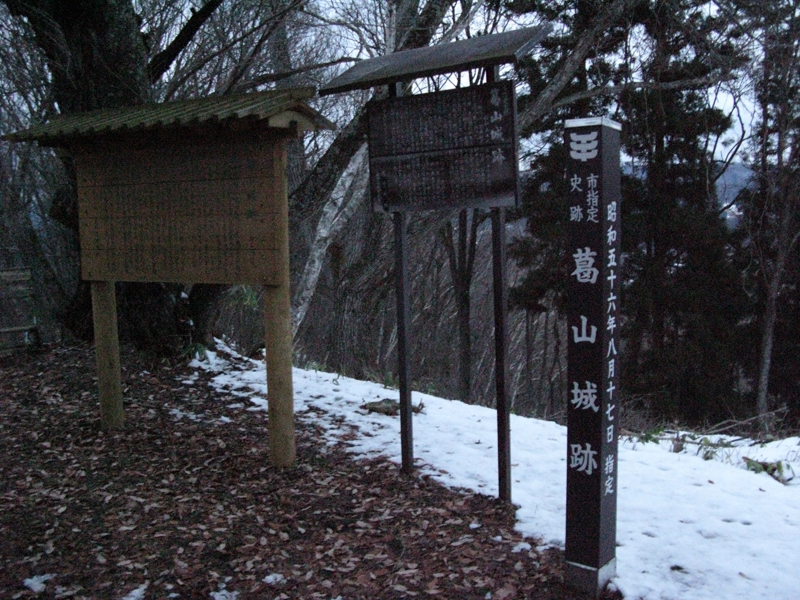
- Trailhead to the ruined Katsurayama castle
Date	March 1557
Location	Katsurayama Castle, northern Shinano Province, Japan
Result	Takeda victory: Entire castle garrison killed, Katsurayama castle destroyed

Belligerents
forces of Takeda Shingen	forces of Uesugi Kenshin

Commanders and leaders
Baba Nobuharu	Ochiai Haruyoshi †

Units involved
Takeda clan	Ochiai clan; Murakami clan

Strength
6,000 samurai and ashigaru	Unknown

Casualties and losses
Heavy	Total

The siege of Katsurayama in March 1557 was fought between the forces of the Japanese daimyō Takeda Shingen and Uesugi Kenshin as part of the Kawanakajima campaigns. Katsurayama Castle was a strategically vital Uesugi stronghold in the contested Shinano Province and, when it was isolated from reinforcements due to late snow in early 1557, the Takeda clan used this opportunity to attack it. Although the castle garrison, consisting of the Ochiai clan and elements of the Murakami clan, defended Katsurayama furiously, the Takeda forces under Baba Nobuharu eventually stormed into the castle. Most of the garrison was killed in combat, while the families of the defenders committed mass suicide and the castle was burned to the ground.

== Background ==
Shinano Province, the site of the Siege of Katsurayama

Before the 1550s, Shinano Province had acted as buffer between the powerful Takeda and Uesugi clans whose strongholds were located to its south (Kai Province) and north (Echigo Province) respectively. In 1542, however, Takeda Shingen launched a campaign to conquer Shinano, and by 1550 he controlled most of the province's south and center and also directly threatened the Uesugi in Echigo. Uesugi Kenshin consequently advanced into Shinano in order to halt Takeda Shingen's expansionism, resulting in a military conflict between the two that lasted years. The initial confrontations between the rival daimyōs in 1553–1555 on the Kawanakajima plain in Shinano were inconclusive, however, so Takeda Shingen decided to focus on a new objective in 1557. Instead of fighting the Uesugi along the Chikumagawa River as he had done so far, he would secure the mountain passes that went from the Kawanakajima plain west to Togakushi, from where he could circumvent and cut off the castles of Iiyama and Takanashi, and then strike into Echigo. In order to take control of the passes up to Togakushi, however, the Takeda first needed to eliminate the Uesugi fortress of Katsurayama, which Kenshin had built in 1553. Katsurayama castle thus became the new primary target for the Takeda forces.

Katsurayama was a Japanese mountain castle typical of its time. Built using wood on a mountain peak west of Zenkō-ji and north of the Susohanagawa river, it was a well defensible fortress. Relatively small, it had a circular, wooden wall and a strong gatehouse as well as watchtowers. Its garrison consisted of the Ochiai clan and some troops of the Murakami clan, long-standing enemies of the Takeda. The overall commander of Katsurayama was Ochiai Haruyoshi, also known as Ochiai Bitchu no kami, a samurai from Saku who was determined to defend his castle at all costs. Despite this, the castle reportedly had one major weakness: while well stocked on food supplies, it lacked a source of fresh water within its walls. Katsurayama thus depended on a spring at Joshoji temple on the lower slopes of its mountain for drinking water. The Takeda forces, however, were unaware of this weakness.

== Siege ==
The perfect opportunity to attack Katsurayama came in early 1557, when late snow (Note: The area around Katsurayama is one of the snowiest in all of Japan up to the present day.) made the passes from Echigo into Shinano impassable and thus isolated the castle from Uesugi reinforcements. As a result, a Takeda army of 6,000 samurai and ashigaru under Baba Nobuharu, one of the renowned "Twenty-Four Generals of Takeda Shingen", launched an assault on Katsurayama in March 1557. This attack was effectively "a race against time", as the Uesugi would send reinforcements as soon as the thaw set in and the mountain passes were open again, and so the Takeda had to capture the castle before that could happen.

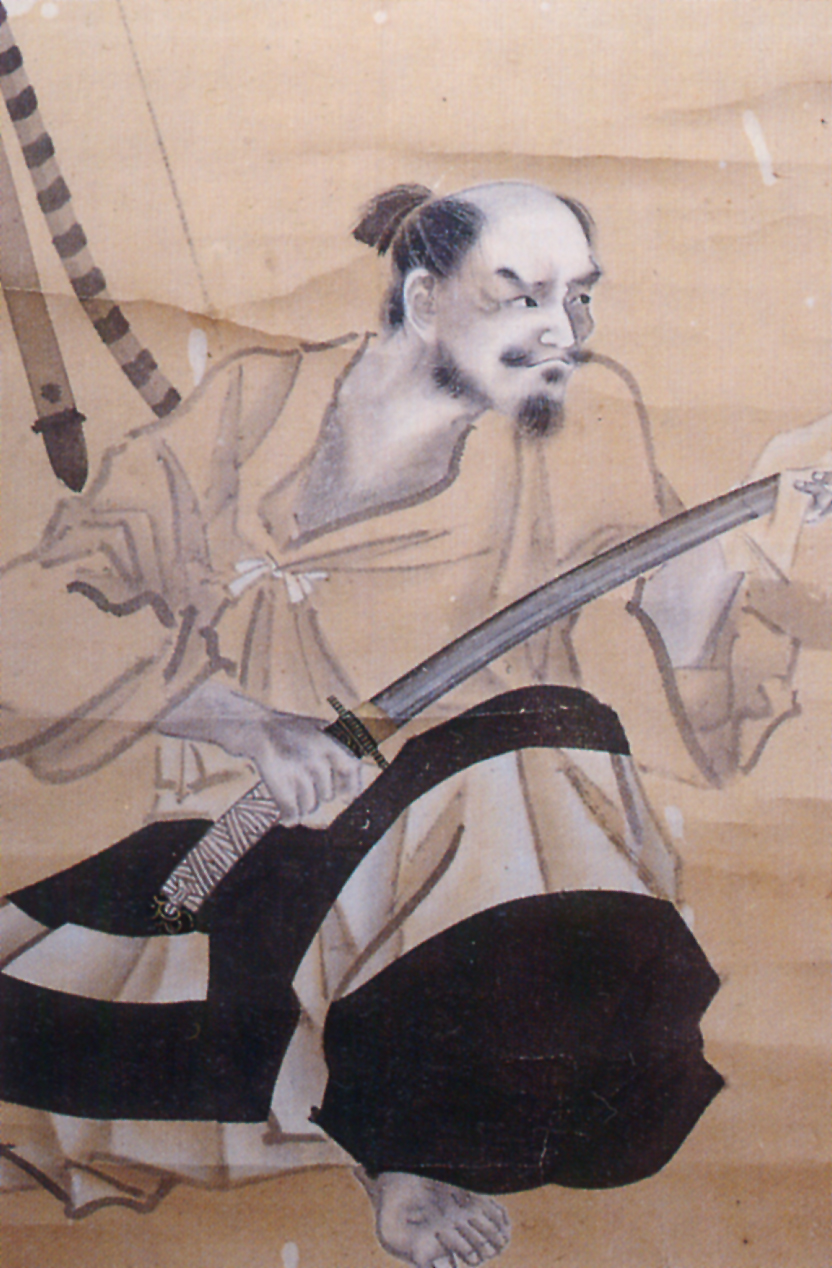
Baba Nobuharu, one of the "Twenty-Four Generals of Takeda Shingen" and commander of the besieging army

Baba Nobuharu's men repeatedly attempted to scale the walls of Katsurayama, but the castle garrison was able to beat off the attacks. The fighting was fierce, leading to heavy casualties on both sides. Historian Stephen Turnbull notes for example the Takeda samurai Chino Yugeinojo who fought in all the Battles of Kawanakajima and accompanying campaigns, collecting eight heads in total; (Note: Japanese samurai traditionally practiced headhunting to prove their achievements in battles, and were accordingly given rewards for the number and rank of slain enemies whose heads they had collected.) of these, he took four at Katsurayama alone. As these initial attacks did not succeed, the Takeda army settled into a siege, though it did not occupy the spring near Joshoji temple. The castle thus remained tenuously supplied with drinking water, but their situation remained precarious. Were the Takeda forces to learn of their low supply of clean drinking water, they would know that the garrison could not possibly hold out long enough for Uesugi reinforcements, providing a major advantage to the besiegers.

According to popular accounts, the Ochiai consequently decided to deceive the Takeda by pouring white rice from the castle walls. The torrent of rice looked like a waterfall from the Takeda lines, thus fooling the besiegers into thinking that the Katsurayama garrison had such ample water supplies that they could waste them in taunting displays. This ruse was uncovered, however, when the chief priest of Joshoji temple told Baba Nobuharu's army that the castle's only source of water was located near his temple. The Takeda troops consequently occupied the spring at Joshoji, thus cutting off the defenders from fresh water. Turnbull notes that this story, though not unlikely, might be legendary and based on accounts of other sieges in Japanese history.

In any case, the Takeda eventually made one final attempt to storm the castle. This time, the attackers managed to set fire to the castle buildings, and thus broke Katsurayama's defenses. Baba Nobuharu's men then launched a final assault, overrunning the last Ochiai and Murakami soldiers who died fighting in a last stand alongside their commander Ochiai Haruyoshi. With the majority of the castle garrison killed in combat, the wives, female attendants and children of the defenders committed mass suicide by jumping off the mountain cliffs. Katsurayama castle was burned down completely, ending the "long and desperate struggle".

== Aftermath ==
The destruction of Katsurayama castle allowed the Takeda forces to advance into the mountains, where they captured Nagahama castle on the borders of Echigo. Nagahama controlled one of the crucial passes into Uesugi-held lands and also allowed the Takeda to seize the nearby Togakushi Shrine, thus boosting both the military situation as well as the morale of the Takeda clan. From there, the Takeda army advanced against Iiyama castle in the east and besieged it. This time, however, the Uesugi army managed to relieve the castle garrison in late April 1557, forcing the Takeda to retreat. Consequent maneuvers by the opposing armies resulted in the Third Battle of Kawanakajima, or Battle of Uenohara, in August/September 1557. More a series of skirmishes than a major confrontation, this battle was inconclusive. Nevertheless, the destruction of Katsurayama and capture of Nagahama furthered Takeda control over Shinano Province, and, when the Takeda–Uesugi conflict was concluded in 1564, the Takeda firmly held almost all of Shinano.

== See also ==
- List of last stands

== Bibliography ==
- Friday, Karl F. (2004). Samurai, Warfare and the State in Early Medieval Japan. London, New York City: Routledge. ISBN 978-0415329637.
- Pöcher, Harald (2009). Kriege und Schlachten in Japan, die Geschichte schrieben: Von den Anfängen bis 1853 [Wars and battles in Japan that made history: From the beginnings to 1853] (in German). Münster, Berlin, Vienna: LIT Verlag. ISBN 978-3643500823.
- Turnbull, Stephen (2008) [1st pub. 2003]. Kawanakajima 1553–64. Samurai power struggle (4th ed.). Oxford: Osprey Publishing. ISBN 978-1-84176-562-4.
