= Siege of Musashi-Matsuyama (1537) =

- Part of the Sengoku period
Date	1537
Location	Matsuyama Castle, Musashi province 36.0375°N 139.42056°E
Result	Siege successful, castle falls to Hōjō

Belligerents
Uesugi clan garrison	Hōjō forces

Commanders and leaders
Uesugi Tomooki; Nanbada Norishige	Hōjō Ujitsuna; Hōjō Genan; Hōjō Tsunashige

Strength
	7,000 men

The 1537 siege of Musashi-Matsuyama was the first of several sieges of Matsuyama castle in Japan's Musashi province over the course of the Sengoku period (1467-1603). The Uesugi clan controlled the castle in 1537, but lost it to the Hōjō clan in this siege; they would regain it, and lose it once more in 1563.

The Uesugi sent for help during this siege by hiding a message inside a dog's collar; the tactic was ultimately unsuccessful.
