= Siege of Edo =

Siege of Edo Castle in Japan

- Part of the Sengoku period
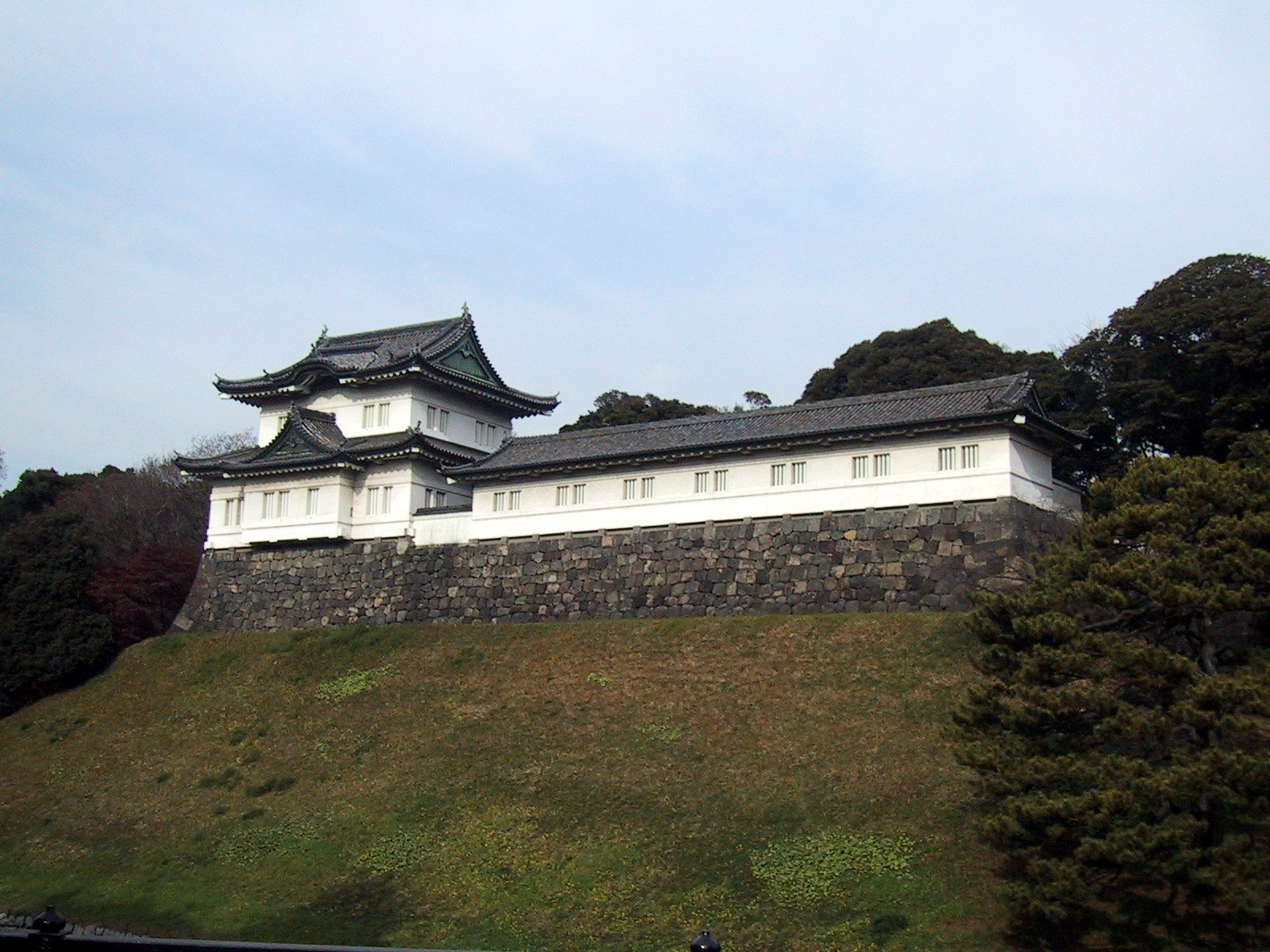
- Fushimi tower of Edo castle (now the Imperial Palace)
Date	January 1524
Location	Edo castle, modern-day Tokyo
Result	Hōjō victory

Belligerents
Hōjō Clan	Uesugi Clan

Commanders and leaders
Hōjō Ujitsuna; Hōjō Genan	Uesugi Tomooki; Ōta Suketaka

In the 1524 Siege of Edo, also known as the Battle of Takanawahara (高輪原の戦い), the Hōjō, led by Hōjō Ujitsuna, besieged Edo castle, which was held by Uesugi Tomooki. Though Edo has since become the Japanese metropolis of Tokyo, it was then a more or less insignificant fishing village in the Kantō region.

== Siege ==
Eager to repel the attackers, Uesugi Tomooki led his warriors out of the castle to meet the Hōjō in battle at the Takanawa river crossing. However, Ujitsuna led his men around the Uesugi force and attacked them from the rear. Retreating to his castle, Tomooki found that the commander of his garrison, Ōta Suketaka, had betrayed him and opened the gates to the Hōjō.

== Aftermath ==
The battle marked the beginning of a seventeen-year struggle between the Hōjō clans and Uesugi clans for dominance of the Kantō.
