= Battle of Tatarahama (1336) =

- Part of the Nanboku-chō Wars
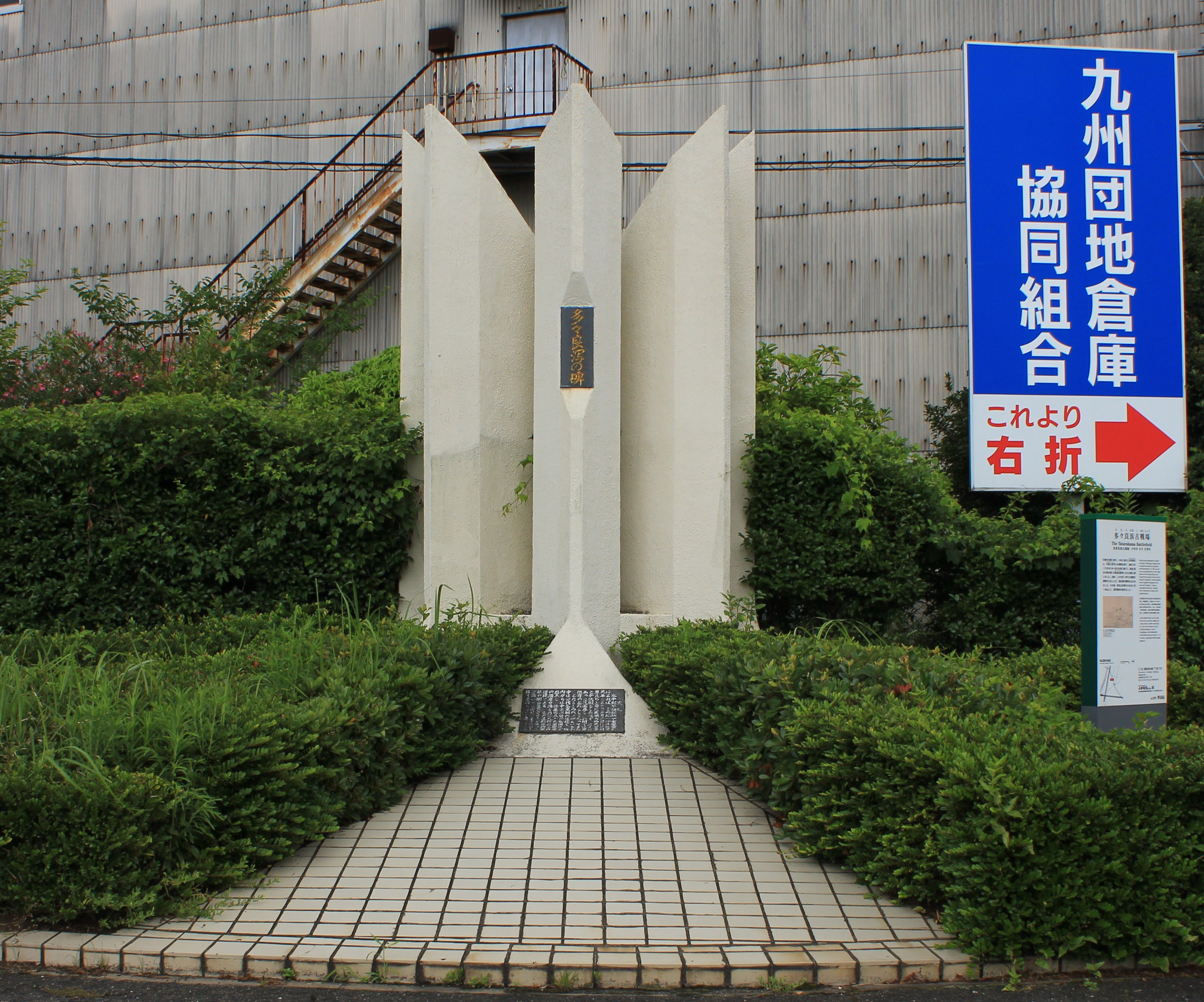
- Tatarahama Battlefield
Date	14 April 1336
Location	Tatarahama, on Hakata Bay, Fukuoka, Japan 33°37′41″N 130°26′42″E
Result	Shogunate victory
Territorial changes	Kyūshū falls to Northern Imperial Court

Belligerents
Ashikaga shogunate	Imperial loyalists

Commanders and leaders
Ashikaga Takauji	Kikuchi Taketoshi
- Location within Japan

The 1336 battle of Tatarahama (多々良浜の戦い, Tatarahama no tatakai) was one of many battles constituting the Nanboku-chō Wars in Japan, in which two rival Imperial Courts battled for legitimacy and control of the country. It was decisive in securing control of the island of Kyūshū for the Northern Imperial Court, which was closely connected to the Ashikaga shogunate.

== Prelude ==
Early in 1336, a number of Kyūshū clans, anticipating the movements of the shōgun's army against them, made efforts to unite and present a formidable resistance. A number of skirmishes were fought against clans loyal to the shōgun on the island, including a siege of Dazaifu, in which the Shōni clan stronghold was taken. Shōni Sadatsune fled, but was defeated soon afterwards, and committed suicide along with a number of his retainers.

Shōgun Ashikaga Takauji, arriving in Munakata, a short distance away, at this time in early April, learned of the siege of Dazaifu and the death of Shōni Sadatsune. Gathering forces, he marched from Munakata on April 15, and journeyed to Tatarahama, fifteen miles (24 km) away, where he met the Kikuchi clan army. This army included Aso, Mihara, and Kuroki, all under the command of Kikuchi Taketoshi.

== Battle ==
The military chronicle Baishō-ron describes Tatarahama as "a stretch of over three miles (4.8 km) of dry foreshore, crossed at the south end by a small stream. The precincts of the Hakozaki Hachiman Shrine consist of some five square miles of pine forest. To the south lies the city of Hakata, on the east five or six miles distant is hilly country, and to the west is the open sea stretching as far as China."

By the end of the battle, the Kikuchi clan forces had been chased by Ashikaga Tadayoshi to Dazaifu, at which point they fled into the hills. The Aso and Akizuki clan commanders committed suicide, and other commanders simply surrendered.

Takauji rewarded his commanders for their bravery and service, but offered pardon to his opponents, and to several clans not participating in the battle, who thus joined him in its aftermath. Kyūshū thus became united under the shogunate, and the Northern Imperial Court.

== See also ==
- Battle of Tatarahama (1569)
