= Battle of Kizugawa =

Battle of the Kizugawa
- Part of the siege of Osaka
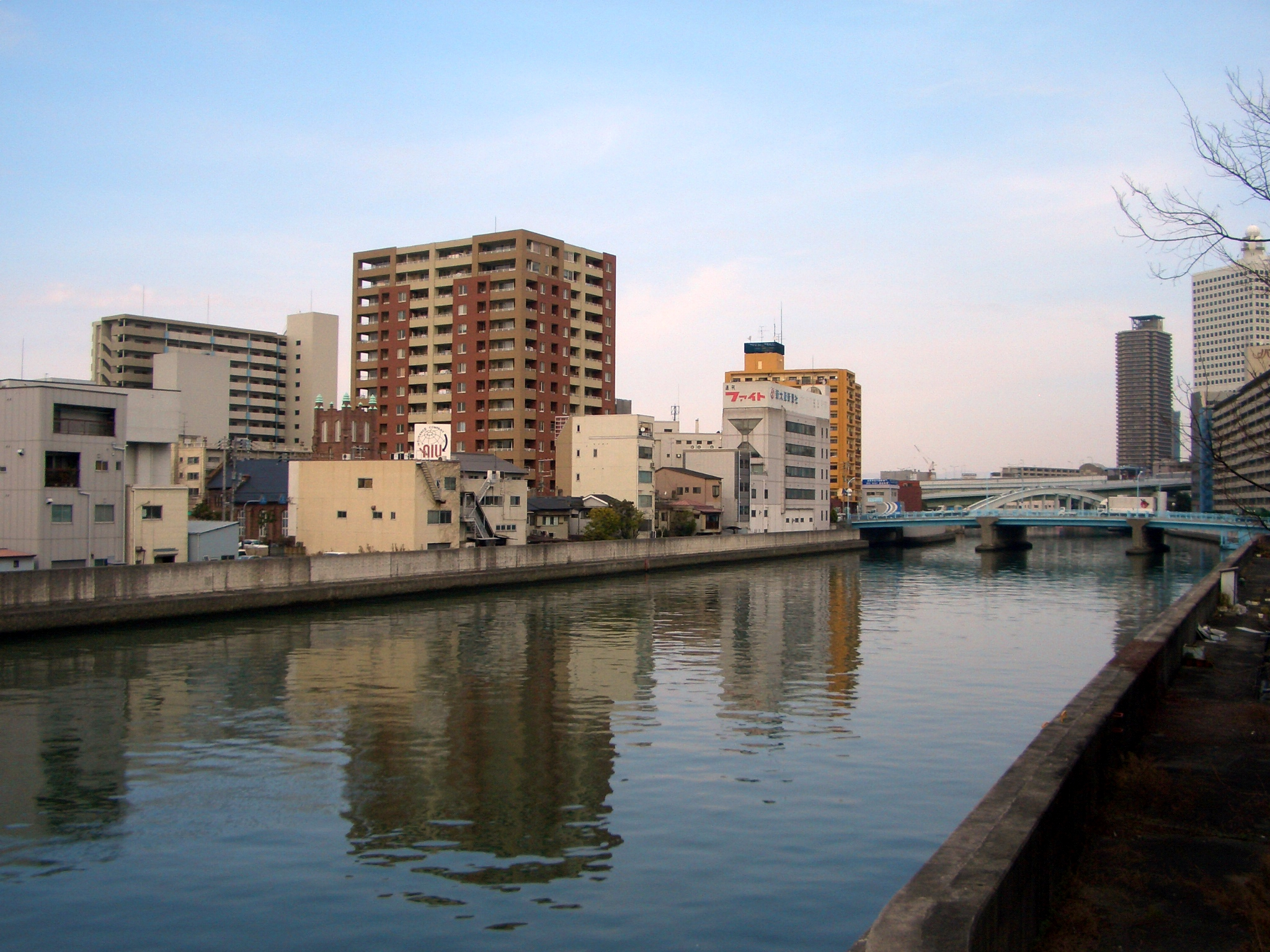
- The Kizugawa today
Date	November 29, 1614
Location	Kizu River, near Osaka, Japan
Result	Tokugawa victory

Belligerents
Tokugawa shogunate	Toyotomi clan

Commanders and leaders
Ishikawa Tadafusa; Hachisuka Yoshishige	Unknown

Strength
2,300+	Unknown

The 1614 battle of the Kizugawa(木津川の戦い) was one of a number of battles surrounding the siege of Osaka, in which the Tokugawa shogunate destroyed the Toyotomi clan, the last major opposition to its control of Japan.

A fortress loyal to the Toyotomi controlled a section of the Kizu River (Kizugawa) near Osaka. After a shogunal reconnaissance mission, a pair of amphibious assaults were launched to seize it. Ishikawa Tadafusa led 2300 men across the river on boats from the west while other groups under the command of Hachisuka Yoshishige attacked from the south and east.

The assaults were successful, and the fortress fell to the Tokugawa forces.
