= Siege of Kamakura (1526) =

1526 siege

- Part of the Sengoku period
| Date | December 1526 |
| Location | Kamakura, Kanagawa |
| Result | Uesugi victory |

Belligerents
| Uesugi clan | Hōjō clan Itō family Ogasawara family |

Commanders and leaders
| Satomi Sanetaka | Various retainers of Hōjō Ujitsuna |

In the 1526 siege of Kamakura (大永鎌倉合戦; "Daiei (era) Battle of Kamakura"), Satomi Sanetaka led forces of the Uesugi clan against the Hōjō, who had taken Edo from the Uesugi two years earlier. The city was defended by a number of retainers of Hōjō Ujitsuna, including members of the Itō and Ogasawara families.

The Uesugi forces burned much of the city to the ground, including Tsurugaoka Hachiman-gū. This was a terrible psychological loss for the Hōjō, since the earlier Hōjō clan, from which they took their name, had suffered their final defeat at the same location in 1333.

== See also ==
- Siege of Kamakura (1333)
