= Battle of Tatarahama (1569) =

- Part of the Sengoku period
Date	1569
Location	Tatarahama, on Hakata Bay, Fukuoka, Japan 33°37′41″N 130°26′35″E
Result	Ōtomo victory

Belligerents
Ōtomo clan	Mōri clan

Commanders and leaders
Ōtomo Sōrin; Tachibana Dōsetsu; Usuki Akisumi; Yoshihiro Akimasa	Mōri Motonari; Kikkawa Motoharu; Kobayakawa Takakage
- Location within Fukuoka Prefecture Battle of Tatarahama (1569) (Japan)

The 1569 Battle of Tatarahama was part of the struggles between the Ōtomo and Mōri samurai clans during Japan's Sengoku period, for control of the island of Kyūshū.

== Battle ==
The battle took place in the aftermath of a successful siege by the Mōri of the Ōtomo's Tachibana castle, which sat just outside the boundaries of today's Fukuoka City.

The two armies met on the shores of Hakata Bay, at Tatarahama, but were evenly matched, and both retreated.

In order to end the deadlock, the Ōtomo made an alliance with the Amago clan. The Mōri clan's battles with this larger allied force occupied it to such an extent that Yamanaka Yukimori and Amago Katsuhisa, as part of their arrangement with the Ōtomo, were able to take Izumo province, some distance away on Honshū, and that the Mōri became pressured into abandoning Tachibana.

== See also ==
- Battle of Tatarahama (1336)
- Siege of Tachibana
