= Battle of Kōnodai (1538) =

1st Battle of Kōnodai
- Part of the Sengoku period
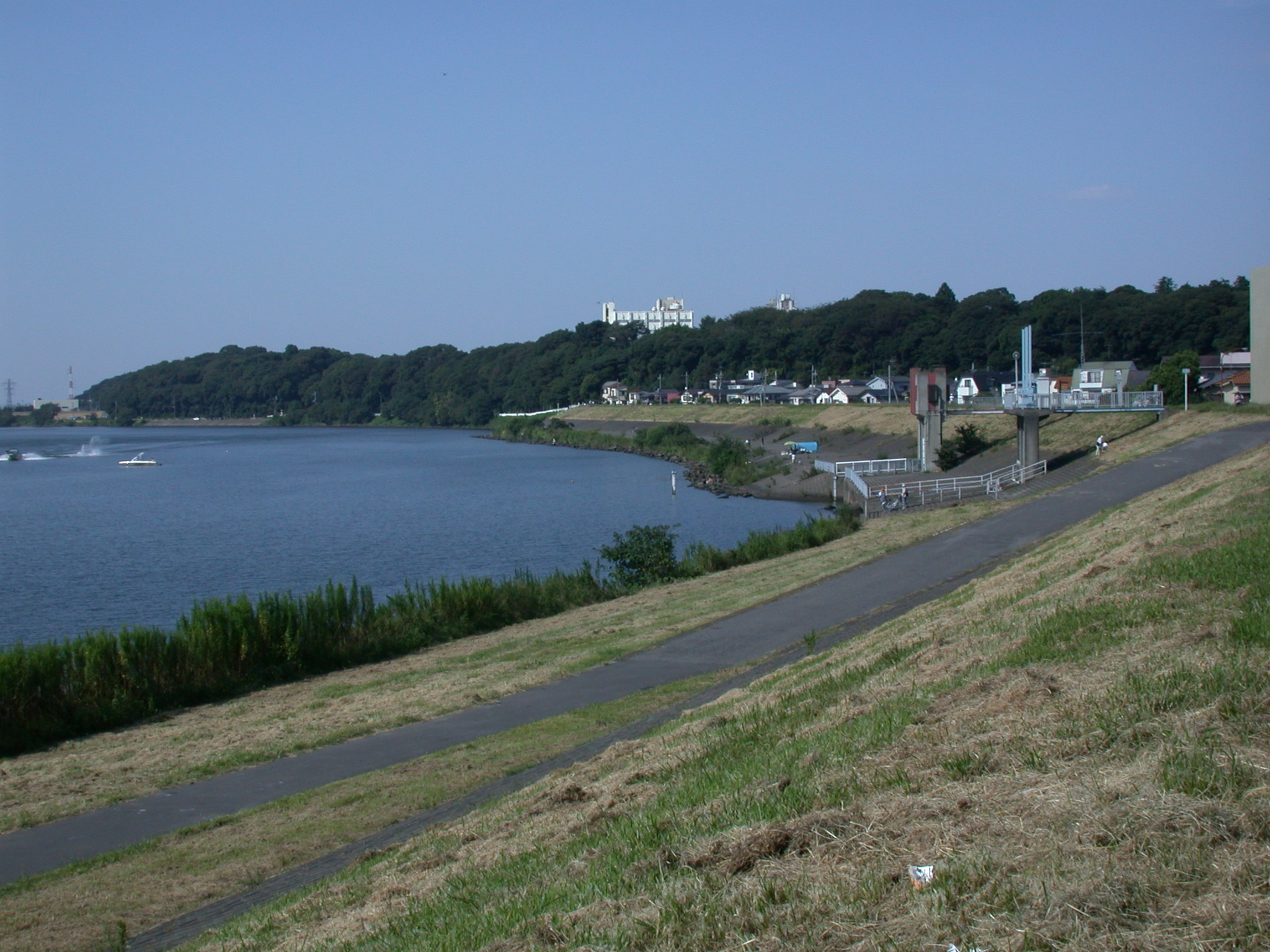
- Kōnodai
Date	1538
Location	Kōnodai, Shimōsa Province 35°47′01″N 139°54′15″E
Result	Hōjō victory

Belligerents
Hōjō forces	Satomi and Ashikaga forces

Commanders and leaders
Hōjō Ujitsuna; Hōjō Genan; Hōjō Tsunashige	Satomi Yoshitaka; Ashikaga Yoshiaki (Oyumi) †
- Location within Japan

The 1538 battle of Kōnodai took place during the Sengoku period of Japanese history, fought by the leader of the Hōjō, Hōjō Ujitsuna, against the combined forces of Satomi Yoshitaka and Ashikaga Yoshiaki (Oyumi). After a long-fought battle between the Hōjō and the allied forces, Ujitsuna emerged as the victor. During the battle Yoshiaki died.
