= Date Nariyoshi =

Japanese samurai and daimyo (1798–1828)

- 伊達斉義
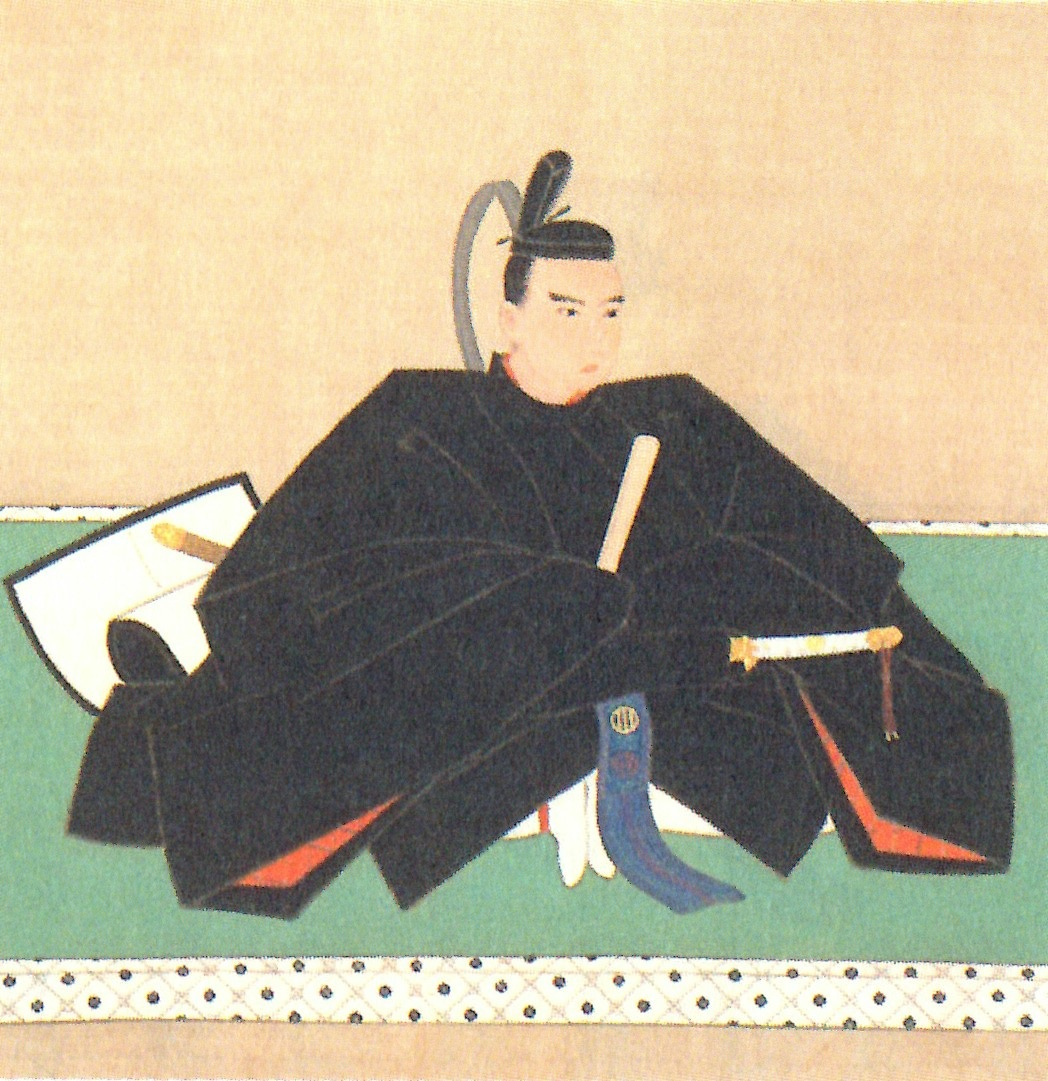
- Portrait of Date Nariyoshi at Sendai City Museum

11th Daimyō of Sendai Domain
- In office 1819–1828
- Monarch: Shōgun: Tokugawa Ienari
- Preceded by: Date Narimune
- Succeeded by: Date Narikuni

Personal details
- Born: April 22, 1798 Edo, Japan
- Died: January 13, 1828 (aged 29)
- Spouse(s): Saihime, daughter of Date Narimune
- Parent: Tamura Murasuke (father)

Date Nariyoshi (伊達斉義; DAH-tay; 22 April 1798 – 13 January 1828) was a mid-Edo period Japanese samurai, and the 11th daimyō of Sendai Domain in the Tōhoku region of northern Japan, and the 27th hereditary chieftain of the Date clan.

== Biography ==
Nariyoshi was the grandson of Date Yoshimura, the 5th daimyō of Sendai and he was the 4th son of Tamura Murasuke, the daimyō of Ichinoseki Domain. He was born in Edo, and his childhood name was Kichigorō (吉五郎). Shortly after his birth, his father retired, and turned the domain over to Tamura Muneaki.

In 1812, he underwent his genpuku ceremony and took the name of Tamura Akiyoshi. Tamura Muneaki declined to adopt him as heir as expected, and although the young Akiyoshi was sent to Ichinoseki, he was not given any official title or duties. A turning point came in 1819, when he was called to Aoba Castle. The sudden death of Date Narimune without an heir placed Sendai Domain in a very precarious position vis-a-vis the Tokugawa shogunate. Date Narimune, and his predecessor, Date Chikamune, had both died without heirs and the shogunate had taken extraordinary measures to ensure the continuation of the Date line; however, a third instance in such a short period of time placed the domain in danger of attainder. Akiyoshi was betrothed to Narimune's three-year-old daughter, Shiba-hime, and took the name of Date Muneyoshi. He was proclaimed 11th Date daimyō of Sendai, and was received in formal audience by Shōgun Tokugawa Ienari three months later. During this audience, he was granted a kanji from Ienari's name to become Date Nariyoshi. He was granted the Court rank of Junior Fourth, Lower Grade and courtesy title of Mutsu-no-kami.

In 1826, he formally wed Shiba-hime, but died less than two years later in Edo. His death reopened the succession issue within Sendai Domain, as his son and heir was still a child.

== Family ==
- Tamura Murasuke (father)
- Wakisaka Yasuchika's daughter (mother)
- Shibahime (wife)
- Omiyo no Kata (concubine)
  - 1st son: Date Kaimaru, disinherited
  - 1st daughter: Masahime (1824–1861), married Date Narikuni, daimyo of Sendai Domain
  - 2nd daughter: Yukihime, married Date Kunizane of the hatamoto Watari-Date clan
- Tsuneko no Kata (concubine)
  - Date Yoshikuni, daimyo of Sendai Domain
