= Date Narikuni =

- 伊達斉邦
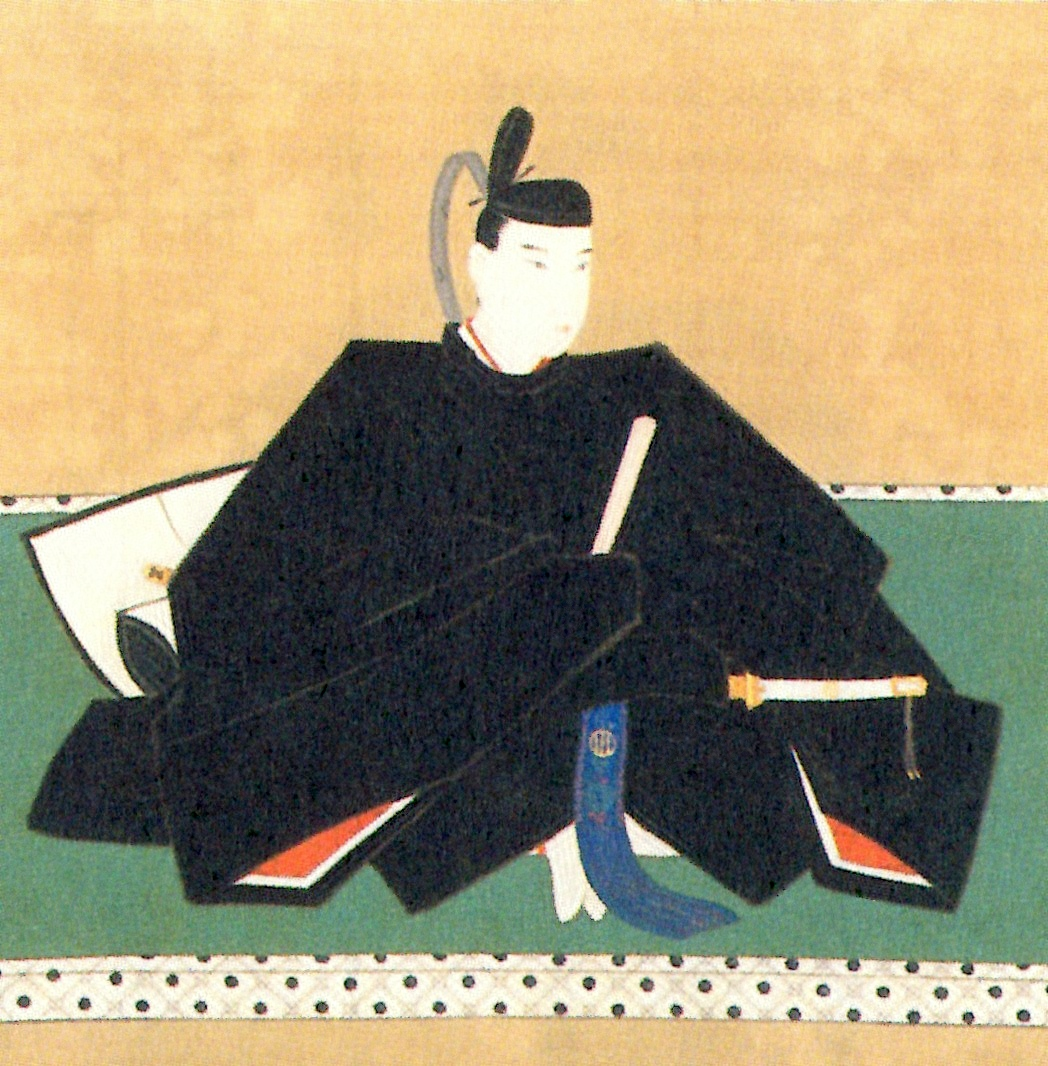
- Portrait of Date Narikuni at Sendai City Museum

12th Daimyō of Sendai Domain
- In office 1827–1841
- Monarchs: Shōgun: Tokugawa Ienari; Tokugawa Ieyoshi
- Preceded by: Date Nariyoshi
- Succeeded by: Date Yoshikuni

Personal details
- Born: November 6, 1817 Tome, Miyagi, Japan
- Died: September 9, 1841 (aged 23) Edo, Japan
- Spouse(s): Masahime, daughter of Date Nariyoshi
- Parent: Date Munemitsu (father)

Date Narikuni (伊達斉邦; DAH-tay; 6 November 1817 – 9 September 1841) was an late-Edo period Japanese samurai, and the 12th daimyō of Sendai Domain in the Tōhoku region of northern Japan, and the 28th hereditary chieftain of the Date clan.

== Biography ==
Narikuni was the son of Date Munemitsu of the Tome-Date clan, a subsidiary branch of the main Date clan, and was the grandson of Date Yoshimura, the 5th daimyō of Sendai. His childhood name was Kōgorō (幸五郎) later Tosaburō (藤三郎) and become Sojirō (総次郎).

In 1828, with the death of Date Nariyoshi, Sendai Domain faced a major crisis. His son, the future Date Yoshikuni was only two-years-old. The Tokugawa shogunate had taken extraordinary measures to ensure the continuation of the Date line in the case of his predecessors Date Chikamune and Date Narimune; however, the patience of Shōgun Tokugawa Ienari had worn thin over Sendai Domain succession problems, and the domain faced the possibility of attainder. The rōjū, Mizuno Tadaakira, initially proposed a solution whereby Nariyoshi’s 4-year-old daughter, Masahime would be married to a son of Tokugawa Ienari; however, negotiations did not proceed and instead she married Date Narikuni, from one of cadet houses of the Date clan. Date Narikuni would then adopt the infant Date Yoshikuni as his heir. Events went as planned and in 1828 Narikuni received Court rank of Junior Fourth, Lower Grade and the courtesy title of Mutsu-no-kami. His ranks were raised to Junior Fourth, Upper Grade and Sakonoe-chūshō in 1831.

Narikuni was noted for his scholarly disposition and knowledge of literature. However, during the sankin-kōtai to Edo in 1840 he fell ill, and died in Edo the following year at the age of 25.

== Family ==
- Father: Date Munemitsu (1787–1843)
- Mother: Tsuneko-hime
- Wife: Masahime (1824–1861)
