= Rusu clan =

Japanese clan of the Tōhoku region

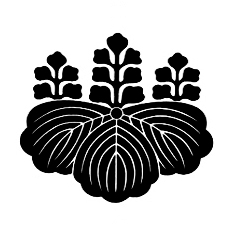
The emblem (mon) of the Rusu clan

The Rusu clan (留守氏, Rusu-shi) were a Japanese clan of the Tōhoku region of the island of Honshu. They were associated with the Sendai Domain.

== History ==
The clan claimed descent from Fujiwara Kaneie's son Michikane.

They assumed the name Rusu following Minamoto no Yoritomo's conquest of northern Japan; the family, then named Isawa, were entrusted with keeping watch in the north during Yoritomo's absence (rusu (留守) being the Japanese word for "absence"). In the 14th century Nanboku-chō period, the family joined the forces of Kitabatake Akiie and fought with distinction at Tsugaru and Shirakawa. However, in 1336, the family switched sides while on campaign in Mikawa Province, and instead fought for the northern court's side. Soon after, they also became involved in the Kan'nō War in 1351.

The Rusu family became established at Takamori Castle by the 16th century, and were supported by the Date clan. The Rusu and Date also formed kinship ties through marriage and adoption. Relations between the Rusu and Date continued to improve, and in the Edo period, the Rusu became samurai of the Date clan's Sendai Domain. The Rusu family also assumed the Date surname in the Edo period, and ruled Mizusawa, a sub-domain of Sendai. The family ranked as ichimon (一門), relatives of the Date lord, in the Sendai domain's retainer ranking structure.

Date Kuninori, who settled Hokkaidō in the early Meiji era, was a descendant of this clan.
