= Muuhime =

Muuhime 牟宇姫
- Born: 1608
- Died: March 17, 1683 (aged 74–75)
- Spouse: Ishikawa Munetaka
- Children: Ishikawa Munehiro; Ishikawa Munenobu; Ishikawa Sadahiro; Chiyotsuruhime; Kahokuhime
- Parent(s): Date Masamune; Oyama-no-Kata
- Relatives: Date Munenobu (brother); Date Munetaka (brother)
- Family: Date clan Ishikawa clan

Muuhime (牟宇姫; 1608 – March 17, 1683) was a member of the Date family and the wife of Ishikawa Munetaka. Her father was Date Masamune, and her mother was his concubine, Oyama-no-Kata.

== Life ==
She was born in Sendai Castle as the second daughter – ninth child overall – of Masamune in 1608, and her mother was the daughter of Shibata Muneyoshi.

On March 25, 1619, at the age of twelve, she was married to Ishikawa Munetaka. During the wedding, Masamune celebrated the Ishikawa family coming to the Sendai house, he stayed overnight and went home the next day. Thereafter, Michitaka Ishikawa was awarded three sons and two daughters – Munehiro, Munenobu, Sadahiro, Chiyotsuruhime, and Kahokuhime.

Masamune would worry about Muuhime, and he would write letters that addressed to her as "Omuu". After Masamune died, Muuhime's mother, Oyama-no-Kata, left Sendai Castle. Muuhime built a mi-dō for her mother, and the latter spent the rest of her life there. In September of 1646, her husband, Michitaka, elected Munehiro's child to lead the Ishikawa clan and retired, living in the rice preservative in the territory.

On September 30, 1668, Oyama-no-Kata died. The following November 20, Munetaka died as well.

On March 17, 1683, Muuhime died at 76. The precept name given to her was Shōjuin Tentokuunjo Daishi (松寿院殿徳雲如高大姉).
