= Date Narimura =

- 伊達斉村
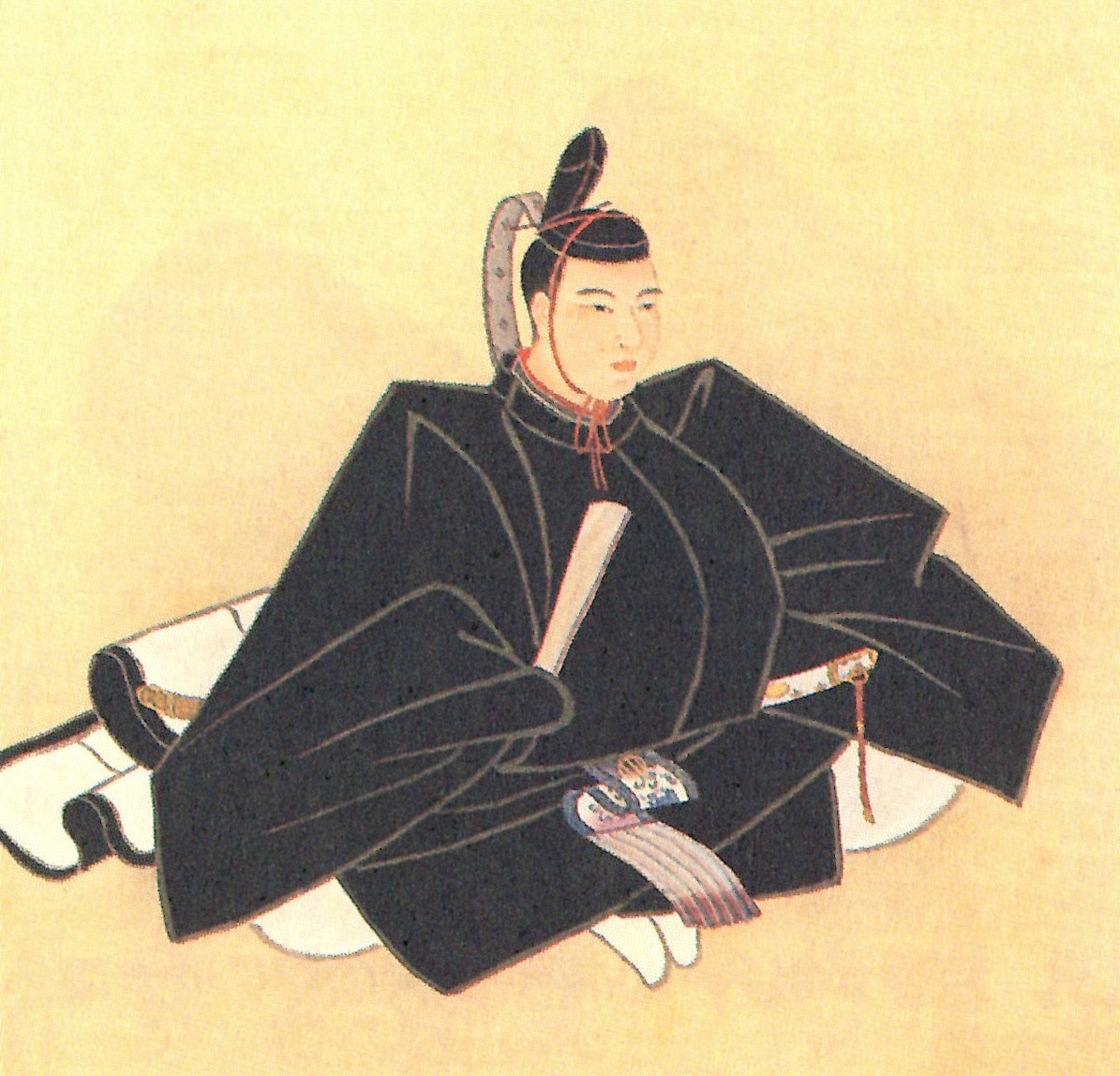
- Portrait of Date Narimura at Sendai City Museum

8th Daimyō of Sendai Domain
- In office 1790–1796
- Monarch: Shōgun: Tokugawa Ienari
- Preceded by: Date Shigemura
- Succeeded by: Date Chikamune

Personal details
- Born: January 6, 1775
- Died: August 29, 1796 (aged 21) Sendai, Japan
- Spouse(s): Nobuko, daughter of Takatsukasa Sukehira
- Parent: Date Shigemura (father)

Date Narimura (伊達斉村; DAH-tay; 6 January 1775 – 29 August 1796) was a mid-Edo period Japanese samurai, and the eighth daimyō of Sendai Domain in the Tōhoku region of northern Japan, and the 24th hereditary chieftain of the Date clan.

== Biography ==
Narimura was the second son of Date Shigemura by a concubine. His childhood name was Shikisaburo (式三郎) later Shojiro (総次郎) later become Date Tokimura, and he became heir on the death of his elder brother in 1783. At the time of his genpuku ceremony in 1787, he received a kanji from Shōgun Tokugawa Ienari and became Date Narimura. He also received court rank of Junior Fourth, Lower Grade and the courtesy titles of Mimasaka-no-kami and Jijū (chamberlain) at that time. In 1790, he became daimyō on the retirement of his father, and his title was changed to Mutsu-no-kami and Sakonoe-shōshō. In 1793, he married the daughter of the kampaku Takatsukasa Sukehira, who was the elder sister of Emperor Kōkaku.

The year 1796 was not a good year for Sendai Domain. Narimura's wife died due to complications in childbirth of his eldest son. Shortly afterwards he received word of his father's death at the clan residence in Edo. On his way back to Sendai after the funeral, he fell ill near Shirakawa, and died shortly after returning home to Aoba Castle at the age of 23.

As his heir Date Chikamune was still an infant and his second son (by a concubine) Date Narimune was still in his mother's womb, the domain took over a week to inform the authorities of Narimura's death, so that they could ensure that Narimune was posthumously recognised as Narimura's official son, and second in the line-of-succession.

== Family ==
- Father: Date Shigemura
- Mother: Ojo no Kata
- Wife: Takatsukasa Nobuko (1775–1796)
  - 1st son: Date Chikamune, daimyo of Sendai Domain
- Concubine: Onobu no Kata (1779–1800)
  - 2nd son: Date Narimune, daimyo of Sendai Domain
