= Moniwa Motonori =

Moniwa Motonori (茂庭 元徳; 1843–1929) was a Japanese samurai of the late Edo period. The son of Moniwa Mototoshi, he served as a retainer of the Date clan of Sendai han. Also known by his common name, Shinsuke (新助), Motonori married the daughter of Moniwa Masumoto, the head of the main house of Moniwa. During the Boshin War, Motonori defended Sendai Castle, and later was dispatched to Komagamine. After the Restoration, he became involved in farming, and in 1889, became the first village mayor of Kashimadai Village, in Miyagi Prefecture (after Kashimadai-chō 鹿島台町 in Shida district, and now a part of Ōsaki City).
