= Koyanagawa Morimune =

15th-century samurai

Koyanagawa Morimune (小梁川 盛宗, 1440 - November 19, 1500) was a Japanese samurai during the Muromachi period. He was the founder of the Koyanagawa clan, a branch of the Date clan.

== Life ==
Date Morimune was born in 1440 as the third son of Date Mochimune, a daimyo (feudal lord) and the 11th head of the Date clan.

According to Date Seishin Kafu, Morimune gathered the Date clan vassals and led all the officials during the time when the 13th clan head, Morimune's nephew, Date Naomune, was aged from 3 to 15 (1455-1467). However, this is considered impossible because not only the elder brother and 12th clan head, Date Narimune, but also Date Mochimune (died in 1469) were still alive at this time.

Later, he founded the Koyanagawa clan, taking its name from Koyanagawa, Date-gun, Mutsu Province.

== Genealogy ==
As the son of Date Mochimune, Morimune descends from Fujiwara no Yamakage's line of the Fujiwara clan's Hokke house through the Date clan.

Morimune's descendants, the Koyanagawa clan, ruled Notezaki, Mutsu Province since the Edo period until the Meiji Restoration in 1867.
