= Date Munemura =

Japanese samurai (1718–1756)

- 伊達宗村
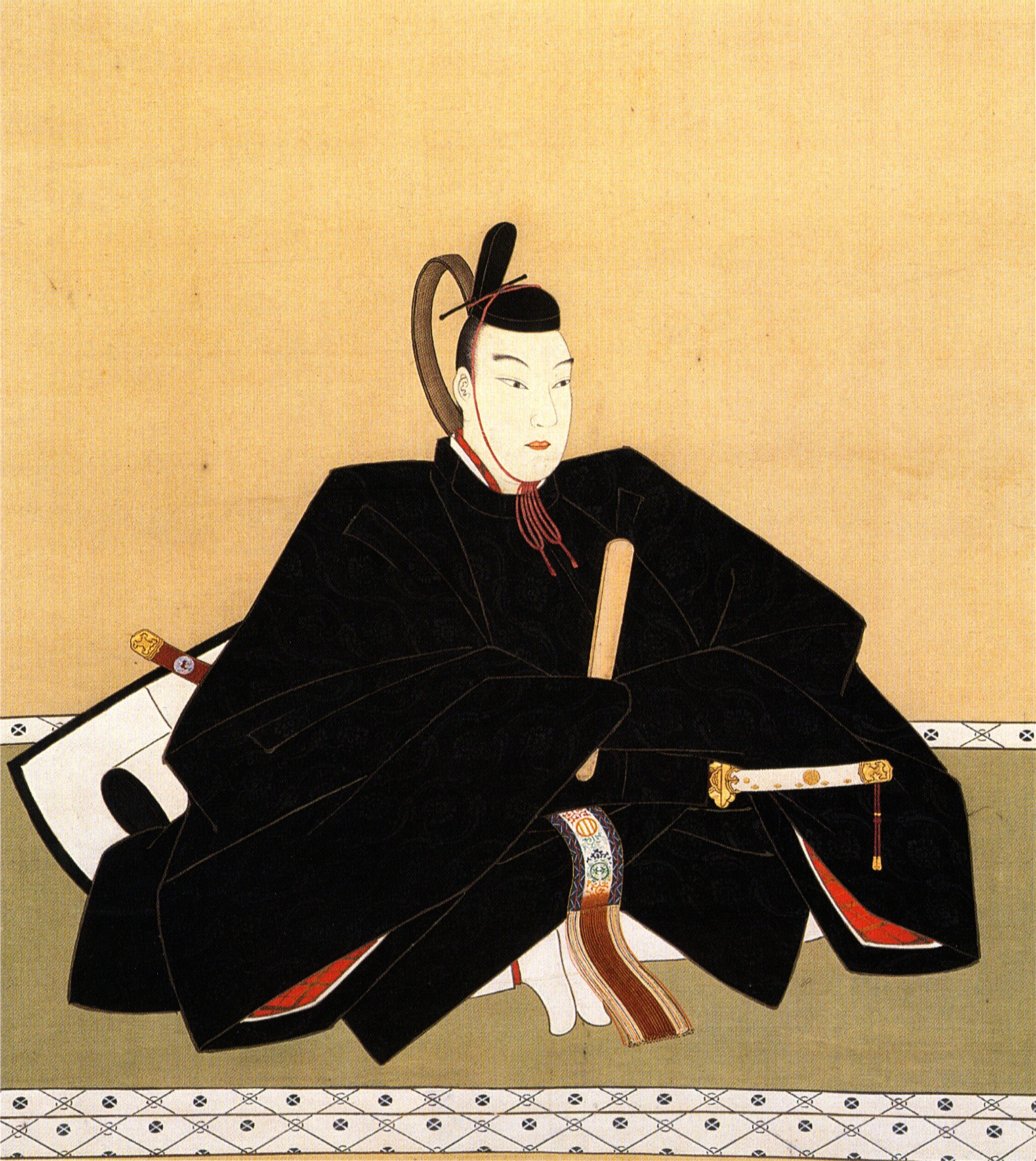
- Portrait of Date Munemura at Sendai City Museum

6th Daimyō of Sendai Domain
- In office 1743–1756
- Monarchs: Shōgun: Tokugawa Yoshimune; Tokugawa Ieshige
- Preceded by: Date Yoshimura
- Succeeded by: Date Shigemura

Personal details
- Born: June 25, 1718
- Died: June 21, 1756 (aged 37)
- Spouse(s): Tone-hime, daughter of Tokugawa Munenao
- Parents: Date Yoshimura (father); Fuyu-hime (mother)

Date Munemura (伊達宗村; DAH-tay; 25 June 1718 – 21 June 1756) was a mid-Edo period Japanese samurai, and the sixth daimyō of Sendai Domain in the Tōhoku region of northern Japan, and the 22nd hereditary chieftain of the Date clan.

== Biography ==
Munemura was the fourth son of Date Yoshimura. Two of his older brothers died young, and the third (Date Murakaze) formed a separate hatamoto household, so he was appointed heir. His childhood name was Date Hisamura (伊達久村); however, when he was received in formal audience by Shōgun Tokugawa Yoshimune, he received one kanji from the shōgun's name, and the thus became Date Munemura. He was also betrothed to the daughter of Tokugawa Munenao, the daimyō of Kii Domain at that time. He became daimyō in 1743 upon the retirement of his father. He was noted as a man of many talents. As was his father, he was noted for his literary achievements, and he was also proficient in horsemanship, swordsmanship, use of the spear, military strategy and hōjutsu (gunnery).

In 1747, Hosokawa Munetaka, daimyō of Kumamoto Domain was cut down by a hatamoto, Itakura Katsukane, while en route to a ceremony at Edo Castle. Katsukane had a vendetta against Itakura Katsukiyo of Annaka Domain, but as the Hosokawa and Itakura family crests are so similar, he killed the wrong man. This placed the Hosokawa clan in danger of attainder, as Munetake was without heir. Date Munemura, who happened to be nearby when the incident occurred, knelt by the corpse of Hosokawa Munetake and loudly declared "he still lives!" and ordered his retainers to take the body to the Hosokawa clan residence before the Shogun's metsuke inspectors could arrive at the scene. This allowed the Hosokawa clan to make a formal announcement that Munetaka had formally adopted his younger brother as heir, and the report on the death of Munetaka was delayed until the following day.

In 1752, Sendai Domain was struck by a severe famine. While touring a stricken village in what is now Watari District, Miyagi on his way back from sankin-kōtai in Edo, he was directly petitioned by the headman of Nakaizumi village, Kitahara Kanehira, for a reduction in the village's taxes. As was the common punishment for such an action, the headman's house and fields were confiscated and he was crucified as punishment,

Munemura died in 1756, and was succeeded by his son, Date Shigemura. His grave is at the Date clan mausoleum at Dainenjiyama in Sendai.

== Family ==
- Father: Date Yoshimura
- Mother: Fuyuhime (1689–1745)
- Wife: Unsho-in (Tonehime) (1717–1746), daughter of Tokugawa Munenao and adopted daughter of Tokugawa Yoshimune
  - 1st daughter: Motohime (1739–1761) married Nabeshima Shigemochi, daimyo of Nabeshima Domain
  - 3rd daughter: unnamed, died in infancy
- Concubine: Nobuko (Osei no Kata) (1719–1763)
  - 1st son: Kumenosuke, died in childhood
  - 2nd son: Date Shigemura, daimyō of Sendai Domain
  - 2nd daughter: Ichihime, died in childhood
  - 4th daughter: Kaihime married Sakai Tadatsura of Obama Domain
  - 5th daughter: Genhime, married Nakamura Kagesada
  - 6th daughter: Naohime, died in childhood
  - 7th daughter: Yorihime, died in childhood
  - 7th son: Date Fujishiro, died in childhood
  - 8th son: Hotta Masaatsu (1755–1832), daimyo of Katata Domain
- Concubine: Oriku no Kata
  - Doi Toshinari (1748–1813), daimyō of Kariya Domain
- Concubine: Otoyo no Kata
  - Date Muratomo (1749–1776), hatamoto head of the Wakuya-Date cadet clan
- Concubine: Odai no Kata
  - 5th son, Date Yukichiyo, died in childhood
- Concubine: Ono no Kata
- Concubine: Okiyo no Kata
  - 6th son: Doi Toshiyasu (1750–1766)
  - 9th daughter: Seihime married Matsudaira Harusato, daimyō of Matsue Domain
- Concubine: Hotoe no Kata (Yuzen-in)
  - 8th daughter: Eihime, died in childhood
  - 11th daughter: Hisahime, died in childhood
  - 12th daughter: Ryuhime, died in childhood
- Concubine: Ishiawa-dono
  - 10th daughter: Saihime, died in childhood
