= Date Muneatsu =

Japanese politician

Senior Third Rank Baron Date Muneatsu
- 伊達 宗敦
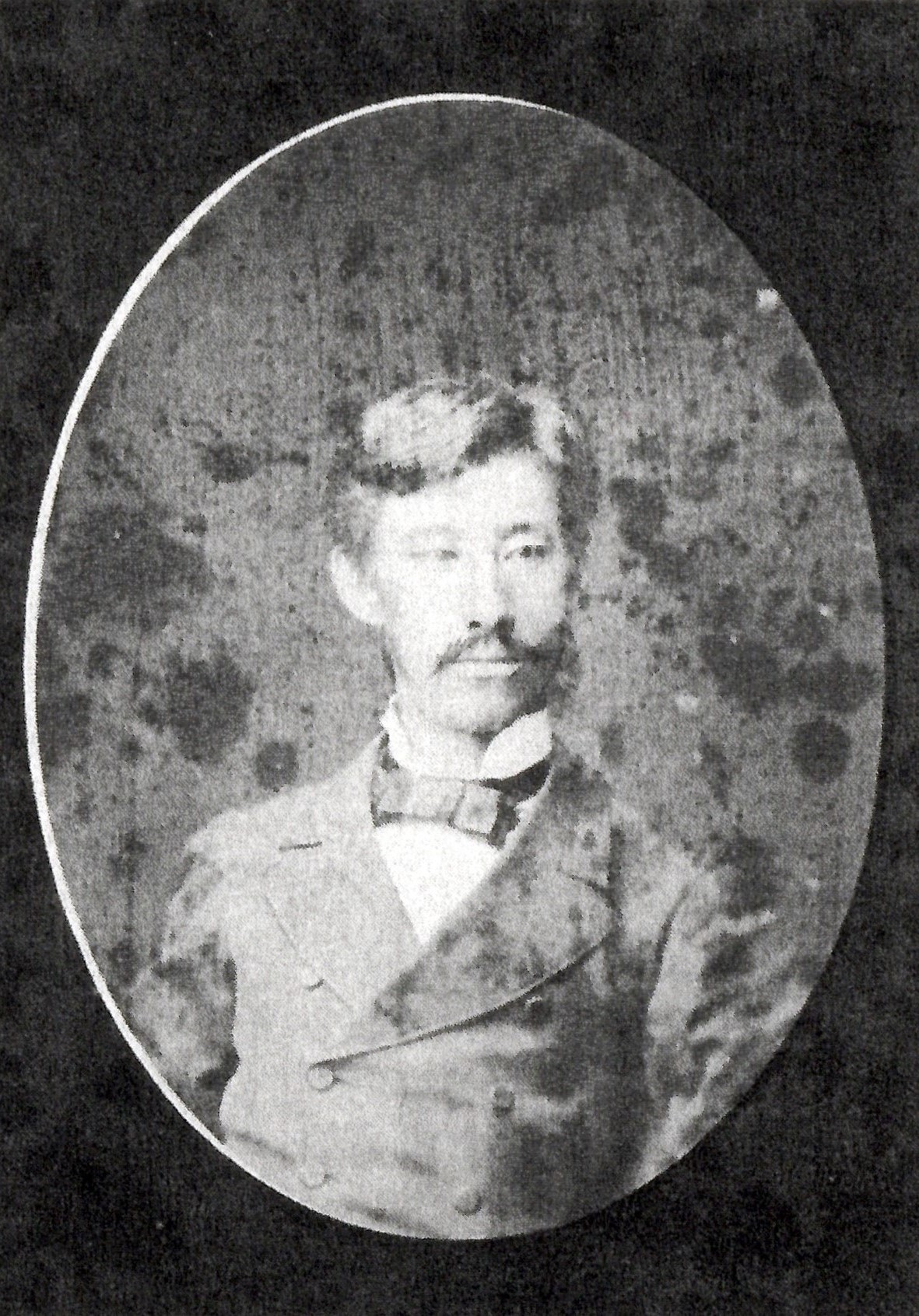
- Portrait of Date Muneatsu

Member of the House of Peers
- In office 10 July 1890 – 6 January 1911 Elected by the Barons

Governor of Sendai Domain
- In office 1870–1871
- Monarch: Meiji
- Preceded by: Date Munemoto
- Succeeded by: Position abolished

Personal details
- Born: 20 June 1852 Uwajima Domain, Japan
- Died: 6 January 1911 (aged 58) Tokyo, Japan
- Parent: Date Munenari (father)

Baron Date Muneatsu (伊達 宗敦; DAH-tay; 20 June 1852 – 6 January 1911) was a Bakumatsu period Japanese samurai, and the second Imperial Governor of former Sendai Domain in the Tōhoku region of northern Japan.

Muneatsu was the second son of Date Munenari, daimyō of Uwajima Domain, and was adopted by Date Yoshikuni in March 1868 as his heir. At that time, he was given the Court rank of Junior Fourth, Lower Grade and courtesy titles of Sakon Daiyu and Jijū. Later that year, Sendai Domain and the Ōuetsu Reppan Dōmei were defeated in the Boshin War of the Meiji Restoration, and Yoshikuni resigned his offices and went into voluntary retirement and seclusion in Tokyo. The new Meiji government ordered that his fourth son, the two-year-old Date Munemoto become daimyō of a much reduced Sendai Domain.

In 1869, the office of daimyō was eliminated by the new government, and Munemoto became Imperial Governor of Sendai: however, as he was still a small child, the government ordered that he be replaced by Muneatsu in 1870. Munemoto retained his position as the hereditary chieftain of the Date clan.

Following the abolition of the han system in 1871, Muneatsu was sent by the Meiji government to England for studies. He remained in England for five years, returning to Japan in February 1875. In 1884, he set up his own household separate from the main Date clan, and on 11 May 1889, was granted the title of danshaku (baron) in the new kazoku peerage system. Starting in July 1890, he served for three terms in the House of Peers in the Diet of Japan.

On 20 June 1900, he was advanced to Third Court Rank. On his death in 1911 at the age of 56, his title went to his son Date Munetsune.

Preceded by Date Muneatsu	2nd Imperial Governor of Sendai; 1870–1871	Succeeded by -none-
