= Date Munemoto =

Samurai and Daimyo

Junior Second Rank Count Munemoto Date
- 伊達 宗基
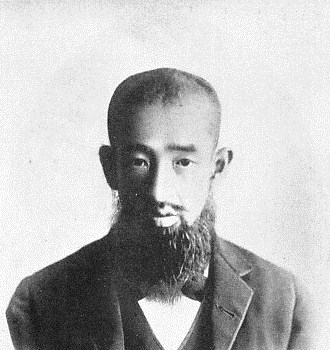

14th Daimyō of Sendai Domain
- In office 1868–1869
- Monarch: Shōgun: Tokugawa Yoshinobu
- Preceded by: Date Yoshikuni
- Succeeded by: -none-

Imperial Governor of Sendai Domain
- In office 1869–1870
- Monarch: Emperor Meiji
- Preceded by: Date Muneatsu
- Succeeded by: -none-

Personal details
- Born: 24 August 1866 Sendai, Japan
- Died: 27 January 1917 (aged 50) Tokyo, Japan
- Spouse(s): Matsura Miyako, daughter of Matsura Akira
- Parent: Date Yoshikuni (father)

Count Munemoto Date (伊達 宗基; DAH-tay; Date Munemoto, 24 August 1866 – 27 January 1917) was a Bakumatsu period Japanese samurai, and the 14th and final daimyō of Sendai Domain in the Tōhoku region of northern Japan, and the 30th hereditary chieftain of the Date clan.

== Biography ==
Munemoto was the second son of Date Yoshikuni. His childhood name was Kamesaburō (亀三郎). In 1868, following the defeat of the Ōuetsu Reppan Dōmei in the Boshin War of the Meiji Restoration, Yoshikuni resigned his offices and went into voluntary retirement and seclusion in Tokyo. The new Meiji government permitted the two-year-old Munemoto to become daimyō of Sendai Domain, but penalized the domain severely for its participation in the rebellion by reducing its kokudaka from 620,000 to 280,000 koku. The actual kokudaka of the reduced Sendai Domain was actually even less, and has been estimated at only 100,000 koku.

In 1869, the office of daimyō was abolished by the new government, and Munemoto was made appointive imperial governor of Sendai. In 1870, he yielded this position to his adoptive brother Date Muneatsu, but retained the post of clan leader.

He was married to the daughter of Matsura Akira, daimyō of Hirado Domain, by whom he had one daughter.

In 1884, Munemoto was created count (hakushaku) in the new Japanese kazoku peerage system. He was advanced to Third Court Rank in 1911 and Second Court Rank in 1917. On his death in 1917, the post of clan chieftain went to his younger brother Date Kunimune.

== Family ==
- Father: Date Yoshikuni
- Mother: Matsuoka Michiko (Okatsu-no-kata)
- Wife: Matsura Kuniko, 3rd daughter of Matsura Akira, daimyō of Hirado Domain
  - 1st daughter: Eiko (1894-1945), married to Count Ueno Masao, 6th son of Prince Kitashirakawa Yoshihisa
