= Date Shigemura =

- 伊達重村
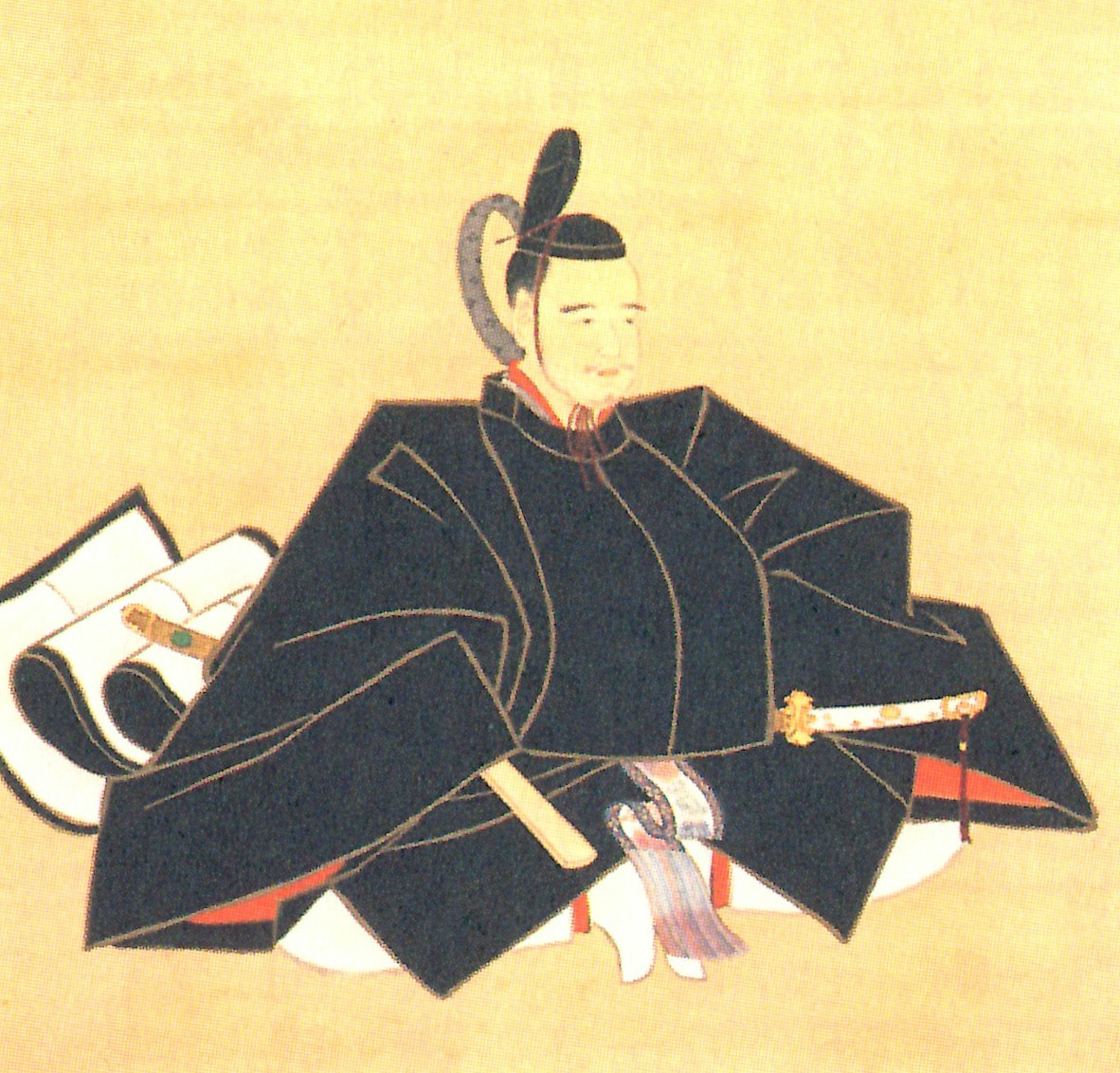
- Portrait of Date Shigemura at Sendai City Museum

7th Daimyō of Sendai Domain
- In office 1759–1790
- Monarchs: Shōgun: Tokugawa Ieshige; Tokugawa Ieharu; Tokugawa Ienari
- Preceded by: Date Munemura
- Succeeded by: Date Narimura

Personal details
- Born: May 23, 1742
- Died: May 27, 1796 (aged 54) Edo, Japan
- Spouse(s): Toshiko, adopted daughter of Konoe Uchisaki
- Parent: Date Munemura (father)

Date Shigemura (伊達重村; DAH-tay; 23 May 1742 – 27 May 1796) was a mid-Edo period Japanese samurai, and the seventh daimyō of Sendai Domain in the Tōhoku region of northern Japan, and the 23rd hereditary chieftain of the Date clan.

== Biography ==
Shigemura was the second son of Date Munemura. His infant name was Gihachirō (儀八郎), and he was renamed Date Kunimura on the death of his elder brother in 1745. At the time of his genpuku ceremony in 1755, he received a kanji from Shōgun Tokugawa Ieshige and thus became Date Shigemura. He became daimyō at the age of 15 the following year, on the death of his father. Due to his youth, the shogunate appointed his uncle, Tamura Murataka of Ichinoseki Domain as his guardian. He inherited a dire situation, in which the domain was suffering from a great famine, finances were in arrears, and there was bitter in-fighting between the various senior retainers.

In 1760, Shigemura married his second cousin, Toshiko, the daughter of the kuge, Hirohata Nakatada, and adopted daughter of the Kampaku Konoe Uchisaki. This year also marked the end of his guardianship, and he was free to start to reform the situation within the domain on his own. However, he was severely sidetracked by an issue over his courtesy title and Court rank. Nominally, Sendai Domain was considered to have the same status in the Shōgun’s court as Kagoshima Domain. In 1764, Shimazu Shigehide, daimyō of Kagoshima, received promotion to Junior Fourth Rank, Senior grade and Sakonoe-gon-chūjō (Lieutenant General of the Left Guards). Unable to abide by being surpassed by Shigehide, who was three years younger, Shigemura was forced to make a tremendous outlay in presents and bribes to shogunal officials to have his courtesy titles and position raised as well. To pay for these expenses, he demanded that his senior retainers accept cuts in their stipends, and those who protested were placed under house arrest. In 1767, he finally achieved promotion, but at the cost of 220,000 ryō.

In 1768, Sendai Domain received an order from the Shogunate to mint iron coins for a seven-year period. Normally, minting was considered a very lucrative task; however, the sudden influx of vast amounts of coinage from Sendai Domain created inflation nationwide, which drove the value of the coinage down. Also, as the traditional copper coinage was considered more valuable than Sendai iron coins despite having the same face value, this caused much confusion in the market. The shogunate intervened in 1772 to cut the contract short; but then relented in 1776 to permit another two years of production, as long as the coins remained within the borders of Sendai.

These antics did nothing to improve on the even worsening financial situation and political in-fighting within the domain. In 1790, Shigemura resigned in favor of his son, and died six years later at the domain's shimoyashiki in Edo.

== Family ==
- Father: Date Munemura
- Mother: Osei no Kata (1719–1763)
- Wife: Toshiko (1745–1808)
  - 1st daughter: unnamed, died in infancy
  - 3rd daughter: Manhime, married Ii Naotomi of Hikone Domain
- Concubine: Osega no Kata
  - 1st son: Date Sosaburo (d. 1787)
- Concubine: Okoto no Kata
  - 2nd daughter: Junhime, married Date Muranaga, daimyō of Uwajima Domain
- Concubine: Osega no Kata
  - 4th daughter: Seihime married Ikeda Harumichi, daimyō of Tottori Domain
  - 5th daughter: Sachihime, married Tsuchiya Hidenao daimyō of Tsuchiura Domain
  - 3rd son: Date Sensaburo, died in childhood
  - 9th daughter: unnamed, died in infancy
- Concubine: Ojo no Kata
  - 2nd son: Date Narimura, daimyō of Sendai Domain
  - 6th daughter: Hohime, died in childhood
- Concubine: Osode no Kata
  - 7th daughter: Meguhime, died in childhood
- Concubine: Odai no Kata
  - 8th daughter: Kazuhime, died in childhood
- Concubine: Oai no Kata
  - 10th daughter: Utsuhime, married Date Murayuki of the hatamoto Tome-Date clan

== In popular culture ==
- The 2016 Japanese jidaigeki samurai comedy film The Magnificent Nine (殿、利息でござる！, Tono, Risoku de Gozaru!) is set in Sendai Domain at the time of Date Shigemura, and refers to the issue of Shigemura's rivalry with Shimazu Shigehide over courtesy titles. Date Shigemura is played by the figure skater Yuzuru Hanyu.
