= Date Kuninori =

Date Kuninori (伊達 邦寧; DAH-tay; 1830 – 1874) was a Japanese samurai of the late Edo period. Kuninori was both the 12th head of the Mizusawa-Date clan and the 26th generation head of the famed Rusu clan, and served as a retainer of the Sendai domain. Known for his good governance, Kuninori amply compensated the people made homeless by the large fire in his holdings at Mizusawa, opening his own stores of food to the public and providing them lumber from domainal holdings for rebuilding their homes. Advising his retainers to be frugal, he had them work for the revival of Mizusawa's town. During the Boshin War, he was sent to Shirakawaguchi in place of his lord, Date Yoshikuni.

Following the war, he moved to the Sapporo district of Hokkaidō, and settled at Hiragishi Village (平岸村, Hiragishi-mura).
