= Sendai City Museum of History and Folklore =

- 仙台市歴史民俗資料館
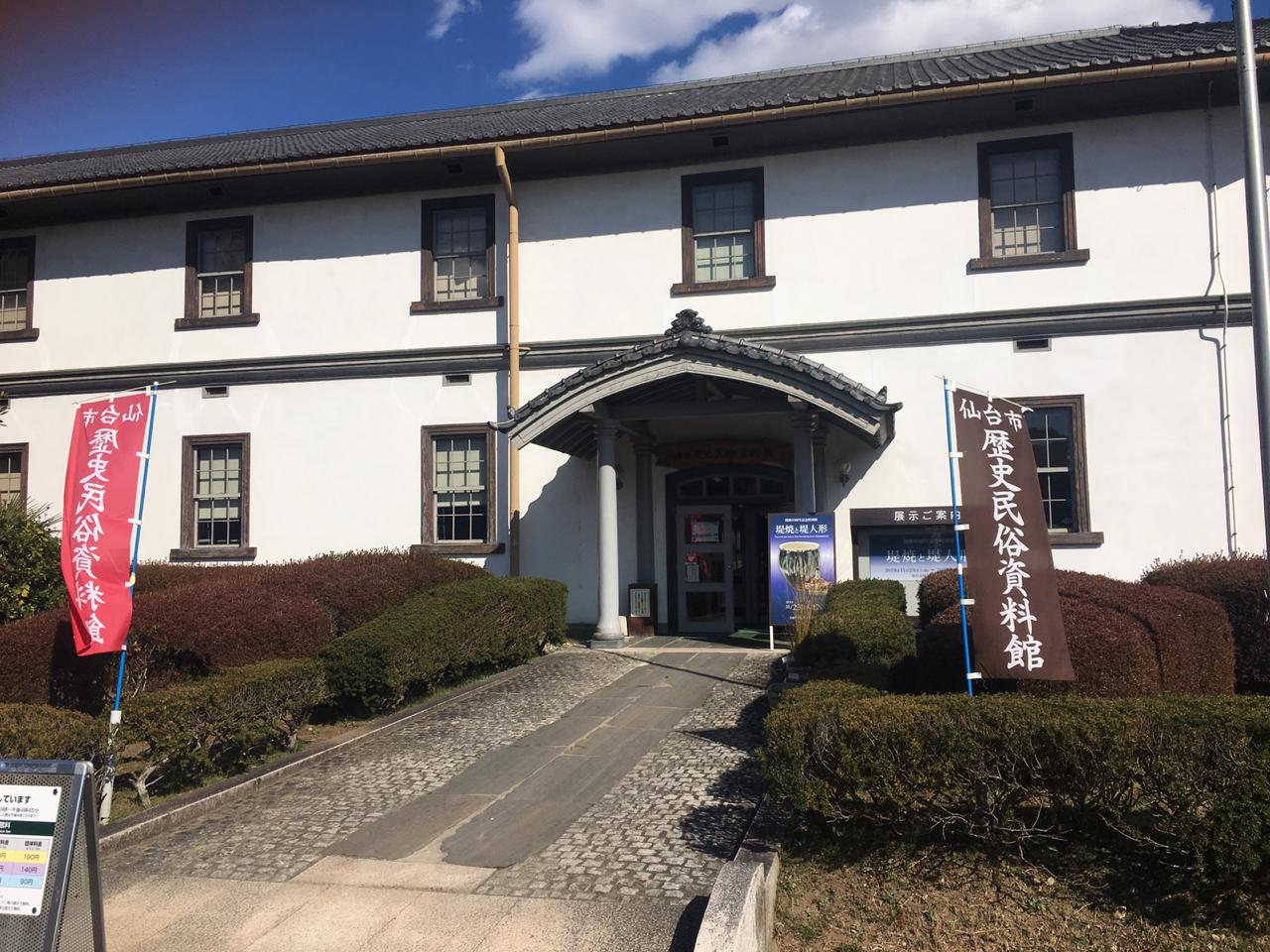
- Interactive map of the Sendai City Museum of History and Folklore area

General information
- Location: 1-3-7 Gorin, Miyagino-ku, Sendai, Miyagi Prefecture, Japan
- Coordinates: 38°15′39″N 140°53′54″E
- Opened: 1979

Website
- Official website (ja)

Sendai City Museum of History and Folklore (仙台市歴史民俗資料館, Sendai-shi Rekishi Minzoku Shiryōkan) opened in Tsutsujigaoka Park, Sendai, Miyagi Prefecture, Japan in 1979. The museum building, the former barracks of the 4th Infantry Regiment, built in 1874 and extended in 1876, is the oldest surviving Western-style building in the prefecture and a Prefectural Tangible Cultural Property.

== See also ==
- Sendai City Museum
