= Koyanagawa clan =

Samurai clan

Koyanagawa 小梁川
- Parent house: Date clan
- Founder: Koyanagawa Morimune
- Founding year: 15th century
- Ruled until: 1867
- Cadet branches: Shiomori clan; Furuta clan

The Koyanagawa clan (小梁川氏, Koyanagawa-shi) was a samurai family in Japan descending from the Date clan, a daimyo (feudal lord) family in Mutsu Province.

== History ==
The third son of Date Mochimune, the 11th head of the Date clan, Date Morimune (1440 - November 19, 1500), took the name Koyanagawa from Koyanagawa, Date-gun, Mutsu Province.

According to Date Seishin Kafu, Morimune gathered the Date clan vassals and led all the officials during the time when the 13th clan head, Morimune's nephew, Date Naomune, was aged from 3 to 15 (1455-1467). However, this is considered impossible because not only the elder brother and 12th clan head, Date Narimune, but also Date Mochimune (died in 1469) were still alive at this time.

In 1591, Date Masamune moved to Iwadeyama due to the Kasai Ōsaki Rebel, when the old territories of Nagai and Date were seized. At this time, Morimune also moved to Esashi-gun. During the Edo period, the Koyagawa clan further moved to Notezaki within the same province, and after that, the clan ruled the area until the Meiji Restoration.

== Genealogy ==
The Koyanagawa clan descends from Fujiwara no Yamakage's line of the Fujiwara clan's Hokke house through the Date clan. The patriarch of the Koyanagawa clan, Koyanagawa Morimune, was the third son of Date Mochimune, the 11th head of the Date clan.

== Clan heads ==
1. Koyanagawa Morimune
2. Koyanagawa Chikatomo
3. Koyanagawa Chikamune
4. Koyanagawa Morimune
5. Koyanagawa Muneshige
6. Koyanagawa Munekage
7. Koyanagawa Muneyoshi
8. Koyanagawa Munehide
9. Date Muraoki
10. Koyanagawa Munenaga
11. Koyanagawa Muneshige
12. Koyanagawa Moriaki
13. Koyanagawa Morisane
14. Koyanagawa Moriaki
15. Koyanagawa Yasumori
16. Koyanagawa Moriyuki (later Date Kunimori)

== See also ==
- Date clan
