= Date Yoshimura =

Japanese samurai (1680–1752)

- 伊達吉村
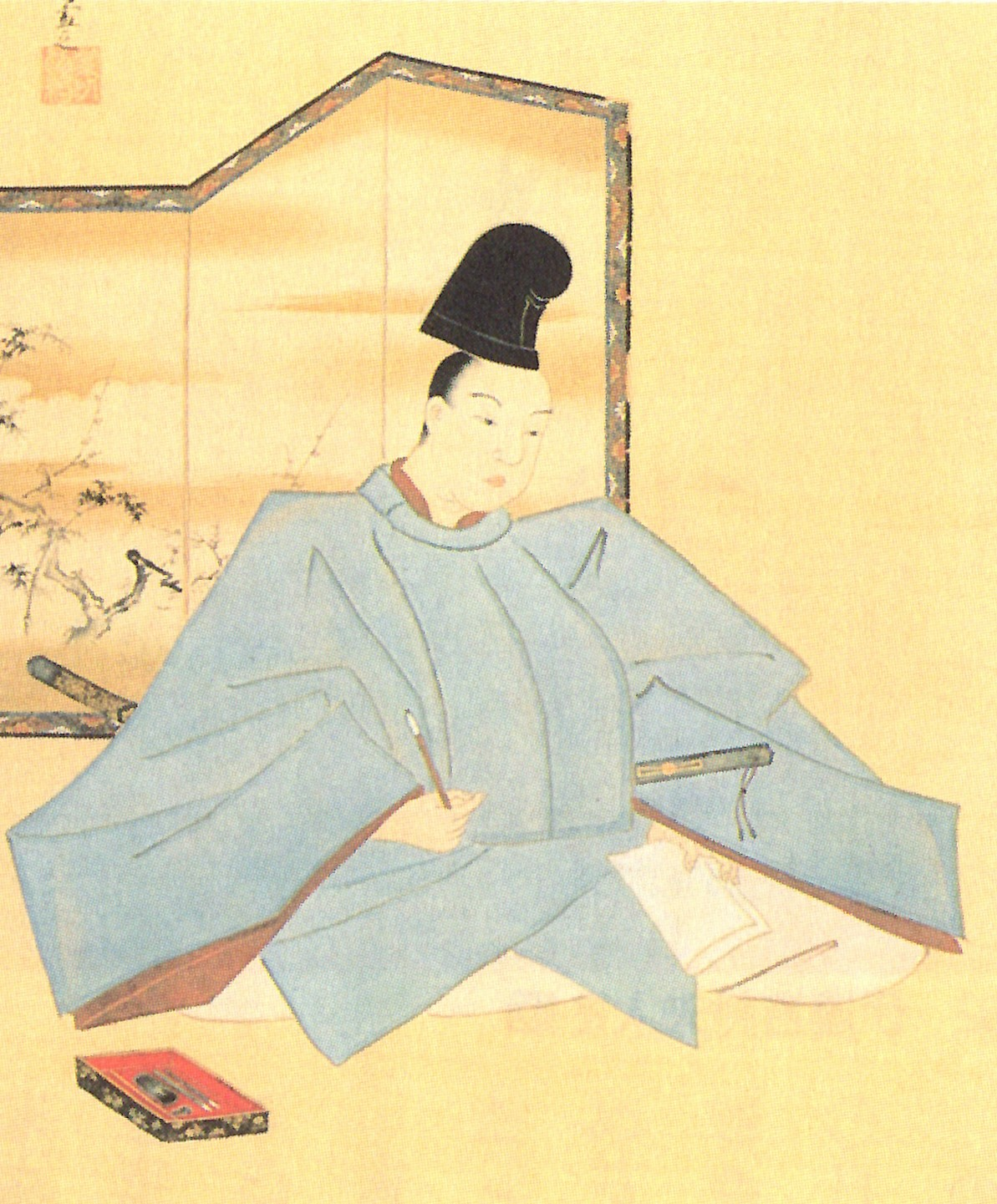
- Portrait of Date Yoshimura at Sendai City Museum

5th Daimyō of Sendai Domain
- In office 1703–1743
- Monarchs: Shōgun: Tokugawa Tsunayoshi; Tokugawa Ienobu; Tokugawa Ietsugu; Tokugawa Yoshimune
- Preceded by: Date Tsunamura
- Succeeded by: Date Munemura

Personal details
- Born: July 23, 1680 Daitō, Iwate, Japan
- Died: February 8, 1752 (aged 71) Sodegasaki, Miyagi, Japan
- Spouse(s): Fuyu-hime, daughter of Kuga Michina
- Parents: Date Munefusa (father); daughter of Katakura Kagenaga (mother)

Date Yoshimura (伊達吉村; DAH-tay; 23 July 1680 – 8 February 1752) was a mid-Edo period Japanese samurai, and the fifth daimyō of Sendai Domain in northern Japan, and the 21st hereditary chieftain of the Date clan. The longest-serving of any of the daimyō of Sendai Domain, Yoshimura placed the domain back on sound financial footing.

== Biography ==
Yoshimura was the eldest son of Date Munefusa (the 8th son of Date Tadamune, who had established a cadet branch of the clan. He was born in what is now part of the village of Daitō, Iwate in the northern part of the domain, and his childhood name was Sukesaburo (助三郎). His mother was the daughter of Katakura Kagenaga. He became head of his household on 13 January 1686 on the death of his father, and underwent the genpuku ceremony in December 1690, receiving the name of Date Murafusa (伊達村房). In 1693, when the clansmen and senior retainers petitioned Date Tsunamura to retire, his name does not appear on the documents.

In March 1695, he was to be adopted as heir by Tamura Tatsuaki of Ichinoseki Domain; however, before official notice could be given to the shogunate, he was adopted by Date Tsunamura as his heir instead. His courtesy title was Echizen-no-kami, and his Court rank was Senior Fifth Rank, Lower Grade. He was received in formal audience by Shōgun Tokugawa Tsunayoshi in November 1696 and was given the name of Yoshimura, along with the Court Rank of Senior Fourth Rank, Lower Grade and honorary title of chamberlain. He became daimyō upon Tsunamura's retirement in 1703, and also inherited the courtesy title of Sakonoe-gon-shōshō (General of the Left Guards) and Mutsu-no-kami.

Yoshimura first entered Aoba Castle on 21 May 1704. At the time, the domain was in a state of bankruptcy, caused by Tsunamura's ambitious public works and temple building projects. Determining that one cause of the debt and inflation was the domain's issuance of paper currency, he stopped issuance and began a process of removing these bills from circulation. In September 1706 he took the unprecedented step of informing the shogunate that Date Domain did not have the necessary funds to make its mandatory sankin-kōtai to Edo, and asked for financial assistance. The shogunate agreed to temporarily cut the domain's taxes in half and to accept payment in currency rather than rice. At the time, the domain's debt exceeded 123,000 ryō and continued to snowball due to high interest rates. In 1711, when Date Yoshimura ordered to accompany the Shogunal pilgrimage to Nikkō Tōshō-gū, the domain was forced to borrow an additional 73,700 ryō from moneylenders in Edo and Kyoto. In 1711, his court rank was increased to Senior Fourth Rank, Upper Grade and his courtesy title to Sakonoe-gon-chūshō.

In an effort to overcome the fiscal crisis, the domain conducted a re-survey in 1725, followed by extensive land reform to uncover undeclared rice lands and to bring waste lands back under cultivation. However, these efforts were hampered by poor harvests due to inclement weather, and by the opposition of many landholders.

In 1726, the position of Fushin bugyō was abolished, and in 1729 the number of gundai (district governors) was reduced from eight to four, all in an effort to streamline the domain administration and reduce expenses. On the positive side, the shogunate established a mint for copper coinage in Sendai, using locally mined copper, in 1727. The use of currency for transactions corresponding increased within the domain, and the domain also took steps to buy up all surplus rice from farmers and sell in Edo for a profit. It was claimed that most of the rice on sale in Edo in the early 18th century was from Sendai. In 1732, a very severe famine struck the Kansai region of Japan, but Sendai enjoyed a bumper crop that year and was able to ship a very large quantity of rice to the affected areas, making over 500,000 ryō in profits and to wipe out decades of debt at a single stroke.

In 1743, Yoshimura retired in favor of his son, Date Munemura, and moved to his villa in Sodegasaki, where he died in 1752. He was posthumously elevated to Senior Third Rank in 1928.

== Family ==
- Father: Date Munefusa (1646–1686)
- Mother: Matsuhime
- Wife: Chosho-in (Fuyuhime) (1689–1745)
  - 1st daughter: Yukihime, died in childhood
  - 2nd daughter: Kazuhime, married Ikeda Tsugumasa, daimyo of Okayama Domain
  - 3rd daughter: Tomihime married Date Muratoshi, daimyo of Uwajima Domain
  - 4th daughter: Tachihime, died in childhood
  - 5th daughter: Toshihime, died in childhood
  - 4th son: Date Munemura, daimyo of Sendai Domain
- Concubine: Okatashi no Kata
  - 1st son: Date Muramasa (1722–1729)
  - 6th daughter: Mihohime married Inaba Masayoshi, daimyo of Yodo Domain
- Concubine: Osomi no Kata
  - 2nd son: Date Kikujiro, died in childhood
  - 3rd son: Date Murakaze, made 1000 koku hatamoto, died without heir
- Concubine: Otachi no Kata
  - 7th daughter: Yurihime, died in childhood
  - 8th daughter: Gohime (d.1752), married Katakura Murakiyo by Otachi no Kata
  - 5th son: Tamura Murataka (1737–1782), daimyo of Ichinoseki Domain
  - 6th son: Date Yukisuke, died in childhood
  - 7th son: Date Tominosuke, died in childhood
  - 8th son: Date Murayoshi (1743-1787), adopted as head of the hatamoto Tome-Date clan
