= Date Narimune =

Japanese daimyo (1796–1819)

- 伊達斉宗
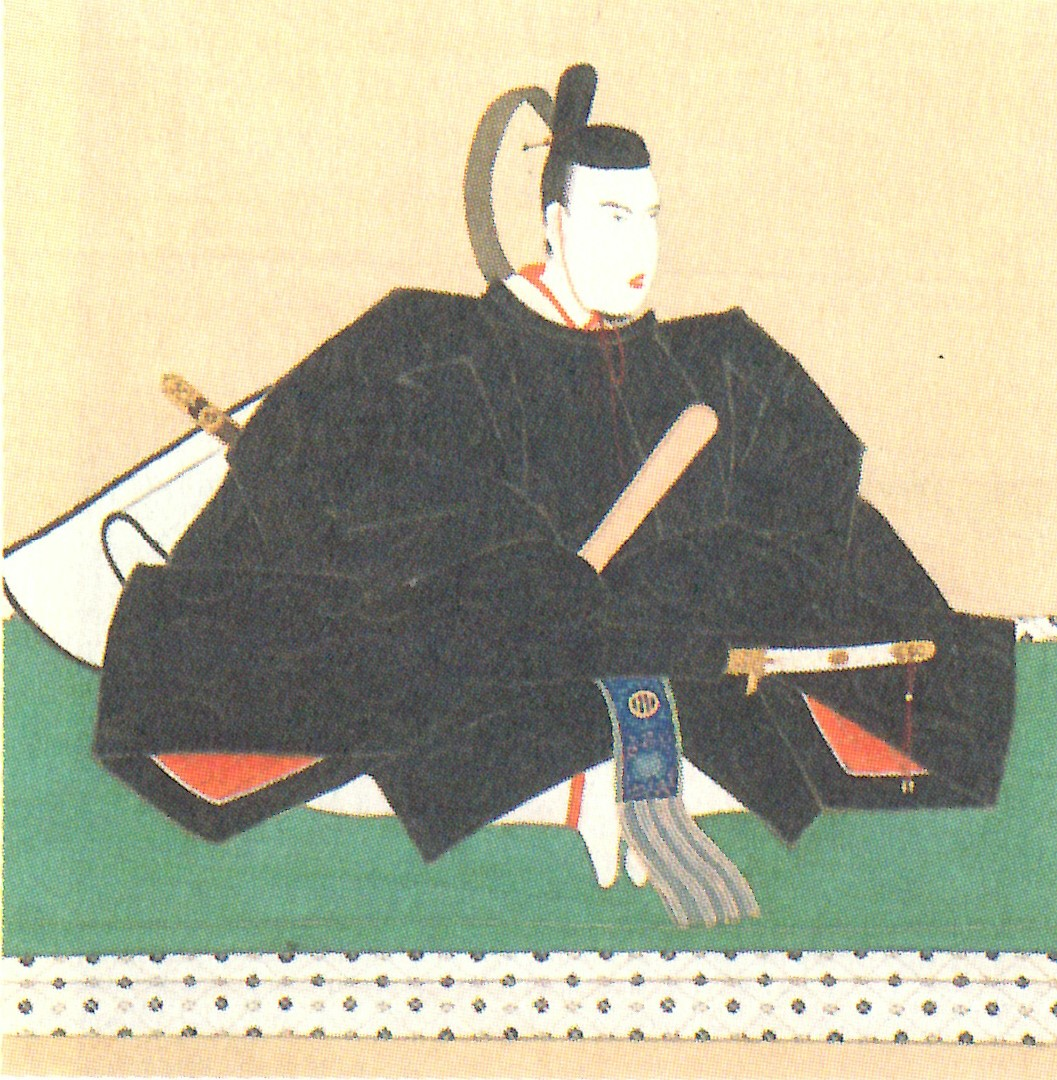
- Portrait of Date Narimune at Sendai City Museum

10th Daimyō of Sendai Domain
- In office 1812–1819
- Monarch: Shōgun: Tokugawa Ienari
- Preceded by: Date Chikamune
- Succeeded by: Date Nariyoshi

Personal details
- Born: October 15, 1796 Edo, Japan
- Died: October 15, 1819 (aged 23)
- Spouse(s): Nobuko, daughter of Tokugawa Harutomi
- Parent: Date Narimura (father)

Date Narimune (伊達斉宗; DAH-tay; 15 October 1796 – 15 July 1819) was a mid-Edo period Japanese samurai, and the tenth daimyō of Sendai Domain in the Tōhoku region of northern Japan, and the 26th hereditary chieftain of the Date clan.

== Biography ==
Narimune was the posthumous second son of Date Narimura; his mother was a concubine and he was born at the clan's Sodegasaki residence in Edo. His childhood name was Norisaburō (徳三郎) later Shōjirō (総次郎). In 1804, he was moved to the clan's primary residence in Edo, and he came down with chickenpox the same year, but recovered. In 1809, his elder half-brother, Date Chikamune was highly disfigured by smallpox, and went into seclusion until his death in 1812. During this period, Narimune appeared in all official functions in his place. He was adopted as Chikamune's heir in 1812, and changed his name to Date Munezumi. Later that same year, after Chikamune died, he was received in formal audience by Shōgun Tokugawa Ienari, who presided over his genpuku ceremony, and who granted him a kanji from his name. He also received the Court rank of Junior Fourth, Lower Grade and courtesy titles of Mutsu-no-kami and Sakonoe-shōshō as had been held by his father. In 1814, he was wed to the daughter of Tokugawa Harutomi, daimyō of Kii Domain.

He fell ill in June 1819 and died a month later at the age of 22. As he had no male heir, the son of Tamura Murasuke, daimyō of Ichinoseki Domain was posthumously adopted as his heir.

== Family ==
- Father: Date Narimura
- Mother: Onobu no Kata (1779–1800)
- Wife: Tokugawa Nobuko (Shinkyou’in) (1795–1827)
- Concubine:Tsuda-dono
- Concubine: Watanabe-dono
- Children (mother unknown):
  - 1st son: Makomaru, died in childhood
  - 1st daughter: Shibahime, married Date Nariyoshi, daimyo of Sendai Domain
