= Ishikawa Munetaka =

Head of the Kakuda-Ishikawa clan

Ishikawa Munetaka 石川宗敬
- Born: June 26, 1607; Igu, Mutsu
- Died: November 20, 1668 (aged 61)
- Other names: Yūzōmaru (熊増丸); Muneaki (宗昭); Suruga (駿河)
- Spouse: Muuhime
- Children: Ishikawa Munehiro; Ishikawa Munenobu; Ishikawa Sadahiro; Chiyotsuruhime; Kahokuhime
- Parent(s): Ishikawa Yoshimune; Shizuko
- Family: Ishikawa clan

Ishikawa Munetaka (石川宗敬; June 26, 1607 – November 20, 1668) was the third head of the Kakuda-Ishikawa clan.

== Life ==
Munekata was born on June 26, 1607, in Igu, Mutsu Province, as the son of Ishikawa Yoshimune. His childhood name was Kumamasumaru. In 1610, his father, Yoshimune, died of an illness, but because Yūzōmaru was still young, his grandfather, Akimitsu, became his guardian. In 1616, he received a letter from Date Masamune for his genpuku, and he was renamed Muneaki. In 1619, he married Masamune's daughter, Muuhime. In 1621, he officially succeeded as the third head of the Kakuda-Ishikawa clan. He received 2,000 koku, totaling in 12,000 koku. On November 20, 1668, at the age of 62, Munekata died from an illness.
