= Date Mochimune =

Samurai of the Muromachi period

Date Mochimune (伊達 持宗, 1393 - February 19, 1469) was a Japanese samurai lord and jitō (territory steward) of the Muromachi period. He served as the Second Assistant to the Minister of War and the Head of Bureau of Imperial Cuisine. He was the 11th head of the Date clan.

== Life ==
Date Mochimune was born in 1393 as the eldest son of Date Ujimune, the 10th head of the Date clan. His childhood name was Matsuinumaru. The kanji "mochi" (持) in his adult name was rewarded by Ashikaga Yoshimochi, the 4th shogun of the Ashikaga shogunate.

In 1413, Mochimune along with Sugata Sadakatsu attempted to advance into the neighboring Nobuo Manor. However, the Nikaidō clan based in the Nobuo Manor requested reinforcements from the shogun, Ashikaga Mochiuji, resulting in a war. The war ended in the fall of the Daibutsu Castle (Fukushima Castle). After this, Mochimune settled at the Yanagawa Castle and built the Yanagawa Hachimangu Shrine in 1441.

Mochimune's third son, Date Morimune later changes his family name from Date to Koyanagawa and establishes the Koyanagawa clan.

Mochimune died on February 19, 1469, aged 75 or 76.
