= Date Yoshikuni =

Japanese samurai (1825–1874)

- 伊達 慶邦
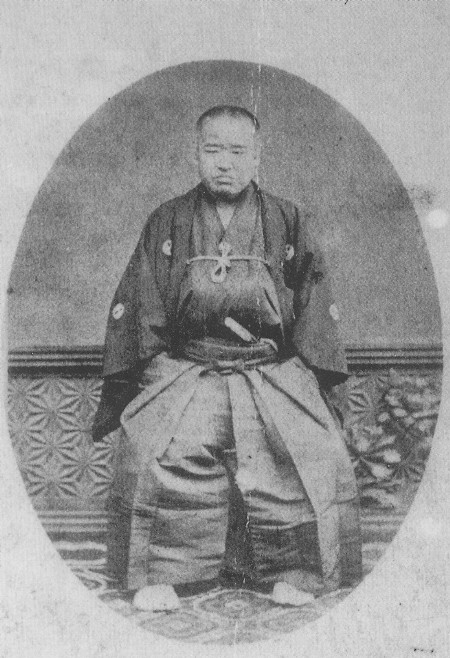
- Portrait of Date Yoshikuni

13th Daimyō of Sendai Domain
- In office 1841–1868
- Monarchs: Shōgun: Tokugawa Ieyoshi; Tokugawa Iesada; Tokugawa Iemochi; Tokugawa Yoshinobu
- Preceded by: Date Narikuni
- Succeeded by: Date Munemoto

Personal details
- Born: October 17, 1825 Sendai, Japan
- Died: July 12, 1874 (aged 48) Tokyo, Japan
- Spouse(s): Takatsukasa Tsunahime (1st wife), Tokugawa Takako (2nd wife)
- Parent: Date Nariyoshi (father)

Date Yoshikuni (伊達 慶邦; DAH-tay; October 17, 1825 – July 12, 1874) was a late-Edo period Japanese samurai, and the 13th daimyō of Sendai Domain in the Tōhoku region of northern Japan, the 29th hereditary chieftain of the Date clan. He is known primarily for his role as commander-in-chief of the Ōuetsu Reppan Dōmei during the Boshin War of the Meiji Restoration.

During his tenure he was also known by his courtesy title, Mutsu no Kami (陸奥守). His poetic name was Rakuzan-kō (楽山公)

== Biography ==
=== Early life ===
Yoshikuni was born at Aoba Castle in Sendai, the second son of the 11th-generation daimyō Date Nariyoshi. His childhood name was first Jozaburō (穣三郎), and then Tōjirō (藤次郎). In 1837, he was adopted as Date Narikuni’s official successor, taking the name of Date Toshimura.

Early the following year, at age 14, he had his coming-of-age ceremony in Edo Castle, and was received in formal audience by the shōgun Tokugawa Ieyoshi, who bestowed upon him the "yoshi" kanji from his name, thus becoming Date Yoshitoshi, and receiving the courtesy titles of Chikuzen-no-kami and jijū (chamberlain).

Late in 1841, on the death of his foster-father (brother-in-law) he became daimyō of Sendai Domain, received the courtesy titles of Mutsu no Kami and Sakon-e gon-shosho. He also changed his name to Date Yoshikuni at this time, taking the "kuni" character from his predecessor's name.

=== Career as daimyō ===
Despite its high kokudaka of 620,000 koku, the domain inherited by Date Yoshikuni was beset with problems. The countryside was ravaged from the effects of enormous Tenpo famine, and for much of his tenure his actual income was much reduced, at times to even the 100,000 koku level. The domain was also given the responsibility of policing the vast northern island of Ezo, including border patrols in Chishima islands, especially Etorofu and Kunashiri where incursions by ships from the Russian Empire were becoming more frequent. Sendai domain administered roughly one-third of the area of present-day Hokkaido.

The finances of the domain were further weakened when assigned by the shogunate the task of contributing to security efforts in Kyoto in the 1860s. Sendai Domain was assigned to guard the Shimodachiuri-gomon Gate of the Imperial Palace. With the start of the Boshin War in 1868, Sendai initially remained neutral, and its forces based in Kyoto were not involved in the Battle of Toba–Fushimi. In the period immediately following the battle, Date Yoshikuni was consulted by Matsudaira Nobunori, lord of Aizu Domain, who wished to use the Date clan's as-yet unmarred reputation in the eyes of the Satchō Alliance in order to achieve leniency for his father, Matsudaira Katamori. However, traditional rivalries between the domains of eastern and western Japan, and the arrogant behavior of emissaries sent by the Satchō Alliance, such as Sara Shuzo forced Yoshikuni's hand, and he eventually became the somewhat reluctant leader of the Ōuetsu Reppan Dōmei. He was appointed shōgun by Prince Kitashirakawa Yoshihisa, who had declared himself the northern emperor, Tōbu. However, because of Yoshikuni's indecisiveness and the confederation's incohesiveness and obsolescence of its weapons and tactics, Sendai Domain was defeated by the combined armies of the new Meiji government, led by Kujō Michitaka. Yoshikuni retired to the domain’s residence in Tokyo together with his son Date Muneatsu, and voluntarily placed themselves in confinement.

The same year, Yoshikuni's fourth son Date Munemoto succeeded as clan leader and was allowed to become daimyō of a much reduced Sendai Domain, with revenues of only 280,000 koku. Yoshikuni remained in retirement until his death in 1874 at age 50. His funeral was held at the Buddhist temple of Saifuku-ji in Komagome, Tokyo, but according to Shinto rituals, so he did not receive a posthumous name. In April 1890, his ashes were removed to the Date clan's cemetery at Dainen-ji in Sendai.

== Family ==
- Father: Date Nariyoshi
- Mother: Tsuneko no Kata
- Wife: Tsunahime (1828-1852), 24th daughter of Takatsukasa Masahiro, adopted by Konoe Tadahiro
- Wife: Yachiyohime Takako (1841–1869), 9th daughter of Tokugawa Nariaki
- Concubine: Kawakami Chisa
  - 1st daughter: Ayahime, died in childhood
  - 2nd daughter: Eihime, died in childhood
  - 1st son: Date Teimaru, died in childhood
- Concubine: Matsuoka Michiko
  - 2nd son: Date Munemoto, Daimyo of Sendai Domain, Count
  - 3rd son: Date Matsugoro, died in childhood
  - 4th son: Date Kunimune (1870–1923), Count, heir to Date Munemoto
  - 5th son: Date Yukichiyo, died in childhood
  - 6th son: Date Tokugoro, died in childhood
- Concubine: Tendo Tsunako
- Concubine: Iwama Kaneko

== See also ==
- Date clan
