= Date Chikamune =

Daimyo

- 伊達周宗
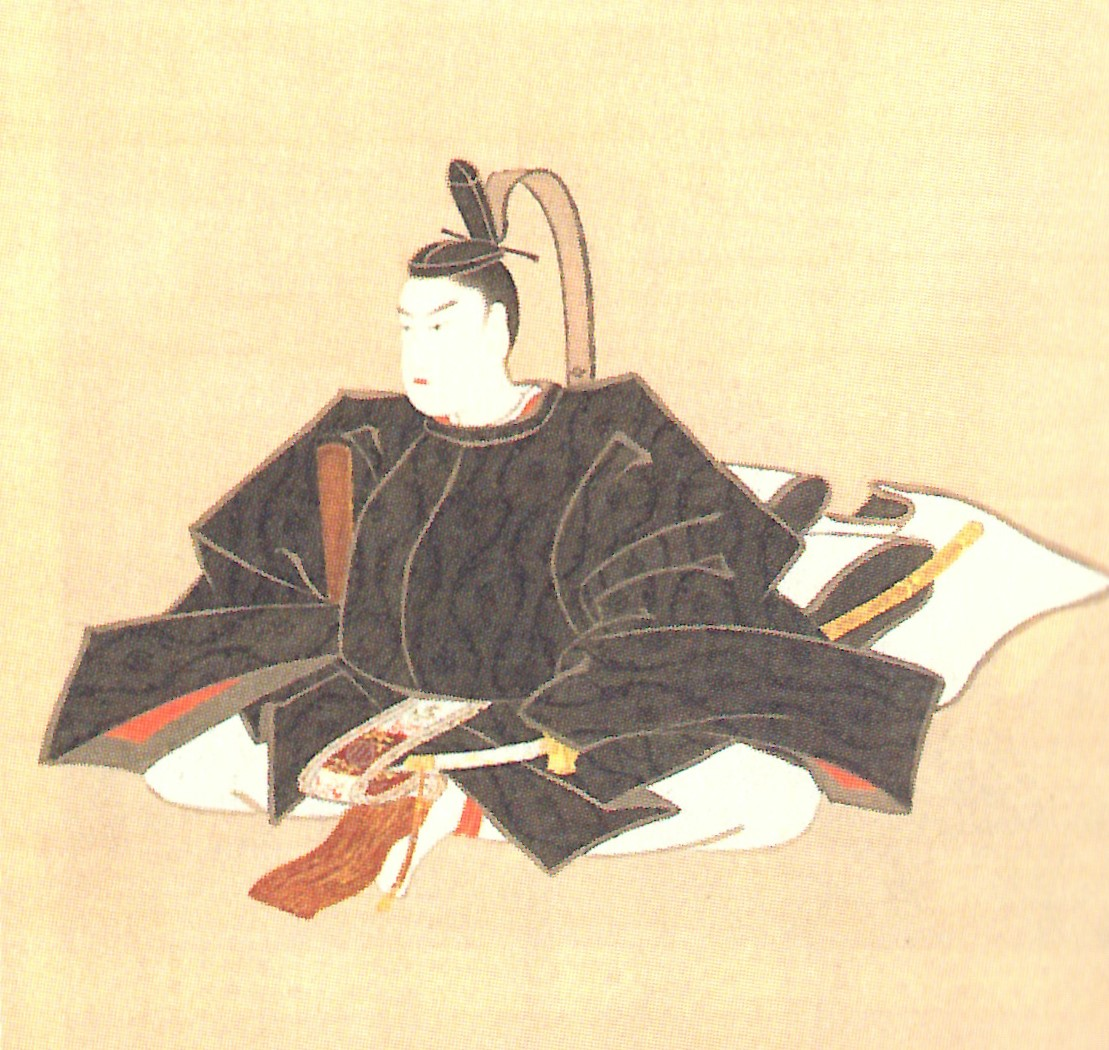
- Portrait of Date Chikamune at Sendai City Museum

9th Daimyō of Sendai Domain
- In office 1796–1812
- Monarch: Shōgun: Tokugawa Ienari
- Preceded by: Date Narimura
- Succeeded by: Date Narimune

Personal details
- Born: April 9, 1796 Edo, Japan
- Died: June 3, 1812 (aged 16) Sendai, Japan
- Resting place: Zuihōden, Sendai, Japan
- Spouse: daughter of Tokugawa Ienari
- Parent: Date Narimura (father)

Date Chikamune (伊達周宗; DAH-tay; 9 April 1796 – 3 June 1812) was a mid-Edo period Japanese samurai, and the ninth daimyō of Sendai Domain in northern Japan, and the 25th hereditary chieftain of the Date clan.

== Biography ==
Chikamune was the eldest son of Date Narimura. His childhood name was Masachiyo (政千代). His mother, Nobuko, was the daughter of the kampaku Takatsukasa Sukehira, thus making Chikamune the second cousin of Emperor Kōkaku. His mother died shortly after his birth due to complications with the pregnancy, and both his grandfather and father followed during the same year, leaving the infant Chikamune as daimyō of Sendai. Normally, this would be cause for the Tokugawa shogunate to appoint a metsuke to oversee the domain until his majority, or could even be a cause of attainder, so the domain's officials kept the fact of Date Narimura's death a secret for several months until the succession was confirmed. In the same year, the infant Chikamune was wed to Aya-hime, a daughter of Shōgun Tokugawa Ienari. During this period, his grandmother, Kanshin-in, wielded great influence.

In 1797, Sendai was beset by the largest peasant revolt in its history. The causes were various, and included opposition to reforms initiated during the rule of Date Narimura, and the rebels included 61 upper-rank samurai and more than 2000 lower-rank samurai. Aya-hime also died during the same year.

In 1805, Kanshin-in died, and her influence was replaced by that of Chikamune's great-grandmother. In 1806, Chikamune was wed to Aya-hime's younger sister, Asa-hime, thus re-securing the connection between the Date clan and the Tokugawa, and in 1807, the retired rōjū Matsudaira Sadanobu spent four months in Sendai to oversee affairs. In 1808, the shogunate assigned Sendai Domain to secure the northern frontier of Japan at Hakodate, Iturup and Kunashir against increasing incursions by Russia. The domain dispatched 1700 troops to these areas.

In 1809, Chikamune contracted smallpox, Although he survived the disease, he was left disfigured to the extent that his appearance at any official function was deemed inappropriate. His younger half-brother, Tokusaburō (Date Narimune) was adopted as his heir in 1812. Chikamune died two months later at the age of 17. His grave is at the Zuihoden in Sendai.

His wife later remarried to Matsudaira Naritsugu, daimyō of Fukui Domain.

== Family ==
- Father: Date Narimura
- Mother: Takatsukasa Nobuko (1775–1796)
- Wives:
  - Aya-hime (1795–1797), daughter of Tokugawa Ienari
  - Asa-hime (1803–1843), daughter of Tokugawa Ienari

== Controversy over death ==
Chikamune was not seen in public after he contracted smallpox on 4 January 1806 and died of unknown causes two months after the appointment of Date Narimune as his successor. This has led many historians to postulate that Chikamune may have actually died in 1806, and that his death was kept a secret from the authorities. Sendai Domain had been in danger of attainder ever since the death of Date Narimura, and this had been avoided largely through a marriage tie with Shōgun Tokugawa Ienari. The death of Chikamune without heir would have voided this arrangement.
