= Yasuko Date =

Japanese businesswoman

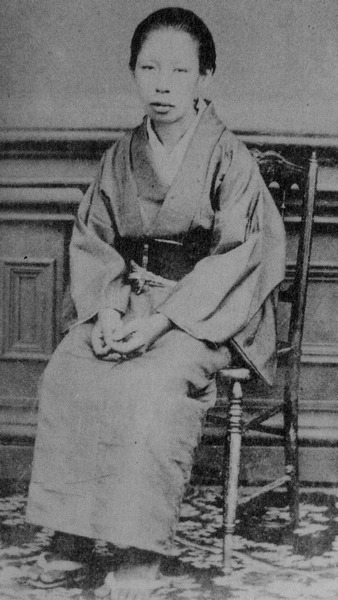
Yasuko Date

Yasuko Date (1827–1904), was a Japanese businesswoman.

She was a member of the Feudal Watari Date family of Hokkaido. She benefitted the development of the region in a significant way. She was active in the silk industry and a businesswoman within the silk business of the region.
