= Ōuetsu Reppan Dōmei =

Japanese military-political coalition during the Bōshin War (1868-69)

- 奥羽越列藩同盟
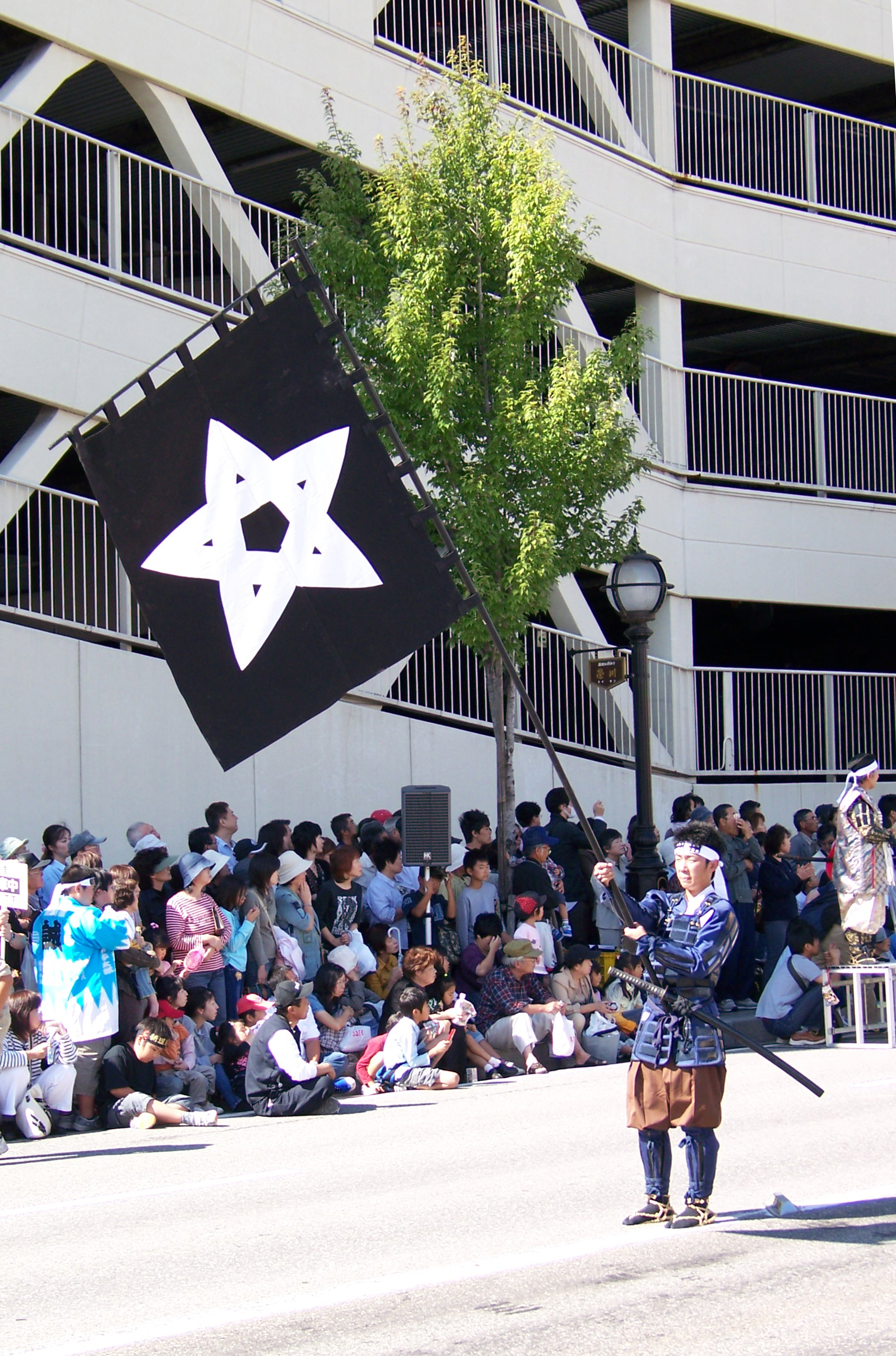
- Standard-bearer at the 2006 Aizu Parade bearing the flag of the Ōuetsu Reppan Dōmei
- Formation: Spring 1868; 158 years ago
- Type: Military and political alliance
- Headquarters: Shiroishi, Sendai Domain, Japan
- Members: 31 domains of Northern Japan
- Official language: Japanese
- Meishu (Alliance Head): Prince Kitashirakawa Yoshihisa
- Sotoku (Governor-General): Date Yoshikuni, Uesugi Narinori

The Ōuetsu Reppan Dōmei (奥羽越列藩同盟; lit. 'Alliance of the domains of Mutsu, Dewa, and Echigo') was a Japanese military-political coalition established and disestablished over the course of several months in early to mid-1868 during the Boshin War. Its flag was either a white interwoven five-pointed star on a black field, or a black interwoven five-pointed star on a white field. It is also known as the Northern Alliance (北部同盟, Hokubu Dōmei).

== History ==
The Alliance centered on the Sendai, Yonezawa, and Nihonmatsu domains, and drew together nearly all domains from the provinces of Mutsu and Dewa, several domains of northern Echigo Province, and even the Matsumae Domain of Ezo (modern-day Hokkaidō). Headquartered at Shiroishi Castle, the alliance's nominal head was Prince Kitashirakawa Yoshihisa, the onetime abbot of Kan'eiji Temple in Edo who fled north following the Satsuma–Chōshū takeover of the city, who declared himself "Emperor Tobu" (東武天皇), with Date Yoshikuni of Sendai and Uesugi Narinori of Yonezawa as the head of the Alliance. Although heteroclite in nature, the Alliance formed of a combination of modern and traditional forces, and mobilized a total of about 50,000 soldiers. Though the alliance did its best to support the Aizu Domain (会津藩), Aizu was not formally part of the alliance "Kaishō Alliance" (会庄同盟); neither was Shōnai (庄内藩).

In addition, though it technically no longer existed as a domain, the forces of the Hayashi clan of Jōzai Domain also fought on behalf of the Alliance against the Imperial troops.

While the alliance was a bold, innovative step that combined the military forces of several dozen domains, it was unable to fully act as a single, cohesive unit, and with the fall of Sendai and Aizu, it effectively collapsed.

== Members of the Ōuetsu Reppan Dōmei ==
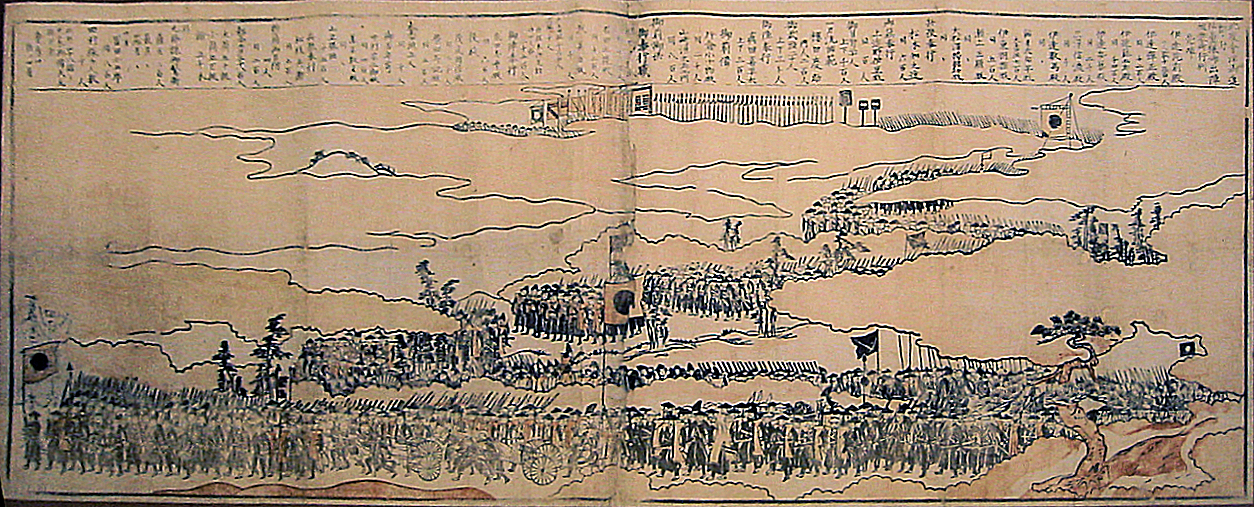
Troops from Sendai, following their mobilization in April, joined the Northern Alliance against Imperial troops in May 1868.

Flag

Domain	Ruling Family	Province
Matsumae	Matsumae	Ezo
Morioka	Nanbu	Mutsu
Nihonmatsu	Niwa	Mutsu
Hirosaki	Tsugaru	Mutsu
Tanagura	Abe	Mutsu
Sōma	Sōma	Mutsu
Sendai	Date	Mutsu
Ichinoseki	Tamura	Mutsu
Miharu	Akita	Mutsu
Iwakitaira	Andō	Mutsu
Fukushima	Itakura	Mutsu
Moriyama	Matsudaira	Mutsu
Izumi	Honda	Mutsu
Hachinohe	Nanbu	Mutsu
Yunagaya	Naitō	Mutsu
Miike	Tachibana	Fukuoka
Akita	Satake	Dewa
Yonezawa	Uesugi	Dewa
Shinjō	Tozawa	Dewa
Yamagata	Mizuno	Dewa
Kaminoyama	Matsudaira	Dewa
Honjō	Rokugō	Dewa
Kameda	Iwaki	Dewa
Tendō	Oda	Dewa
Yashima	Ikoma	Dewa
Shibata	Mizoguchi	Echigo
Nagaoka	Makino	Echigo
Murakami	Naitō	Echigo
Muramatsu	Hori	Echigo
Mineyama	Kyōgoku	Tango
Kurokawa	Yanagisawa	Echigo
