= Sendai Domain =

Domain of the Tokugawa shogunate

Sendai Domain 仙台藩 Sendai-han
- Domain of Japan
- 1600–1871
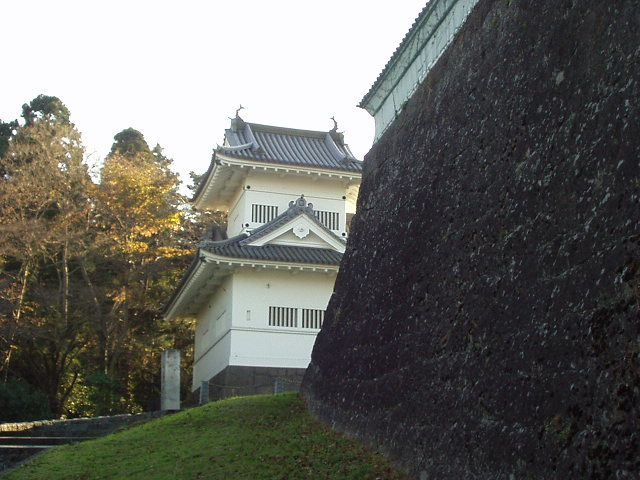
- Reconstructed Aoba Castle in Sendai

- Flag Mon of the Date
- Capital: Aoba Castle
- Area
  - Coordinates: 38°15′09″N 140°51′22″E
- Government
- Daimyō
  - 1600-1636: Date Masamune (first)
  - 1868: Date Munemoto (last)
- Historical era: Edo period
  - Established: 1600
  - Abolition of the han system: 1871
- Contained within
  - Province: Mutsu
- Today part of: Fukushima Prefecture; Iwate Prefecture; Miyagi Prefecture

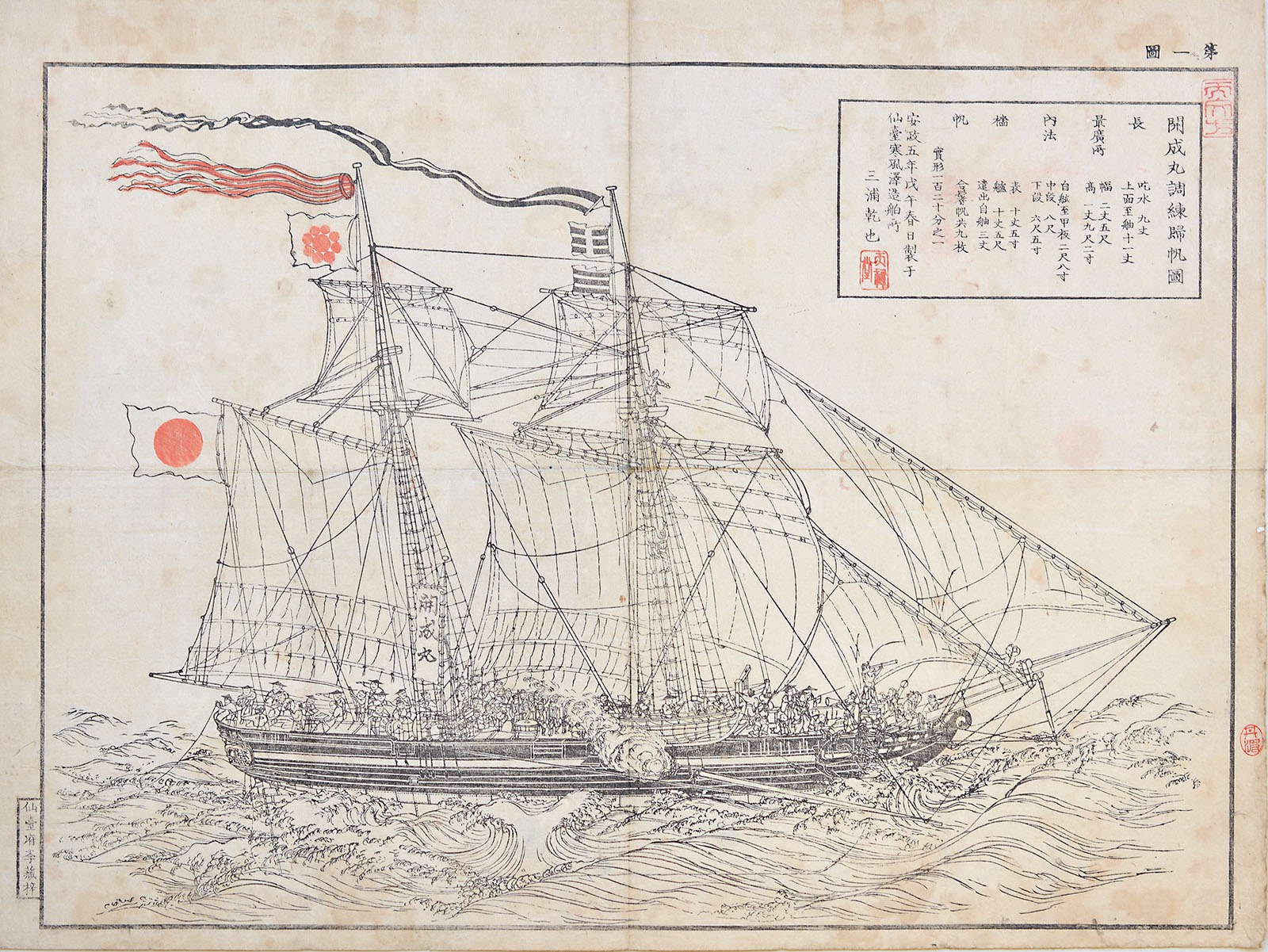
Kaisei Maru was one of the first Japanese western-style sailing ships, 1858

The Sendai Domain (仙台藩, Sendai-han), also known as the Date Domain (伊達藩, Date-han), was a domain of the Tokugawa Shogunate of Japan during the Edo period from 1600 to 1871.

The Sendai Domain was based at Aoba Castle in Mutsu Province, in the modern city of Sendai, located in the Tōhoku region of the island of Honshu. The Sendai Domain was ruled for its existence by the tozama daimyō of the Date, and under the kokudaka system its income rating at 625,000 koku was the third-largest domain in Japan after the Satsuma Domain and Kaga Domain. The Sendai Domain was geographically the largest domain in northern Japan with its mostly-contiguous holdings covering most of southern Mutsu Province, including all of present-day Miyagi Prefecture, parts of southern Iwate Prefecture and northeastern Fukushima Prefecture. The Sendai Domain was the focal member of the Ōuetsu Reppan Dōmei against the Meiji Restoration during the Boshin War. The Sendai Domain was dissolved in the abolition of the han system in 1871 by the Meiji government.

== Foundation ==
The Sendai domain was founded in the closing years of the 16th century. When Date Masamune presented himself to Toyotomi Hideyoshi, who was undertaking the Odawara Campaign, he was granted the former fiefs of the Kasai 葛西 and Ōsaki 大崎 families, in return for his hereditary lands of Yonezawa 米沢, Aizu 会津, and Sendō 仙道. Upon entry into his new fief, Masamune took up residence in Iwadeyama Castle, and then started construction on Sendai Castle. The name of Sendai at this time was written 千代, however, Masamune changed it to 仙臺 (Later changed to the current 仙台)("hermit's platform," presumably alluding to Chinese mysticism). During the Sekigahara Campaign, the Date clan had been promised an increase in formal domain income to one million koku; however, as they were fighting with the Uesugi clan for their old lands in the Date district, this did not come to pass. It has been estimated that the Sendai Domain's jitsudaka, or true income level, may have been somewhere between one and two million koku.

A relief sculpture on the base of Masamune's equestrian statue in Sendai Castle commemorates his entry into the city, which was then a small village.

== Daimyōs of Sendai ==
A list of the daimyōs of Sendai follows below, in chronological order:

1. Date Masamune (1567–1636), r. 1600–1636
2. Date Tadamune (1600–1658), r. 1636–1658
3. Date Tsunamune (1640–1711), r. 1658–1660
4. Date Tsunamura (1659–1719), r. 1660–1703
5. Date Yoshimura (1680–1752), r. 1703–1743
6. Date Munemura (1718–1756), r. 1743–1756
7. Date Shigemura (1742–1796), r. 1756–1790
8. Date Narimura (1775–1796), r. 1790–1796
9. Date Chikamune (1796–1809), r. 1796–1809(1812)
10. Date Narimune (1796–1819), r. 1809(1812)–1819
11. Date Nariyoshi (1798–1828), r. 1819–1827
12. Date Narikuni (1817–1841), r. 1827–1841
13. Date Yoshikuni (1825–1874), r. 1841–1868
14. Date Munemoto (1866–1917), r. 1868

Munemoto ruled briefly as the 14th and final lord of Sendai in 1868, when the domain was abolished. He thus became the first imperial governor of Sendai, serving until 1870, and was succeeded by a cousin, Date Muneatsu, who served as the second imperial governor until 1871.

=== Genealogy (simplified) ===
- I. Date Masamune, 1st daimyō of Sendai (cr. 1600) (1567–1636; r. 1600–1636)
  - Hisamune, 1st daimyō of Uwajima (1591–1658; daimyō of Uwajima: 1614–1657)
    - Munetoshi, 2nd daimyō of Uwajima (1635–1709; r. 1657–1693)
  - II. Tadamune, 2nd daimyō of Sendai (1600–1658; r. 1636–1658)
    - III. Tsunamune, 3rd daimyō of Sendai (1640–1711; r. 1658–1660)
      - IV. Tsunamura, 4th daimyō of Sendai (1659–1719; r. 1660–1703)
      - Muneyoshi, 3rd daimyō of Uwajima (1665–1711; r. 1693–1711)
        - Muratoshi, 4th daimyō of Uwajima (1705–1735; r. 1711–1735)
          - Muratoki, 5th daimyō of Uwajima (1725–1794; r. 1735–1794)
            - Yamaguchi Naokiyo (1754–1793). Married Yamaguchi Tomoko, daughter of a hatamoto and adopted into her family
              - Yamaguchi Naokatsu (1777–1825)
                - Date Munenari, 8th daimyō of Uwajima, 1st Count (1818–1892; r. 1844–1858, 1st Count: 1884–1892)
                  - Muneatsu, Governor of Sendai, 1st Baron (1852–1911; Governor of Sendai: 1870–1871, Baron: 1888–1892). He had descendants in the male line.
            - Muranaga, 6th daimyō of Uwajima (1763–1836; r. 1794–1824)
              - Munetada, 7th daimyō of Uwajima (1792–1889; r. 1824–1844)
                - Munenori, 9th daimyō of Uwajima, 1st Marquess (1830–1906; r. 1858–1869; Governor of Uwajima: 1869–1871; Marquess: 1891)
                  - Munetsura, 2nd Marquess (1860–1923; 2nd Marquess: 1906–1923)
                  - Noritaka (1866–1944)
                    - Muneaki, 3rd Marquess (1905–1969; 3rd Marquess: 1923–1947)
                      - Munerei (1935–2008)
                        - Munenobu (b. 1971)
    - Munefusa (1646–1686). Head of the Tade sept of the Date clan
      - V. Yoshimura, 5th daimyō of Sendai (1680–1752; r. 1703–1743)
        - VI. Munemura, 6th daimyō of Sendai (1718–1756; r. 1743–1756)
          - VII. Shigemura, 7th daimyō of Sendai (1742–1796; r. 1756–1790)
            - VIII. Narimura, 8th daimyō of Sendai (1775–1796; r. 1790–1796)
              - IX. Chikamune, 9th daimyō of Sendai (9 April 1796 – 1812; r. 1796–1812)
              - X. Narimune, 10th daimyō of Sendai (15 October 1796 – 1819; r. 1812–1819)
        - Murayoshi (1743–1787)
          - Tamura Murasuke, 5th daimyō of Ichinoseki (1763–1808). Adopted to head the Tamura branch family
            - XI. Nariyoshi, 11th daimyō of Sendai (1798–1828; r. 1819–1827)
              - XIII. Yoshikuni, 13th daimyō of Sendai (1825–1874; r. 1841–1868)
                - XIV. Munemoto, 14th daimyō of Sendai, 1st Governor, 1st Count (1866–1917; r. 1868; Governor of Sendai: 1868–1870, family head 1870–1917, created 1st Count 1884).
                - Kunimune, 15th family head, 2nd Count (1870–1923; 15th family head and 2nd Count: 1917–1923)
                  - Okimune, 16th family head, 3rd Count (1906–1947; 16th family head and 3rd Count: 1923–1947)
                    - Sadamune, 17th family head (1937–1981; 17th family head: 1947–1981).
                      - Yasumune, 18th family head (b. 1959; 18th family head since 1981)
          - Munemitsu (1787–1843)
            - XII. Narikuni, 12th daimyō of Sendai (1817–1841; r. 1827–1841)

== Political structure ==
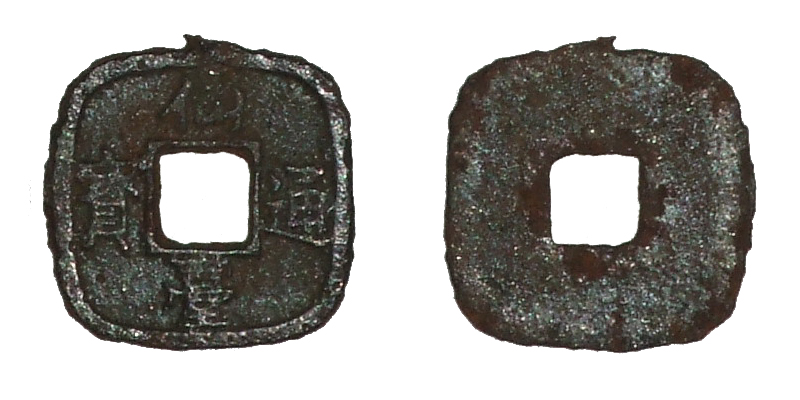
A Sendai Tsūhō, a provincial mon coin issued by the government of the Sendai domain

The Sendai domain, like many other domains across the country, had its political center in its castle town (what became the modern city of Sendai). However, some retainers had their personal landholdings scattered throughout the domain's territory, as it was largely contiguous. Their presence provided a secondary, more local level of supervision. Certain of the higher-ranked retainers of Sendai even separated from the main domain and founded their own territories. Mizusawa Domain was one such short-lived subdomain. The Ichinoseki Domain, ruled by the Tamura family, was another subdomain, and survived to the end of the Edo period.

== Retainer ranks and military structure ==
There were eleven main ranks into which the retainers of the Sendai domain were divided.

1. Ichimon 一門: blood relations of the Date clan. Held prestige but no actual political or administrative role.
2. Ikka 一家: The families who ran much of the high-level day-to-day affairs of the Date clan.
3. Jun ikka 準一家: Families who had lost their heads or had been incapacitated due to internal strife in the Date clan.
4. Ichizoku 一族: Fudai (long-standing) retainers of the Date clan.
5. Shukurō 宿労: Hereditary bugyō (magistrates).
6. Chakuza 着座: Retainers who had the right to report to the castle and present the lord with a sword and stirrups for new year's celebrations, and in return receive a cup of sake from the lord. This rank was founded after Date Masamune's tenure as lord.
7. Tachi-jō 太刀上: Retainers who had the right to present the lord with a sword at new year's festivities, and in return received a cup of sake from the lord. This was a rank founded after Masamune's tenure.
8. Meshidashi 召出: Retainers who had the right to appear at the domainal new year's festivities. As with chakuza and tachi-jō, this rank was founded after Masamune's time.
9. Heishi 平士 and Ōbanshi 大番士: The main body of Sendai's fighting force, the rank was organized in Date Masamune's time and revived during the tenure of the fourth daimyo Tsunamura. One kumi 組 (unit) consisted of 360 men, and the domain had 10 such units, setting their number at 3600.
10. Kumi-shi 組士: The men under the heishi and ōbanshi. Footmen, tea instructors, hawking assistants, entourage members, among others, all came from this category.
11. Sotsu 卒: Foot soldiers, coolies, lesser menials, and so on.

== Education ==
The domain's school was known as the Yōkendō 養賢堂. A medical school was established in Sendai in 1822.

== Boshin War ==
In 1868, the Sendai Domain did not have forces active in the Battle of Toba–Fushimi; however, it did have a liaison office in Kyoto which kept track of the developing situation. It was approached several times by the nascent imperial government with requests to assist in subduing Aizu. Sendai did provide some cooperation to the new government, and accepted its envoys, under Kujō Michitaka, that spring. However, Date Yoshikuni, the daimyō of Sendai, opposed the harshness shown against Aizu, saying that it was like "a sentence being passed on one who never had a trial". Despite its efforts at negotiating on behalf of Aizu, Sendai was largely cooperative with the Kyoto government for much of the spring of 1868. This came to an end in May 1868, when Sendai men discovered that the Chōshū officer Sera Shūzō (who had accompanied the imperial delegation) had written a slanderous letter indicating a desire to describe "all in the north to be enemies," and to ask for reinforcements to subdue the entire region by armed force.

We have no soldiers under the command of the (Imperial) Commander-in-Chief ... Sendai and Yonezawa have submitted appeals, and they are probably working with Aizu ... therefore we should go to Kyoto, and describe the situation in the north, viewing all in Ōu (Mutsu and Dewa) as enemies ...

— Sera Shūzō

Naturally, the Sendai men were outraged that they too were to be punished despite their cooperation. A group of these men killed Sera, and pushed ahead with Sendai sponsorship of a northern coalition of domains. This became the Ōuetsu Reppan Dōmei.

== After Boshin ==
The Sendai domain was punished for its actions against the imperial army in the Boshin War, though not as severely as Aizu. Sendai's holdings were reduced; it was also made the center of the new government's operations in the north. Shiroishi Castle was also taken from Sendai, and given to the Nanbu clan which had been newly moved from Morioka Castle.

As with all others, the Sendai domain was abolished in 1871, by the haihan chiken order.

== See also ==
- List of Han
- Moniwa Motonori
