= Aoba Castle =

Japanese castle in Sendai, Japan

Aoba Castle 青葉城
- Sendai, Miyagi Prefecture, Japan
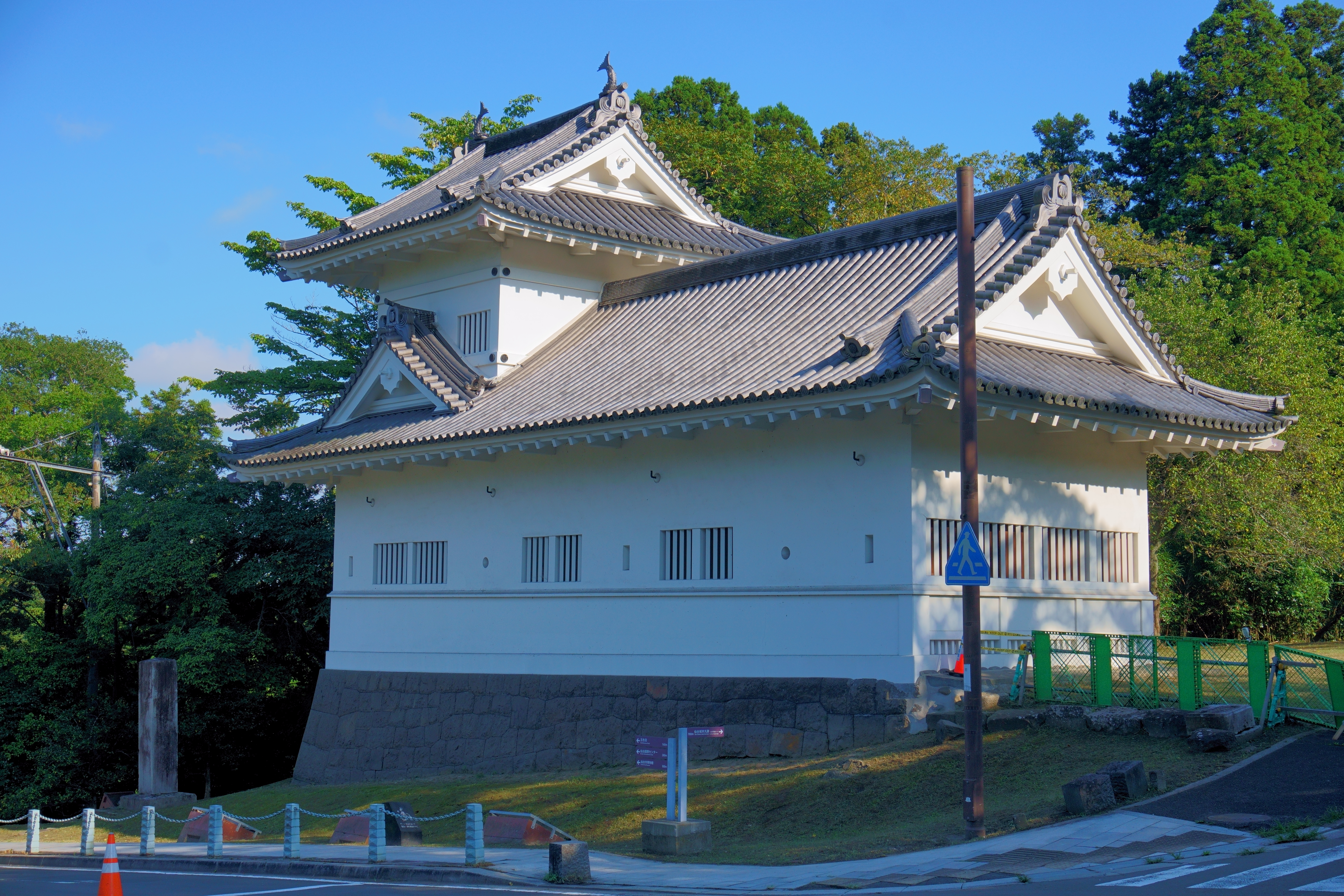
- Reconstructed wakiyagura of Aoba Castle

Site information
- Type: Hilltop-style Japanese castle
- Open to the public: yes

Location
- Coordinates: 38°15′09″N 140°51′22″E

Site history
- Built: 1601
- Built by: Date Masamune
- In use: Edo period

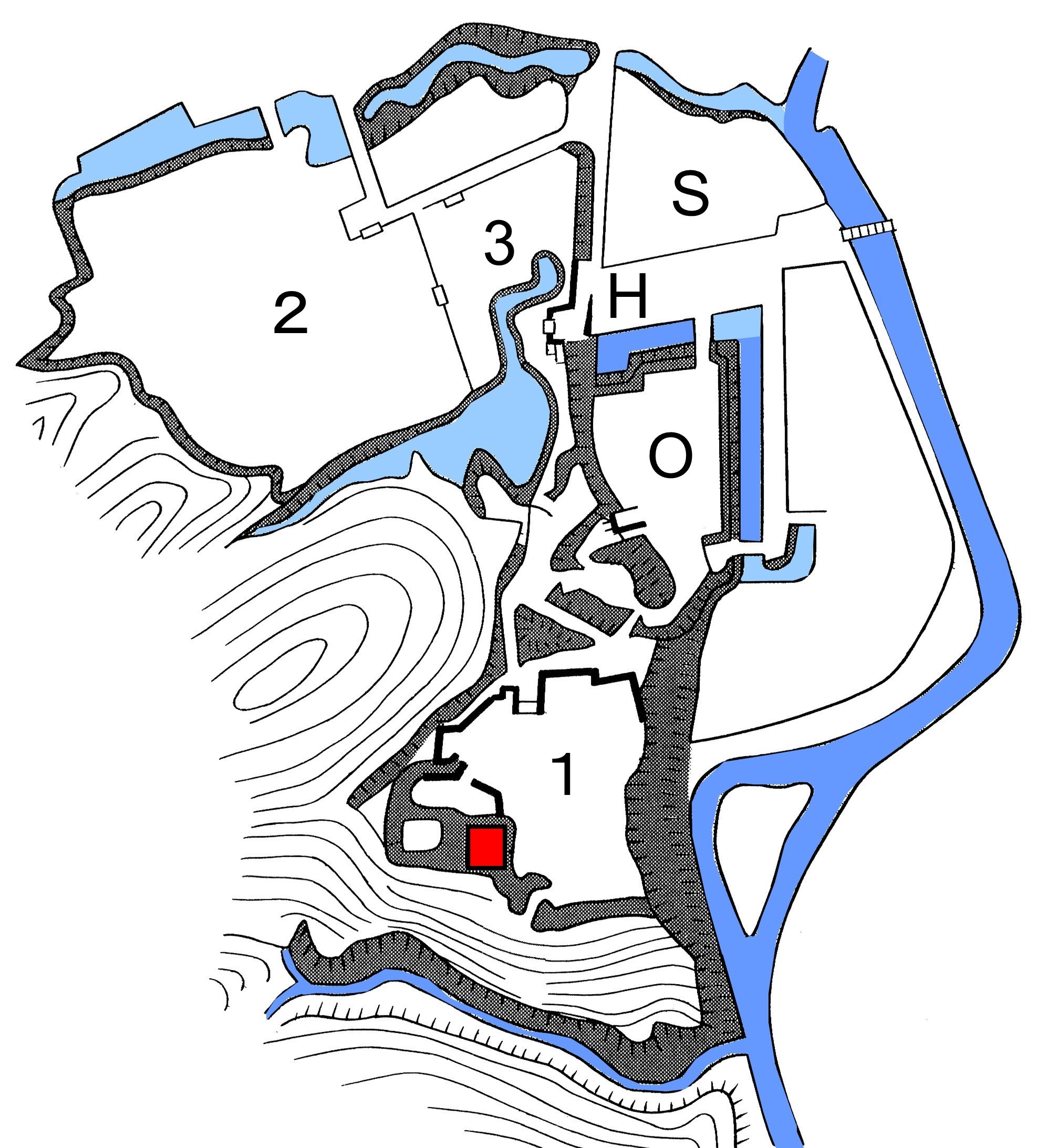
Layout of Aoba Castle

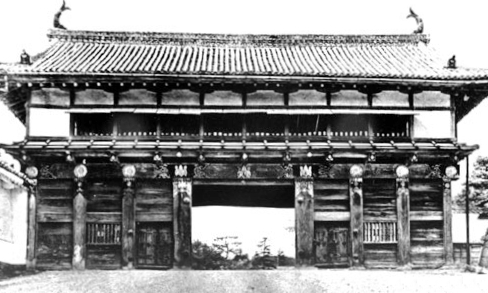
Old Ōtemon in July 1938. It was destroyed by fire during the Sendai bombing in 1945.

Aoba Castle (青葉城, Aoba-jō) is a Japanese castle located in Sendai, Miyagi Prefecture. Throughout the Edo period, Aoba Castle was home to the Date clan, daimyō of Sendai Domain. The castle was also known as Sendai-jō (仙台城) or as Gojō-rō (五城楼). In 2003, the castle ruins were designated a National Historic Site.

== Design ==
Aoba Castle is located on a plateau overlooking the city of Sendai, on the opposing bank of the Hirose river. The site is protected by cliffs to the south and east and by a forest to the west. This forest was strictly guarded in the Edo period and is a rare survivor of the original virgin forests of Honshū. The area is now managed as a botanical garden by Tohoku University.

The castle hill is partially surrounded by the Hirose river to the north and east, and a steep slope protects the south. The honmaru (inner bailey) is about 115 meters high and is a roughly square-shaped area 250 meters long surrounded by stone walls, in some places 15 meters high. It contained the foundation for the tenshu, (equivalent to the main keep of European castles); however, only the foundation base was ever built. Instead, the honmaru was protected by four three-story yagura. The daimyō residence within the honmaru was built in the flamboyant Momoyama style, and contemporaries compared it with Toyotomi Hideyoshi's legendary Jurakudai Palace in Kyoto. North of the honmaru was the ni-no-maru (second bailey) and the san-no-maru (third bailey), followed by an area containing the residences of the highest samurai officials of the domain. The ni-no-maru was used for both governmental functions and was the location of the main residence of the daimyō. The honmaru was reserved only for certain ceremonial functions. A bridge across the Hirose river led to the higashi-no-maru (east bailey), which also had the ōte-mon (main gate) of the castle.

== History ==
The location of Aoba Castle, a small hill called Mount Aoba, was the site of a fortified residence of a branch of the Shimazu clan, the nominal kokushi of Mutsu Province from the early Kamakura period. In the Muromachi period, it was controlled by the jizamurai Kokubun clan, which was in turn destroyed by the Date clan.

Following the Battle of Sekigahara in 1601, the area was visited by Tokugawa Ieyasu, who renamed Mount Aoba "Sendai". The first daimyō of Sendai domain, Date Masamune, began construction of the castle with the inner bailey and san-no-maru bailey at the base of the hill. Work on the castle, including the san-no-maru bailey and numerous gates, was completed by Date Tadamune in 1637.

After completion, the castle served as the headquarters of the Date clan and administrative center of Mutsu Province under the Tokugawa shogunate.

The castle was destroyed repeatedly by earthquakes and fires, notably in 1616, 1648, 1668, and 1710. More than six major earthquakes occurred between 1710 and 1868, but there is no record of major damage.

During the Bakumatsu period, the castle was one of the nerve centers of the Ōuetsu Reppan Dōmei during the Boshin War, as Date Yoshikuni was leader of the pro-Tokugawa alliance. Taken over by the Meiji government in the aftermath of Sendai's surrender, it was partially dismantled in the 1870s, and the grounds were given over to the Imperial Japanese Army, which used it as the base for the Sendai Garrison (later the IJA 2nd Division). A large fire in 1882 destroyed many of the remaining structures of the castle.

In 1902, a Shinto Gokoku shrine (護国神社, Gokoku-jinja) honoring the war dead was established. In 1931, two of the few remaining structures of the castle, the omotemon gate and the wakiyagura tower, were designated as National Treasures by the Japanese government. However, these structures and all else in the castle were destroyed completely on 10 July 1945 by the United States during the Bombing of Sendai during World War II.

During the occupation of Japan, the castle site came under the control of the United States Army, which razed any remaining Edo-period structures. It was returned to Japan in 1957. In 1961, the Sendai City Museum was built on the site of the san-no-maru enclosure. Over the following decades, the stone base, a few walls, and some wooden structures have been rebuilt to increase the tourist potential of the site, and in 2006, Aoba Castle was designated one of the 100 Fine Castles of Japan.

== Literature ==
- Benesch, Oleg and Ran Zwigenberg (2019). Japan's Castles: Citadels of Modernity in War and Peace. Cambridge: Cambridge University Press. p. 374. ISBN 9781108481946.
- De Lange, William (2021). An Encyclopedia of Japanese Castles. Groningen: Toyo Press. p. 600. ISBN 978-9492722300.
- Schmorleitz, Morton S. (1974). Castles in Japan. Tokyo: Charles E. Tuttle Co. pp. 144–145. ISBN 0-8048-1102-4.
- Motoo, Hinago (1986). Japanese Castles. Tokyo: Kodansha. p. 200. ISBN 0-87011-766-1.
- Mitchelhill, Jennifer (2004). Castles of the Samurai: Power and Beauty. Tokyo: Kodansha. p. 112. ISBN 4-7700-2954-3.
- Turnbull, Stephen (2003). Japanese Castles 1540-1640. Osprey Publishing. p. 64. ISBN 1-84176-429-9.
