= Date clan =

Japanese noble family

Date 伊達
- Mon: Sendaizasa
- Home province: Mutsu
- Parent house: Isa clan
- Titles: Various
- Founder: Date Tomomune
- Current head: Date Yasumune
- Founding year: c. 1189
- Dissolution: still extant
- Ruled until: 1871, abolition of the han system
- Cadet branches: Tamura clan (restored); Uwajima; Yoshida

The Date clan (伊達氏, Date-shi; DA-tay) is a Japanese samurai kin group.

== History ==
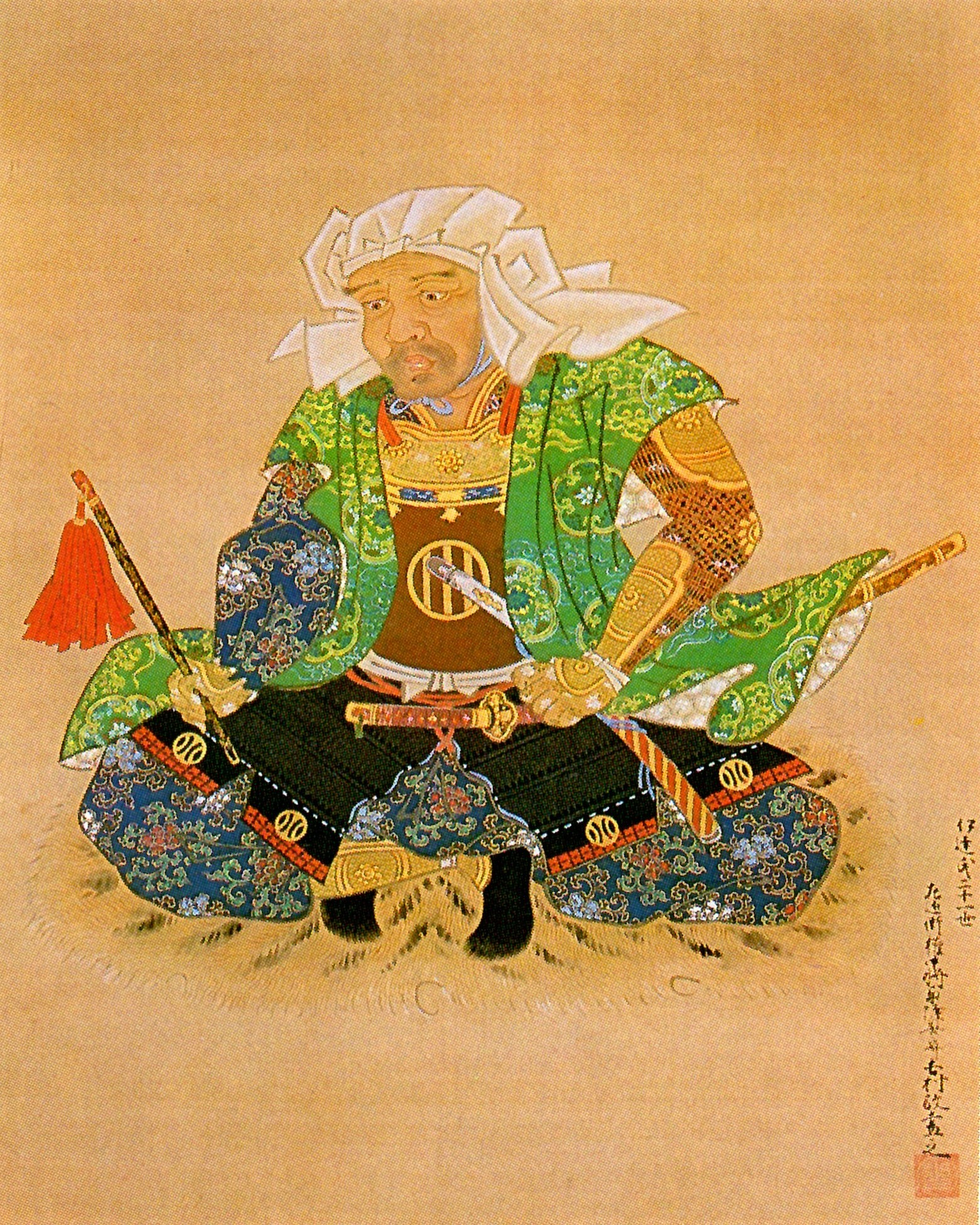
Date Tomomune, founder of the Date clan

The Date family was founded in the early Kamakura period (1185–1333) by Isa Tomomune who originally came from the Isa district of Hitachi Province (now Ibaraki Prefecture), and was a descendant of Fujiwara no Uona (721–783) in the sixteenth generation. The family took its name from the Date district (now Date City in Fukushima Prefecture) of Mutsu Province which had been awarded in 1189 to Isa Tomomune by Minamoto no Yoritomo, the first Kamakura shōgun, for his assistance in the Genpei War and in Minamoto no Yoritomo's struggle for power with his brother, Minamoto no Yoshitsune.

During the Nanboku-chō Wars in the 1330s, the Date supported the Imperial Southern Court of Emperor Go-Daigo through Kitabatake Akiie, who had been appointed Commander in Chief (or Chinjufu Shōgun) of the Defense of the North, by the emperor.

As warlords gained and lost power in the Sengoku period, trying to unite the country, the Date, along with a handful of other powerful families, did all they could to retain independence and dominance over their section of the land (in the case of the Date, the far north). Though not gaining the fame or power of the likes of Oda Nobunaga, Uesugi Kenshin, or Toyotomi Hideyoshi, they resisted the invasions of these warlords into the north. Date Masamune (1567–1636) contributed in particular to this effort, consolidating the families of the north into alliances against the major warlords. In 1589, Masamune with the help of former Ashina's samurai, Inawashiro Morikuni, seized the Aizu Domain of the Ashina at the Battle of Suriagehara; and he installed himself at Kurokawa Castle in Wakamatsu Province. However, the following year, Hideyoshi triumphed over the Hōjo of Odawara; and Hideyoshi then obliged Masamune to be content with the fief of Yonezawa (300,000 koku).

Masamune ultimately gained some degree of independence by supporting Tokugawa Ieyasu. Ieyasu granted the Date much of the north, and yet the Date were not fully trusted. Despite the Date contribution of reinforcements for the Tokugawa during the battle of Sekigahara, the Date were viewed as a threat. In the Edo period, the Date were identified as one of the tozama or outsider clans, in contrast with the fudai or insider daimyō clans which were hereditary vassals or allies of the Tokugawa clan.

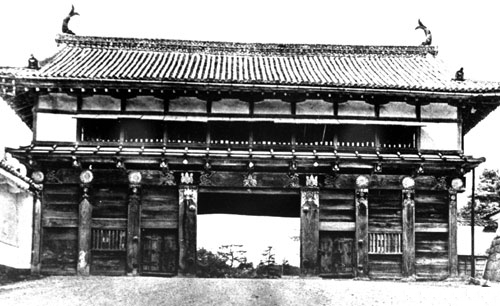
Main Gate of Sendai Castle (1938)

In 1600, Ieyasu charged the Date to fight against Uesugi Kagekatsu; and, with the assistance of Mogami Yoshiteru, Masamune's forces defeated Naoe Kanetsugu. In recognition of this success in battle, Masamune was granted the fiefs in twelve districts which had been held until that time by the Uesugi clan. The Date established themselves at Sendai (620,000 koku). By 1658, Masamune changed the name of the Uesugi's castle at Iwatezawa to Sendai Castle. The feudal daimyō were sometimes identified with the suffix "-kō" (duke, ruler of the land), preceded by the name of a place or a castle, e.g., Sendai-kō was one of the names by which Date Masamune was known.

Succession disputes erupted; there were a number of direct descendants of Masamune, and many kinsmen and hereditary vassals of the Date who resided nearby held estates of at least 10,000 koku, and thus had some influence. In 1660, Date Tsunamune was arrested in Edo, for drunkenness and debauchery; the charges were generally believed to have been true. Tsunamune was condemned to excavate the moats which encircled the shōgun's Edo Castle. In 1660, he was ordered to supervise and pay for enhancing the north-east moat running from Megane-bashi to the Ushigome gate. The initial charges of licentious living are now believed to have been encouraged heavily by certain vassals and kinsmen in the north. These vassals and kinsmen appealed to the Council of Elders in Edo that Tsunamune should not be considered fit to rule, and that his son Date Tsunamura, great-grandson of Masamune, should become the daimyō (lord) of the Date han (fief). Thus, Tsunamura became daimyō, under the guardianship of his uncles, Date Munekatsu and Muneyoshi.

Ten years of violence and conflict followed in the north, reaching a climax in 1671 when Aki Muneshige, a powerful relative of the Date, complained to the shogunate of the mismanagement of the fief under Tsunamura and his uncles. The episode that followed is so complex and dramatic as to warrant becoming a well-known story known as the Date Sōdō (Date Disturbance) and a theatrical play as well. Aki was summoned to Edo to argue his case before various councils and officials, and was involved in a number of interrogations, examinations and meetings, as were several other retainers of the Date. One retainer in particular, Harada Munesuke, was a supporter of Tsunamura and his uncles and, it is said, made a poor impression at Edo. At one point, Aki came upon Harada waiting to meet with some of the officials, and Aki began shouting insults. Swords were then drawn, and Aki was killed. Harada was killed moments after, by the officials or their guards. The official verdict was that Harada drew first; the Harada family was disbanded and though Tsunamura was affirmed as the proper daimyō, his uncles were punished.

Though the Date are most well known for their power in the north, Date Hidemune, the second son of Masamune, enjoyed a fief of 100,000 koku on Shikoku.

== Successive heads of the Date clan ==
1. Date Tomomune (1129–1199)
2. Date Munemura (1173–1251)
3. Date Yoshihiro (1185–1256)
4. Date Masayori (1227–1301)
5. Date Munetsuna (1254–1317)
6. Date Motomune (d. 1335)
7. Date Yukitomo (1291–1348)
8. Date Munetō (1324–1385)
9. Date Masamune (1353–1405)
10. Date Ujimune (1371–1412)
11. Date Mochimune (1393–1469)
12. Date Shigemune (1435–1487)
13. Date Hisamune (1453–1514)
14. Date Tanemune (1488-1565)
15. Date Harumune (1519-1578)
16. Date Terumune (1544-1585)
17. Date Masamune (1567 - 1636)
18. Date Tadamune (1600 - 1658)
19. Date Tsunamune (1640 - 1711)
20. Date Tsunamura (1659 - 1719)
21. Date Yoshimura (1680 - 1752)
22. Date Munemura (1718 - 1756)
23. Date Shigemura (1742 - 1796)
24. Date Narimura (1775 - 1796)
25. Date Chikamune (1796 - 1812)
26. Date Narimune (1796 - 1819)
27. Date Nariyoshi (1798 - 1828)
28. Date Narikuni (1817 - 1841)
29. Date Yoshikuni (1825 - 1874)
30. Date Munemoto (1866 - 1917)
31. Kunimune Date (1870–1923)
32. Okimune Date (1906–1947)
33. Sadamune Date (1937–1981)
34. Yasumune Date (b. 1959)

== Genealogy ==
The tozama Date clan originated during the 12th century in Shimōsa Province. They claim descent from the Fujiwara clan.

The branches of the tozama Date clan include the following:

- The senior branch of the Date were daimyō at Date in Mutsu province from the 12th century; and then, in 1601, they transferred the seat of their clan holdings to Sendai. From the early 17th century until 1868, the Date continued to hold Sendai Domain (620,000 koku) in Mutsu Province. The head of this Senior clan line was ennobled as an hereditary "Count" in the Meiji period.
- This senior branch of the Date produced a nominal offshoot or "side branch". Date Tadamune (1599–1658), a son of Masamune, produced more than one son. Tadamune's second son, Muneyoshi, revived the name of Tamura, an ancient Mutsu family name which had been relinquished by Masamune. Date Muneyoshi or Tamura Muneyoshi (1637–1678) settled himself at Ichinoseki domain (30,000 koku) in Mutsu Province (now in Iwate Prefecture), where his descendants resided up through 1868. The head of this clan line was ennobled as an hereditary "Viscount" in the Meiji period.
- A cadet branch of the Date was created in 1614; and this clan line was established at Uwajima Domain (100,000 koku) in Iyo Province. Date Muneki (1817–1882) was a prominent member of this Cadet branch. He played an important role in the early days of the Meiji Restoration, and he was among the first to argue persistently for the suppression of shogunate powers. As The head of this clan line, Muneki and his heirs were ennobled as an hereditary "Marquis" in the Meiji period.
- An additional cadet branch of the Date was created in 1657. In that year, a separate clan line was installed at Yoshida Castle (30,000 koku) in Iyo Province. The head of this clan line was ennobled as an hereditary "Viscount" in the Meiji period.

=== Clan temple in Edo ===
In the Edo period, Tōzen-ji was considered the family temple of various clans, including the Date clan of Sendai. Other clans considering Tōzen-ji to have been a clan temple were the Ikeda clan of Ōmi Province, the Inaba clan of Usuki Domain in Bungo Province, the Suwa clan of Shinshū, the Tamura of Ichinoseki, and the Mōri clan of Saeki in Bungo Province.

=== Clan shrine in Sendai ===
The Date clan's tutelary shrine, Kameoka Hachimangū, survives as a local shrine in Sendai.

== Notable clan members ==
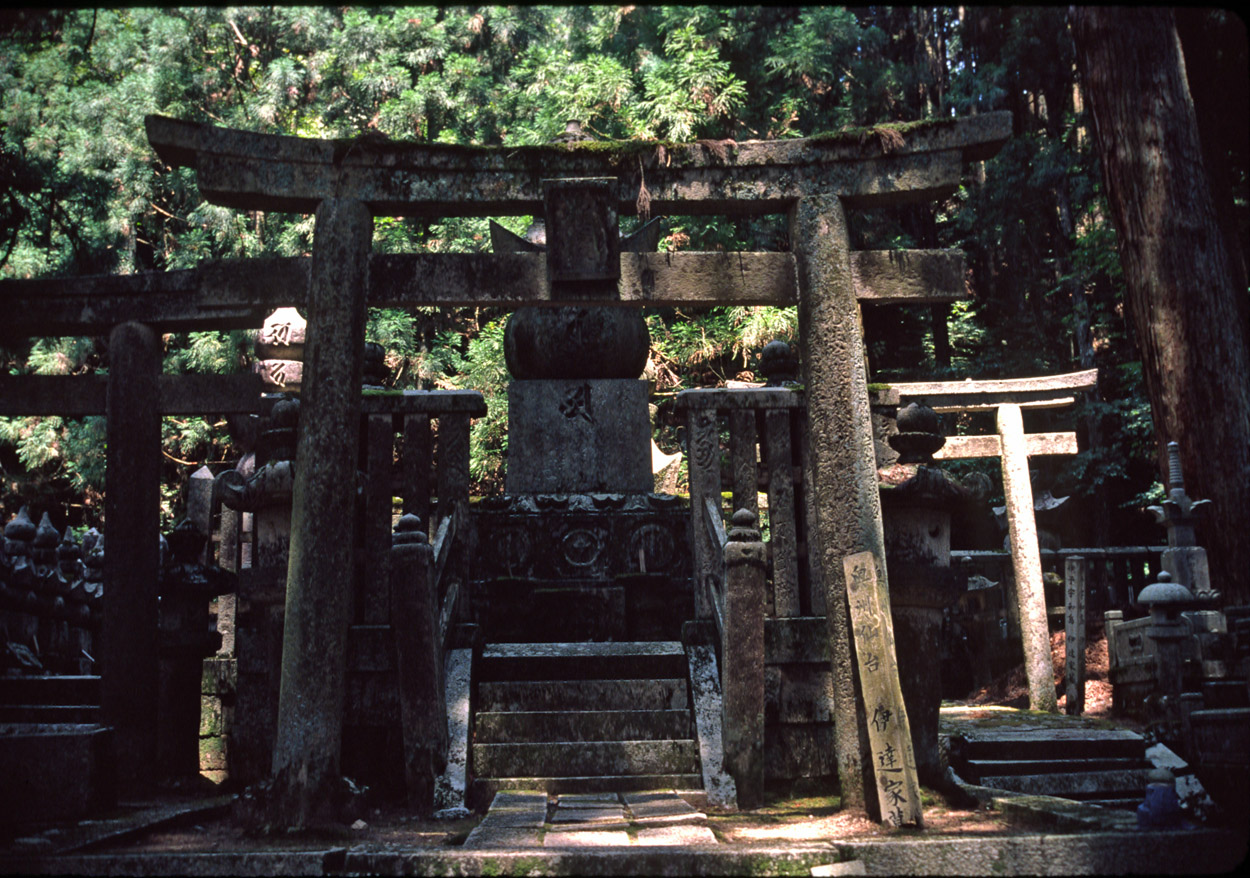
Grave of Ōshū Sendai Date clan at Mount Kōya

Notable members of the clan listed by their date of birth, excluding clan leaders:

=== Sixteenth century ===
- Megohime (1568 - 1653) - daughter of Tamura Kiyoaki; wife of Date Masamune
- Date Kojiro (1578–1590) - son of Date Terumune
- Date Hidemune (1591–1658) – son of Date Masamune daimyō of Iyo domain in Shikoku
- Date Tadamune (1599–1658) – son of Date Masamune
- Date Munezane (1613–1665) – son of Date Masamune
- Date Munekatsu – son of Date Masamune – guardian of Tsunamura

=== Seventeenth century ===
- Date Munetomo – son of Date Munekatsu
- Date Munetsuna (1603–1618)
- Date Munenobu (1603–1627)
- Date Munehiro (1612–1644)
- Date Munetoki (1615–1653)
- Date Torachiyomaru (1624–1630)
- Date Muneyoshi (1625–1678) – son of Date Tadamune – guardian of Tsunamura
- Date Mitsumune (1627–1645) – son of Date Tadamune
- Date Munetoshi (1634–1708)
- Date Munezumi (1636–1708)
- Date Sourin (1640–1670)
- Date Munefusa (1646–1686)
- Date Munenori (1673–1694)
- Date Muratoyo (1682–1737)
- Date Muraoki (1683–1767)

=== Eighteenth century ===
- Date Murasumi (1717–1735)
- Date Muranobu (1720–1765)
- Date Murakata (1745–1790)
- Date Murayoshi (1778–1820)

=== Nineteenth century and after Meiji restoration ===
- Date Yoshitaka (1812–1862)
- Date Muneki (1817–1882)
- Date Munenari (1818–1892)
- Yasuko Date (1827–1904)
- Date Kuninori (1830–1874)
- Date Kuninao (1834–1891)
- Date Kuninari (1841–1904)
- Date Junnosuke (1892–1948)

=== Side branches ===
They were born to the Date clan but were nominally adopted by other families. The first name is the person who was nominally adopted.

- Tamura Muneyoshi (1637–1678)
  - Tamura Takeaki (1656–1708) – first Tamura daimyō of Ichinoseki han
  - Tamura Akihiro (1659–1696)
  - Tamura Akinao (1662–1706)
  - Tamura Akinori (1664–1733)
  - Tamura Haruchiyo (1686–1693)
  - Tamura Nobuaki (1703–1725)
  - Tamura Muranobu (1723–1777)
- Shiraishi Gorokichi (1638–1644)
- Uesugi Yoshifusa (1720–1742)
  - Uesugi Yoshitoki (1742–1784)
  - Uesugi Yoshinaga (?–?)
  - Uesugi Yositatsu (?–?)
  - Uesugi Yoshimasa (?–?)
  - Usesugi Yoshitoyo (d. 1861)

== Retainers and vassals ==
These families were vassals of the Date clan. Notable members are listed by their date of birth.

=== Oniniwa ===
- Oniniwa Motozane (1412–1590) – founder of Oniniwa clan
- Oniniwa Yoshinao (1513–1586)
- Masuda Kita (1539–1690) – Yoshinao's Daughter/Tsunamoto's half-sister
- Moniwa Tadamoto (Oniniwa Tsunamoto/Moniwa Tsunamoto) (1549–1640) – Toyotomi Hideyoshi bestowed the surname "Moniwa" as the new name for the Oniniwa clan.
- Moniwa Yoshimoto (Yoshitsuna) (1575–1663) – son of Tadamoto/Tsunamoto
- Harada Tsutame (c. 1598 – 1671) – The wife of Harada Munesuke; adopted child of Tadamoto (Tsunamoto)

=== Katakura ===
- Katakura Kagetsuna
- Katakura Kita

=== Rusu ===
- Rusu Masakage

=== Watari ===
- Date Shigezane

=== Shiroishi ===
- Shiroishi Munezane

== Popular culture ==
- The Date Clan is heavily featured in the anime series Masamune Datenicle.
- The Date are a playable faction in Shogun 2.
- Date is a playable nation in Europa Universalis IV.

== See also ==
- Battle of Motomiya-Ji
- Date (surname)
- Kōriyama Campaign
- Tenshin Shōden Katori Shintō-ryū— "Many Date retainers had trained in Katori Shintō-ryū and developed their own distinctive style."
- Uwajima Domain
