= Sendai City Museum =

- 仙台市博物館
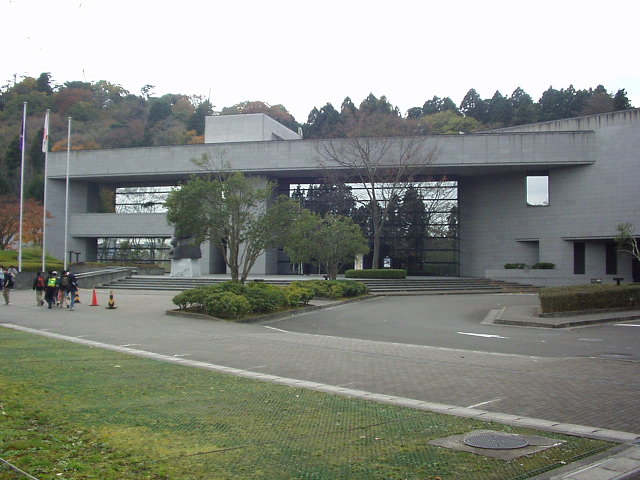
- Interactive map of the Sendai City Museum area

General information
- Location: 26 Kawauchi, Aoba-ku, Sendai, Miyagi Prefecture, Japan
- Coordinates: 38.256065°N 140.856685°E
- Opened: October 1961

Technical details
- Floor area: 10,833 sq.m

Website
- Official website

The Sendai City Museum (仙台市博物館, Sendai-shi Hakubutsukan) is the main museum of Sendai, Japan, and is located in the former Third Bailey of Sendai Castle.

The museum displays various artifacts related to the Date clan and the history of Sendai. Date Masamune's famous suit of armor and artifacts related to Hasekura Tsunenaga's visit to Rome are sometimes on display. Other historical artifacts can be seen in various temples and museums in the city, such as the Zuihoden Mausoleum.

== See also ==
- List of National Treasures of Japan (historical materials)
