= Tamura clan =

Japanese samurai clan

Tamura 田村
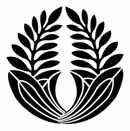
- Tamura clan emblem
- Home province: Mutsu Province
- Parent house: Sakanoue clan
- Titles: Various
- Founder: Sakanoue no Tamuramaro
- Final ruler: Tamura Takaaki
- Founding year: Heian period
- Dissolution: still extant
- Ruled until: 1873 (Abolition of the han system)

The Tamura clan (田村氏, Tamura-shi) was a Japanese samurai clan who ruled Ichinoseki Domain in Mutsu Province during the Edo period Tokugawa shogunate. The family was closely related to the Date clan of Sendai Domain through intermarriage.

== Origins ==
The Tamura clan claimed descent from Sakanoue no Tamuramaro, and were local gōzoku controlling Tamura shōen (later Tamura District) in what is now central Fukushima Prefecture since the Heian period. The Sakanoue clan was a cadet branch of the famous Yamato no Aya clan, an immigrant which originated in Baekje of Korea.

== Sengoku period ==
The clan rose to become a minor daimyō during the Sengoku period. In 1504, the Tamura clan moved from Moriyama to Miharu Castle in what is now Miharu, Fukushima. As a defense network, the clan set up its retainers in forty-eight subsidiary castles and outposts in the area.

However, although the Tamura clan pledged allegiance to Toyotomi Hideyoshi at the Siege of Odawara, Hideyoshi felt that their efforts were insufficient, and dispossessed the clan in 1598, giving their territory to the Date clan. The Tamura survived as retainers to the Date.

== Edo period ==
The wife of Date Masamune was Megohime (1568–1653), also known as Lady Tamura, since she was the daughter and only child of Tamura Kiyoaki. Her paternal grandmother and maternal grandmother were also both daughters of Date Tanemune, making her Masamune’s second cousin. She had four children, the eldest of which (Date Tadamune) was Masamune’s successor to Sendai Domain. Although Masamune had agreed that their second son should succeed to the Tamura clan, this son (Date Munetsuna) died at the age of 16. In order to restore the Tamura clan, Date Tadamune’s son Date Muneyoshi was ordered to take the Tamura surname.

The restored Tamura clan was given 10,000 koku in Iwagasaki, Kurihara in what is now Miyagi Prefecture. When the young Date Tsunamura became daimyō of Sendai in 1660, Muneyoshi gained an additional 20,000 koku from territories in what is now Ichinoseki, Iwate. In addition, he became a guardian of Date Tsunamura together with Date Munekatsu. In 1662, Muneyoshi was transferred to the newly created Iwanuma Domain in the Natori District, becoming daimyō of a subsidiary domain to Sendai Domain.

In 1695, his son Tamura Tatsuaki, transferred the seat of the domain to Ichinoseki Domain (30,000 koku). The clan remained at Ichinoseki until the Meiji restoration. The Ichinoseki holdings were completely surrounded by Sendai Domain.

Ichinoseki domain forces took part in the Ōuetsu Reppan Dōmei's attack on the Akita Domain in the late summer of 1868.

In the Meiji era, the former daimyō of Ichinoseki, Tamura Takaaki, was created viscount in the new kazoku peerage system.

== Family Heads ==
- Tamura Kiyoaki

=== Main line (Ichinoseki) ===
As lord of Iwanuma

- Tamura Muneyoshi (1637–1678)
- Tamura Tatsuaki (1656–1708)

As lord of Ichinoseki

- Tamura Takeaki (1656–1708)
- Tamura Nobuaki (1670–1727)
- Tamura Muneaki (1707–1755)
- Tamura Murataka (1737–1782)
- Tamura Murasuke (1763–1808)
- Tamura Muneaki (1784–1827)
- Tamura Kuniaki (1817–1840)
- Tamura Kuniyuki (1820–1857)
- Tamura Yukiaki (1850–1867)
- Tamura Kuniyoshi (1852–1887)
- Tamura Takaaki (1858–1922)
- Admiral Tamura Hiroaki (1875-1945)

== See also ==
- Ichinoseki Domain
- Sendai Domain
