= Tamura Muneyoshi =

- 田村宗良
- Born: June 11, 1637
- Died: May 16, 1678 (aged 40); Edo, Japan
- Burial place: Tōzen-ji, Takanawa, Edo
- Spouse: daughter of Yamaguchi Shigeyuki
- Children: Tamura Tatsuaki
- Parents: Date Tadamune (father); Fusa-no-kata (mother)

Daimyō of Iwanuma Domain
- In office 1660–1671

Tamura Muneyoshi (田村宗良; June 11, 1637 – May 16, 1678) was a Japanese daimyō of Iwanuma Domain in Mutsu Province of early-Edo period Japan

Muneyoshi was the third son of Date Tadamune, the 2nd daimyō of Sendai Domain. His mother, Fusa, was a concubine and the daughter of Mitamura Matauemon. His childhood name was Kamechiyo (亀千代). From 1639, under his father's orders, he was raised by Suzuki Motonobu, a vassal of Sendai Domain, in Ōsaki, Shida District, as heir to the Suzuki clan. In 1649, at the time of his genpuku ceremony, he changed his name to Suzuki Muneyoshi (鈴木宗良).

However, in 1653, the Tamura clan was revived, as requested by Megohime (Muneyoshi's grandmother, Date Masamune's wife) via her will, and Muneyoshi became Tamura Muneyoshi, with holdings totalling 10,000 koku in Iwagasaki, Kurihara, in what is now Miyagi Prefecture.

In 1658, following the death of Date Tadamune, the second daimyō of Sendai Domain. Sendai Domain was inherited by the young and impressionable Date Tsunamune, and the clan elders appointed Muneyoshi and his half-brother, Date Munekatsu as guardians. In 1660, Muneyoshi gained an additional 20,000 koku in what is now Ichinoseki, along with the courtesy title of Ukyō-no-daifu and Court rank of Junior Fifth Rank, Lower Grade. Munekatsu's daughter-in-law was the daughter of Tairō Sakai Tadakiyo. Through these connections, the Date Munekatsu and Tamura Muneyoshi accused Tadamune of drunkenness and debauchery, who then removed from office for misrule and was confined to a secondary clan residence in Edo.

The infant Date Tsunamura was made daimyō of Sendai under the guardianship of his uncles. In 1662, Muneyoshi transferred his seat to what is now the city of Iwanuma, Miyagi and officially became daimyō of Iwanuma Domain, a subsidiary domain of Sendai, based in what is now the city of Iwanuma, Miyagi. He received the courtesy title of Oki-no-kami in 1670. According to waka poetry written about him, Muneyoshi had a mild personality and was popular, in contrast to the events of the Date Sōdō.

The ten years during which Date Munekatsu and Tamura Muneyoshi ruled in place of the under-age Date Tsunamura were marked by violence and conflict in Sendai Domain. Events reached a climax in 1671 when Aki Muneshige, a powerful relative of the Date clan, complained to the shogunate of the mismanagement of the fief under Tsunamura and his uncles. In the ensuring Date Sōdō, Muneyoshi was relieved of his offices in 1671 and placed under house arrest. He was pardoned in 1672. In 1678, he died at the clan's Edo residence at the age of 42. He died at age 42, and his grave is at the clan mortuary temple of Tōzen-ji in Takanawa, Edo.

== See also ==
- Tamura clan
- Date clan

Preceded by -none-	1st Lord of Iwanuma; 1660-1678	Succeeded by Tamura Tatsuaki
