= Iyo-Yoshida Domain =

Administrative division in Japan during the Edo period

Iyo-Yoshida Domain 宇和島藩
- Domain of Japan
- 1657–1871
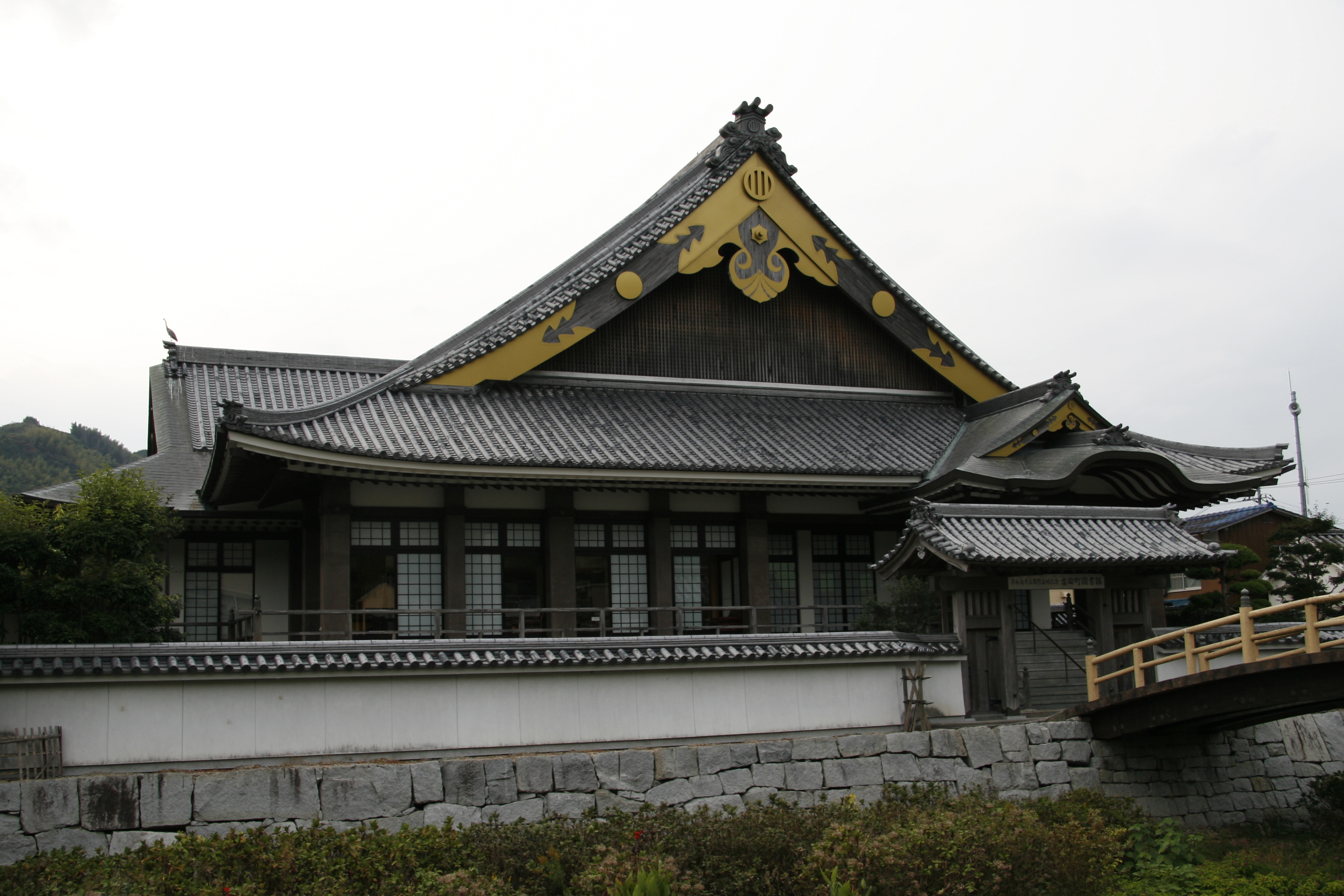
- Reconstructed Yoshida Jin'ya in Uwajima, Ehime

- Mon of the Date clan
- Capital: Yoshida jin'ya
- Area
  - Coordinates: 33°17′00.56″N 132°32′18.70″E
- Historical era: Edo period
  - Established: 1657
  - Abolition of the han system: 1871
- Contained within
  - Province: Iyo
- Today part of: Ehime Prefecture

Location of Yoshida Jin'ya
Iyo-Yoshida Domain (Japan)

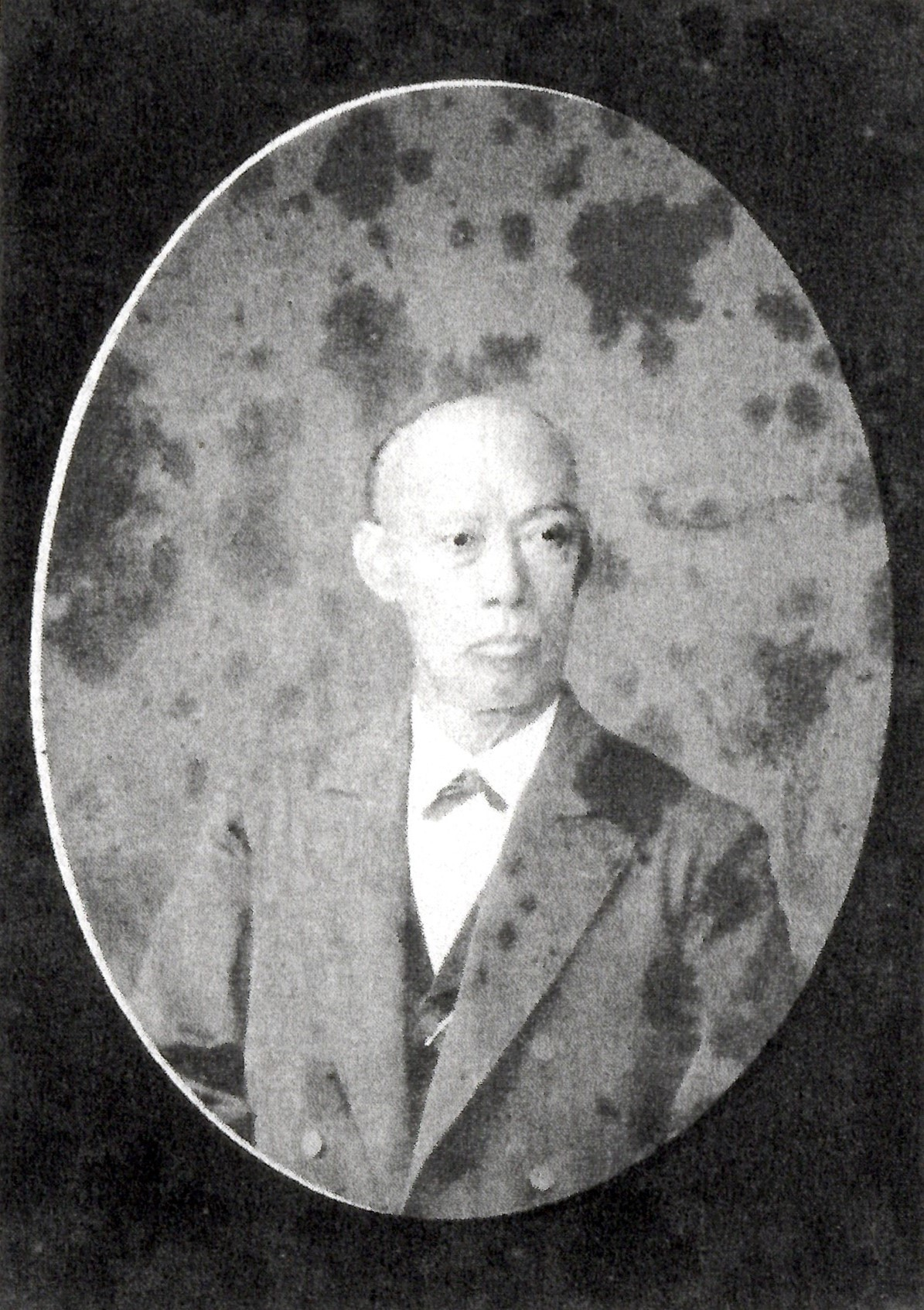
Date Munemichi, 8th daimyō of Iyo-Yoshida, photographed post-Meiji restoration

Iyo-Yoshida Domain (伊予吉田藩, Iyo-Yoshida-han) was a feudal domain under the Tokugawa shogunate of Edo period Japan, controlling all of Tosa Province in what is now western Ehime Prefecture on the island of Shikoku. It was centered around Yoshida jin'ya, located in what is now part of the city of Uwajima, Ehime, and was ruled throughout its history by a cadet branch of the tozama daimyō Date clan. Iyo-Yoshida Domain was dissolved in the abolition of the han system in 1871 and is now part of Ehime Prefecture.

== History ==
In 1614, Date Hidemune was awarded the 100,000 koku Uwajima Domain by Shogun Tokugawa Hidetada, and moved into Uwajima Castle the following year. In 1658, Hidemune died, making his third son Munetoshi his successor; however, Hidemune's will split the domain. Munetoshi received only 70,000 koku, and his younger brother Date Munezumi was given 30,000 koku and allowed to establish a cadet branch of the clan and subsidiary domain called Iyo-Yoshida Domain. The will was received with consternation by Uwajima Domain, which evidently had no prior knowledge of it, and led to decades of conflict between the two houses.

It is unknown why Hidemune took this action, and the most common theory is that Munezumi was Hidemune's favorite and was bequeathed the portion of the estate that Hidemune had intended to set aside for his own retirement revenues. However, another theory is that Munezumi envied his older brother, and therefore plotted with his uncle Date Munekatsu (the tenth son of Date Masamune) of Ichinoseki Domain to falsify the will. Munetoshi wrote a letter to Date Tadamune asserting that the will had to have been a forgery, as Hidemune's condition at the time it was dated was so bad that be could not even hold a brush to write with. The issue was settled through the mediation of Ii Naotaka of Hikone Domain.

In any event, Munezumi maintained close relations with Sendai Domain and his northern relations, and after the Date Sōdō, he offered refuge to Munekatsu's daughter-in-law and her children. During his tenure, Munezumi fell ill and was attended to by a wandering physician from Tosa Domain named Yamada Chūzaemon. He was well-versed in literary and military arts and was awarded a fief of 100 koku and persuaded to stay in Yoshida as Munezumi's advisor. Yamada persuaded Munezumi that he should reduce the domain's expenditures by demoting senior retainers who had held their posts for multi-generations and who were receiving high levels of compensation. This understandably made many retainers upset, leading to an armed uprising known as the "Yamada Disturbance"and an appeal directly to Sendai Domain. Ultimately, Yamada was expelled to Sendai, and Uwajima was asked to mediate a resolution to the conflict. This event enforced the position of Iyo-Yamada as a subsidiary domain to Uwajima.

In 1701, the 3rd daimyō, Date Munetoyo was one of two daimyō appointed to entertain imperial envoys to the Shogun's court in Edo. The other daimyō was Asano Naganori of Ako Domain. He was thus an eyewitness to the incident which led to the famed Akō vendetta. The domain suffered greatly from the Kyōhō famine of 1732–1733, and the domain imposed heavy taxes an monopolized on cash products, such as the production of paper. This led to a massive uprising. In November 1794, a han school was established.

The 7th daimyō of Iyo-Yoshida, was the son of the daimyō of Uwajima, Date Muranaga, and the 8th daimyō of Iyo-Yoshida, was the younger brother of the daimyō of Uwajima, Date Munenari. During the Bakumatsu period, Iyo-Yoshida was a supporter of the shogunate, but was restrained from any active participation in the Boshin War by Uwajima Domain, and thus escaped punishment by the new Meiji government. After the abolition of the han system in July 1871, Iyo-Yoshida Domain became "Yoshida Prefecture" which was merged with "Uwajima Prefecture" "Ozu Prefecture" and "Niiya Prefecture" to form the new "Uwajima Prefecture, which later became part of Ehime Prefecture.

== Holdings at the end of the Edo period ==
As with most domains in the han system, Iyo-Yoshida Domain consisted of several discontinuous territories calculated to provide the assigned kokudaka, based on periodic cadastral surveys and projected agricultural yields. At the end of the 16th century, the Chōsokabe family's kokudaka of Tosa Province was only 98,000 koku per the Taiko land survey. The Yamauchi clan had an official kokudaka of 202,600 koku, but when the rival Tokushima Domain gained Awaji Province in 1615 and raised its kokudaka from 170,000 to 257,000 koku, Tosa Domain also demanded that its kokudaka be reassess as 257,000 koku, so that it would not lose prestige and be considered inferior to Tokushima. The shogunate refused the demand and Tosa Domain remained at 202,600 koku. However, this was an official, nominal, value, and the actual kokudaka of the domain is estimated to have been at least 494,000 koku.

- Iyo Province
  - 87 villages in Uwa District

== List of daimyō ==
| # | Name | Tenure | Courtesy title | Court Rank | kokudaka |
|---|---|---|---|---|---|
Date clan, 1657–1871 (Tozama)
| 1 | Date Munezumi (伊達宗純) | 1657–1691 | Kunai-shoyu (宮内少輔) | Junior 5th Rank, Lower Grade (従五位下) | 30,000 koku |
| 2 | Date Muneyasu (伊達宗保) | 1691–1693 | Noto-no-kami (能登守)) | Junior 5th Rank, Lower Grade (従五位下) | 30,000 koku |
| 3 | Date Muratoyo (伊達村豊) | 1693–1737 | Sakyo-no-suke (左京亮) | Junior 5th Rank, Lower Grade (従五位下) | 30,000 koku |
| 4 | Date Muranobu (伊達村信) | 1737–1763 | Kii-no-kami (紀伊守) | Junior 5th Rank, Lower Grade (従五位下) | 30,000 koku |
| 5 | Date Murayasu (伊達村賢) | 1763–1790 | Izumi-no-kami (和泉守) | Junior 5th Rank, Lower Grade (従五位下) | 30,000 koku |
| 6 | Date Murayoshi (伊達村芳) | 1790–1816 | Wakasa-no-kami (若狭守) | Junior 5th Rank, Lower Grade (従五位下) | 30,000 koku |
| 7 | Date Munemoto (伊達宗翰) | 1816–1845 | Izumi-no-kami (和泉守) | Junior 5th Rank, Lower Grade (従五位下) | 30,000 koku |
| 8 | Date Munemichi (伊達宗孝) | 1843–1868 | Wakasa-no-kami (若狭守) | Junior 5th Rank, Lower Grade (従五位下) | 30,000 koku |
| 9 | Date Munetaka (伊達宗敬) | 1868–1871 | Wakasa-no-kami (若狭守) | Junior 5th Rank, Lower Grade (従五位下) | 30,000 koku |

== See also ==
- List of Han
- Abolition of the han system
