= Ichinoseki Domain =

Ichinoseki Domain 一関藩
- under Tokugawa shogunate Japan
- 1660–1671; 1681–1871
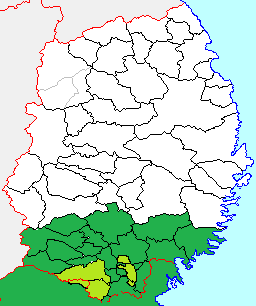
- Map of Ichinoseki Domain in the late Edo period in light green, Sendai Domain holdings in dark green
- Capital: Ichinoseki jin'ya
- Area
  - Coordinates: 40°30′53.1″N 141°29′16.3″E
  - Type: Daimyō
- Historical era: Edo period
  - Established: 1660
  - Annexed by Sendai Domain: 1671
  - Split from Sendai Domain: 1681
  - Abolished: 1871
- Today part of: part of Iwate Prefecture

Ichinoseki Domain (一関藩, Ichinoseki-han) was a tozama feudal domain of Edo period Japan It was located in Mutsu Province, in northern Honshū. The domain was centered at Ichinoseki jin'ya, located in the center of what is now the city of Ichinoseki in Iwate Prefecture.

== History ==
=== Ichinoseki Domain (Date clan) ===
The first Ichinoseki Domain was created in 1660 for Date Munekatsu, the 10th son of Date Masamune, although a fortification had existed at Ichinoseki since the Muromachi period. It was a subsidiary domain to Sendai Domain. However, Date Munekatsu was a central figure in the Date Sōdō, an O-Ie Sōdō over the succession to the Date clan and was dispossessed in 1671, with his holdings reverting to Sendai Domain.

=== Iwanuma Domain ===
Iwanuma Domain was another 30,000 koku subsidiary domain of Sendai Domain, created in 1660 for Tamura Muneyoshi. It was located in what is now the city of Iwanuma, Miyagi. Muneyoshi was the third son of Date Tadamune. His grandmother Megohime was the only child of the last hereditary chieftain of the Tamura clan, and the clan was restored in accordance with her will. Tamura Muneyoshi was one of the guardians of Date Tsunamura, but was later forced to retire by the shogunate due to his role in the Date Sōdō succession dispute.

=== Ichinoseki Domain (Tamura clan) ===
In 1681, the second daimyō of Iwanuma, Tamura Tatsuaki relocated his seat to Ichinoseki. Tatsuaki was the great-grandson of Date Masamune, and was especially favoured by shōgun Tokugawa Tsunayoshi, and despite his tozama status enjoyed many of the privileges accorded to a fudai daimyō.

The Tamura clan continued to rule Ichinoseki until the Meiji restoration. However, their position was somewhat ambiguous. Although treated by the Tokugawa shogunate as completely independent, Ichinoseki never received a formal document from the shogunate authorizing its han status. On the other hand, Sendai Domain still regarded Ichinoseki has part of its own territory, and Ichinoseki was compelled to abide by Date clan house rules. This meant that Ichinoseki was not able to issue its own laws and regulations. The situation of Ichinoseki was further complicated by the fact that it was not a unitary territory, but consisted of two areas separated by the Kitakami River and several Date-held territories in between.

As commemorated in the story of the Chūshingura, Asano Naganori was invited to commit seppuku while being held under house arrest at the Tamura's Edo residence over the incident at the Matsu no Ōrōka in Edo Castle where he drew his sword against Kira Yoshinaka.

During the Bakumatsu period, an Ichinoseki doctor was influential in the establishment of a medical school in Sendai in 1822.

During the Boshin War, Tamura Kuniyoshi led the domain into the Ōuetsu Reppan Dōmei, but along with Sendai Domain, was forced to surrender to imperial forces a few months later. In July 1871, with the abolition of the han system, Ichinoseki Domain briefly became Ichinoseki Prefecture, and was merged into the newly created Iwate Prefecture. Under the new Meiji government, he and his son, Tamura Takaaki, the final daimyō of Ichinoseki Domain was given the kazoku peerage titles of shishaku (viscount).

== List of daimyōs ==
#	Name	Tenure	Courtesy title	Court Rank	kokudaka	Notes
Date clan (tozama) 1660–1671
1	Date Munekatsu (伊達宗勝)	1660–1671	Hyōbu-no-daisuke (兵部大輔)	Junior 5th Rank, Lower Grade (従五位下)	30,000 koku	
Tamura clan (tozama) 1681–1871
1	Tamura Tatsuaki (田村建顕)	1681–1708	Ukyō-no-daifu (右京大夫); Inaba-no-kami (因幡守)	Junior 5th Rank, Lower Grade (従五位下)	30,000 koku	
2	Tamura Nobuaki (田村建顕)	1708–1727	Shimōsa-no-kami (下総守)	Junior 5th Rank, Lower Grade (従五位下)	30,000 koku	
3	Tamura Muraaki (田村村顕)	1727–1755	Oki-no-kami (隠岐守); Sakyō-no-daifu (左京大夫)	Junior 5th Rank, Lower Grade (従五位下)	30,000 koku	
4	Tamura Murataka (田村村隆)	1755–1782	Shimōsa-no-kami (下総守); Sakyō-no-daifu (左京大夫)	Junior 5th Rank, Lower Grade (従五位下)	30,000 koku	
5	Tamura Murasuke (田村村資)	1782–1798	Sakyō-no-daifu (左京大夫)	Junior 5th Rank, Lower Grade (従五位下)	30,000 koku	
6	Tamura Muneaki (田村宗顕)	1798–1827	Sakyō-no-daifu (左京大夫); Ukyō-no-daifu (右京大夫)	Junior 5th Rank, Lower Grade (従五位下)	30,000 koku	
7	Tamura Kuniaki (田村邦顕)	1828–1840	Sakyō-no-daifu (左京大夫)	Junior 5th Rank, Lower Grade (従五位下)	30,000 koku	
8	Tamura Kuniyuki (田村邦行)	1840–1857	Ukyō-no-daifu (右京大夫)	Junior 5th Rank, Lower Grade (従五位下)	30,000 koku	
9	Tamura Yukiaki (田村通顕)	1857–1863	Mimasaka-no-kami (美作守); Jijū (侍従)	Junior 4th Rank Lower Grade (従四位下)	30,000 koku	
10	Tamura Kuniyoshi (田村邦栄)	1863–1868	Sakyō-no-daifu (左京大夫)	5th Rank, Lower Grade (五位下)	30,000 koku	
11	Tamura Takaaki (田村崇顕)	1868–1871	Ukyō-no-daifu (右京大夫)	Junior 5th Rank, Lower Grade (従五位下)	30,000 koku	

=== Tamura Tatsuaki ===
Tamura Tatsuaki (田村建顕; 30 June 1656 – 18 February 1708) was the second and final daimyō of Iwanuma Domain and first Tamura daimyō of Ichinoseki Domain. His courtesy title was Ukyō-no-daifu, later Inaba-no-kami, and his Court rank was Junior Fifth Rank, Lower Grade. Tatsuaki was the second son of Tamura Muneyoshi, the daimyō of the 30,000 koku Iwanuma Domain. He underwent the genpuku ceremony in 1660 and was received in formal audience by shōgun Tokugawa Ietsuna, who confirmed him as heir to Iwanuma. However, in May 1681, the seat of Iwanuma Domain was relocated to Ichinoseki. Tatsuaki was noted for his scholarship, and in 1691 was elevated to the status of provisional Fudai daimyō. In 1692, he was appointed a sōshaban. The same year, he changed his name from Tamura Munenaga (宗永) to Tamura Tatsuaki. In 1693, he received the additional honor of being styled as castellan, although his domain was only ranked that of a jin'ya. In 1694, his younger brother was elevated to the ranks of the hatamoto. He was married to the daughter of Matsudaira Chikayoshi, from Matsue Domain, but as he had no sons, he adopted the son of a hatamoto to be his heir. In 1701, in the aftermath of the famous Chūshingura incident, he was assigned custody of Asano Naganori, who later committed seppuku at the Ichinoseki Domain's residence in Edo. In 1705, he received the courtesy title of Inaba-no-kami. He died at age 53, and his grave is at the clan mortuary temple of Tōzen-ji in Takanawa, Edo.

=== Tamura Nobuaki ===
Tamura Nobuaki (田村誠顕; 21 March 1670 – 23 August 1727) was the 2nd Tamuradaimyō of Ichinoseki Domain. His courtesy title was Shimōsa-no-kami, and his Court rank was Junior Fifth Rank, Lower Grade. Nobuaki was the 5th son of Tamura Akiate, a hatamoto from a subsidiary line of the Tamura clan．As the daimyō of Ichinoseki, Tamaura Tatsuaki had no sons, he was adopted as heir in February 1696 and became daimyō on the death of Tatsuaki in 1708. He died in 1727 at the age of 58 after an uneventful tenure, and his grave is at the clan mortuary temple of Shoun-ji in Ichinoseki. He was succeeded by the son of Date Muneyoshi of Uwajima Domain, whom he had adopted as his son under the name of Tamura Muraaki.

=== Tamura Muraaki ===
Tamura Muraaki (田村村顕; 23 June 1707 – 8 September 1755) was the 3rd Tamura daimyō of Ichinoseki Domain. His courtesy title was Oki-no-kami (later Sakyō-no-daifu), and his Court rank was Junior Fifth Rank, Lower Grade. Muraaki was the 2nd son of Date Muneyoshi, daimyō of Uwajima Domain. In October, 1726 he was adopted as heir to Ichinoseki Domain by Tamura Nobuaki, and became daimyō on the latter's death the following year. He had an uneventful tenure, which is fortunate as contemporary records indicate that he spent most his time at falconry and hunting. At the time of his death at the age of 49 in 1755, he had only a young daughter, so the fifth son of Date Yoshimura, daimyō of Sendai Domain was posthumously adopted as his successor. His grave is at the clan mortuary temple of Tōzen-ji in Takanawa, Edo.

=== Tamura Murataka ===
Tamura Murataka (田村村隆; 21 June 1737 – 19 March 1782) was the 4th Tamura daimyō of Ichinoseki Domain. His courtesy title was Shimōsa-no-kami (later Sakyō-no-daifu), and his Court rank was Junior Fifth Rank, Lower Grade. Murataka was the 5th son of Date Yoshimura, daimyō of Sendai Domain and was born in Aoba Castle. In 1742, he was adopted by Date Muratomo, chieftain of the Tome-Date clan, a hatamoto branch of the main Date clan, taking the name Date Murayoshi (伊達村候), and subsequently Date Murakatsu (伊達村勝). In May 1752, he was adopted as heir to Ichinoseki Domain by Tamura Muraaki, and became daimyō on the latter's death in September 1755. In 1756, his young nephew Date Shigemura became daimyō of Sendai, and Murataka was appointed to act as guardian. His tenure was marked by repeated crop failures caused by cold summers and drought, which drove the domain to the edge of bankruptcy, and he had to turn to Sendai Domain for financial assistance on three occasions. On his death at the age of 46 in 1782, he was succeeded by his grandson, Tamura Murasuke. His grave is at the clan mortuary temple of Tōzen-ji in Takanawa, Edo.

=== Tamura Murasuke ===
Tamura Murasuke (田村村資; 15 February 1763 – 14 December 1808) was the 5th Tamura daimyō of Ichinoseki Domain. His courtesy title was Sakyō-no-daifu, and his Court rank was Junior Fifth Rank, Lower Grade. Murasuke was the eldest son of Date Murayoshi, chieftain of the Tome-Data clan, a hatamoto branch of the main Date clan. In 1778, he was adopted as heir by Tamura Murataka, and became daimyō on the latter's death in March 1782. The following year, he ordered the construction of a han school. In 1796, an O-ie-sodo erupted in Sendai Domain following the sudden death of Date Narimura and quick action on part of Tamura Murasuke in closing off the highways in the area prevented the violence from spilling over into Ichinoseki. In 1798, he retired from public office, and was succeeded by his adopted son, Tamura Muneaki. His grave is at the clan mortuary temple of Tōzen-ji in Takanawa, Edo.

=== Tamura Muneaki ===
Tamura Muneaki (田村宗顕; 19 June 1784 – 25 December 1827) was the 6th Tamura daimyō of Ichinoseki Domain. His courtesy title was Sakyō-no-daifu, later Ukyō-no-Daifu and his Court rank was Junior Fifth Rank, Lower Grade. Muneaki was the younger son of Nakamura Murayoshi, a hatamoto serving Sendai Domain and son of Date Munemura who had been adopted as heir by Hotta Masatomi of Katata Domain in Omi Province. In 1793, Muneaki returned to Ishinoseki as heir to Tamura Murasuke, who effectively retired in 1798. At this time, he was called Tamura Takaaki (田村敬顕). He married Murasuke's daughter in 1802 and took the name of Muneaki in 1808. The domain continued to suffer from repeated crop failures, and the domain finances were further complicated by orders from the shogunate to contribute to the defenses of the frontier of Ezo. His grave is at the clan mortuary temple of Shoun-ji in Ichinoseki.

=== Tamura Kuniaki ===
Tamura Kuniaki (田村邦顕; 12 February 1817 – 18 September 1840) was the 7th daimyō of Ichinoseki Domain. His courtesy title was Sakyō-no-daifu, and his Court rank was Junior Fifth Rank, Lower Grade. Kuniaki was the younger son of Tamura Muneaki and was born at the clan's nakayashiki in Edo. He became daimyō on the death of his father in 1827, and was received in formal audience by shōgun Tokugawa Ienari in 1828. He underwent the genpuku ceremony at the Sendai Domain's hamayashiki in 1829, with Date Narikuni as master of ceremonies, and received the kanji of kuni in his name at that time. The domain continued to suffer from repeated crop failures, and financial problems during his tenure. On his death at the age of 25, he was childless, and his younger brother was posthumously adopted to maintain the family line. His grave is at the clan mortuary temple of Tōzen-ji in Takanawa, Edo.

=== Tamura Kuniyuki ===
Tamura Kuniyuki (田村邦行; 31 August 1820 – 14 March 1857) was the 8th Tamura daimyō of Ichinoseki Domain. His courtesy title was Sakyō-no-daifu, and his Court rank was Junior Fifth Rank, Lower Grade. Kuniyuki was the fourth son of Tamura Muneaki and was initially named Akichika (顕允). He was posthumously adopted by his brother, Tamura Kuniaki on the latter's death in 1840, becoming daimyō. He changed his name to Tamura Kuniaki (行顕) at that time. In 1841, he changed his name again, this time to Kuniyuki. The same year, he married the daughter of the daimyō of Inuyama Domain, Naruse Masanaga. During his tenure, he reformed the domain's finances, undertook land reform, and rebuilt the domain academy, emphasizing medical science. He also took steps to modernize the domain's military by introducing more modern firearms. Regarded as an able ruler, he died at the age of 38 and his grave is at the clan temple of Tōzen-ji, in Tamanawa, Tokyo.

=== Tamura Yukiaki ===
Tamura Yukiaki (田村邦行; 16 July 1850 – 17 July 1867) was the 9th Tamura daimyō of Ichinoseki Domain. His courtesy title was Mimasaka-no-kami and Jijū, and his Court rank was Junior Fourth Rank, Lower Grade. Yukiaki was the eldest son of Tamura Kuniyuki and became daimyō in 1857 on the latter's death. However, in 1863 he was adopted by Date Yoshikuni to become heir to Sendai Domain and changed his name to Date Mochimura. This left Ichinoseki without a ruler. Initially, Date Kunishige from a junior branch of the Date clan was proposed, but this was strongly opposed by the domain leadership, and Tamura Kuniyoshi, the son of a Date clan hatamoto Ishikawa Yoshimitsu was selected instead. However, Yukiaki died at the age of 18 at the Date clan's Edo residence, and thus did not become daimyō of Sendai. His grave is at the Date clan temple of Dainen-ji, in Sendai.

=== Tamura Kuniyoshi ===
Tamura Kuniyoshi (田村邦栄) (July 7, 1852 – February 26, 1887) was the 10th Tamura daimyō of Ichinoseki Domain. His courtesy title was Sakyō-no-daifu, and his Court rank was Junior Fifth Rank, Lower Grade. Kuniyoshi was the 7th son of Ishikawa Yoshimitsu, the 13th hereditary chieftain of the Ishikawa clan, a cadet branch of the Date clan of Sendai Domain. In 1863, Tamura Yukiaki, the 9th daimyō of Ichinoseki Domain was adopted by Date Yoshikuni as heir apparent to Sendai Domain, which left Ichinoseki Domain leaderless. Kuniyoshi was appointed by clan elders to become daimyō and became the adopted son of Yukiaki through marriage to Yukiaki's daughter. He initially took the name of Tamura Yoshiaki (田村栄顕), but later changed to Tamura Kuniyoshi. In 1868, he obeyed the call of Sendai Domain, and led Ichinoseki troops into the Ōuetsu Reppan Dōmei against the new Meiji government in the Boshin War. However, only a few months later, he retired in favor of his younger brother, Tamura Takaaki. His grave is at the Aoyama Cemetery in Tokyo.

=== Tamura Takaaki ===
Tamura Takaaki (田村崇顕; 24 December 1858 – 11 December 1922) was the 11th and final Tamura daimyō of Ichinoseki Domain. His courtesy title was Mimasaka-no-kami and Ukyō-no-daifu (右京大夫), and his Court rank was Junior Fourth Rank, Lower Grade. Takaaki was the ninth son of Ishikawa Yoshimitsu, a hatamoto from a cadet line of the Date clan of Sendai Domain. In 1868, his step-brother Tamura Kuniyoshi was forced to abdicate due to his role in leading the domain against the new Meiji government in the Boshin War, and the clan elders were forced to quickly select a successor. Takaaki became daimyō at the age of 10; however, the following year the title was abolished, and he became domain governor. He returned the post of clan chieftain to Kuniyoshi in 1882. In 1887, when Kuniyoshi died, he resumed the title, and well as the kazoku peerage title of shishaku (viscount). On his death at the age of 65 in 1922, the titles passed to Kuniyoshi's son, Tamura Hiroaki (1875–1945), a career naval officer in the Imperial Japanese Navy. and graduate of the United States Naval Academy at Annapolis. His grave is at the Aoyama Cemetery in Tokyo.

== Bakumatsu period holdings ==
As with most domains in the han system, Ichinoseki Domain consisted of several discontinuous territories calculated to provide the assigned kokudaka, based on periodic cadastral surveys and projected agricultural yields.

- Mutsu Province
  - 35 villages in Iwai District
  - 2 villages in Kurihaha District

== See also ==
- List of Han
- Tamura clan
- Date clan
