= Date Tsunamune =

- 伊達綱宗
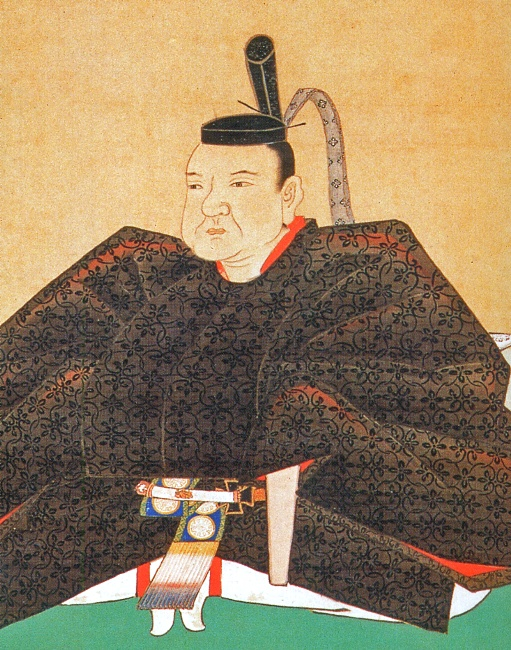
- Portrait of Date Tsunamune at Sendai City Museum

3rd Daimyō of Sendai Domain
- In office 1658–1660
- Monarch: Shōgun: Tokugawa Ietsuna
- Preceded by: Date Tadamune
- Succeeded by: Date Tsunamura

Personal details
- Born: September 23, 1640
- Died: July 19, 1711 (aged 70) Edo, Japan
- Resting place: Zuihōden, Sendai, Miyagi, Japan
- Spouse: < no official wife >
- Domestic partner: Misawa Hatsuko
- Parents: Date Tadamune (father); Kai-hime (mother)

Date Tsunamune (伊達 綱宗; DAH-tay; 23 September 1640 – 19 July 1711) was an early Edo period Japanese samurai, and the third daimyō of Sendai Domain in northern Japan from 1658 to 1660, and the 19th hereditary chieftain of the Date clan. Tsunamune's succession and rule was soon opposed by a number of his kinsmen and vassals. This dispute eventually led to the Date Sōdō or "Date Disturbance" of 1671, which has been retold in theatre, and has become one of the more well-known tales of unrest and disunity among the daimyō of the Edo period.

== Biography ==
Tsunamune was the sixth son of Date Tadamune by a concubine (Kai-hime, the maternal aunt of Emperor Go-Sai, which thus made him cousin with the Emperor). His courtesy title was Sakonoe-gon-shōshō (General of the Left Guards), and his Court rank was Junior Fourth Rank, Lower Grade. On the death of his father, he became daimyō and Mutsu-no-kami at the age of 18.

Due to his inexperience and his love of sake and women, rumours soon spread that he was unfit to govern. The center of opposition was his uncle, Date Munekatsu, daimyō of Ichinoseki Domain (and Date Masamune's 10th son), who suborned many of Tsunamune's retainers. In 1660, this clique of vassals and kinsman made a successful appeal to the rōjū to have Tsunemune removed from office and placed under house arrest in Edo under the charges of public drunkenness and debauchery while he was visiting the capital on sankin-kōtai and to supervise corvée labor on a canal. He was replaced in Sendai by his infant son, Date Tsunamura, then only age one. The actual government of Sendai Domain was turned over to Date Munekatsu and to another uncle, Tamura Muneyoshi, as guardians.

This event was the start of the Date Sōdō, which became a favorite theme of popular fiction, including bunraku and kabuki.

According to one of the most popular legends, the scheming Date Munekatsu took the impressionable young Tsunamune to the licensed quarters of Yoshiwara, where he passionately fell in love with a prostitute, Takao. However, Takao was already pledged to marry a rōnin when her time at the brothel had expired and she rejected Tsunamune's offers. Undeterred, he offered to buy her contract in gold equal to her weight. The unscrupulous brothel-keeper added weights to her sleeves, so that he had to pay more than 165 pounds of gold. However, when he came to take her to the Date residence, she tried to throw herself in the river rather than go with him. Furious, Tsunamura pulled her from the river by her hair and stabbed her in the heart. His uncle and the other conspirators seized this opportunity to denounce him to the officials of wanton behavior and force his retirement. This story was the basis of many bunraku and kabuki plays, and attracted an extraordinary number of researchers over the years who have tried to determine if there was any truth in the story. It appears that Tsunamura did visit Yoshiwara and was enamoured by the prostitute named Takao, but she died in 1659 of illness and not by his hand.

While Tsunamune remained under house arrest, the domain suffered greatly under the corrupt rule of Date Munekatsu and Tamura Muneyoshi. After ten years of violence and conflict, Aki Muneshige, a relative from a cadet branch of the Date clan and retainer of Tsunamune managed to register a complaint to the shogunate officials about the mismanagement of the domain. Aki and various domain officials were summoned before the council of rōjū and the Tairō Sakai Tadakiyo to testify. Testimony between Aki and the retainers of Munekatsu and Muneyoshi did not agree, and the testimony of Munekatsu's retainer Harada Munesuke made a particularly poor impression. Harada then murdered Aki before further testimony could be given, before being killed himself by the guards.

The court ruled in favor of Aki. The young Date Tsunamura was allowed to remain daimyō; however, his uncles Date Munekatsu and Tamura Muneyoshi were removed from office.

As for Tsunamune, he lived the next 50 years in loose house arrest at the clan residence in the Ōi area of Edo, devoting his time to the arts, studying painting under Kanō Tan'yū, calligraphy, waka poetry, Maki-e lacquerware and even learning to forge Japanese swords. A number of his works are on display at The Miyagi Museum of Art. He died in Edo in 1711, but his grave was at the Date clan mausoleum of Zuihōden in Sendai. His mortuary temple was destroyed in 1945 during the Bombing of Sendai during World War II, and reconstructed in 1981. His body was so well preserved that an autopsy could be performed, revealing that he had a height of 158 cm and blood type A+, and had died of oral cancer.

== Family ==
- Father: Date Tadamune
- Mother: Kii-hime (1624–1642)
- Concubine: Misawa Hatsuko (1640–1686)
  - 1st son: Date Tsunamura, daimyō of Sendai Domain
  - 2nd son: Date Murayori (1661–1772), adopted by hatamoto Mizusawa-Date clan, later daimyō of Nakatsuyama sub-domain
  - 3rd son: Date Muneyun (1665–1771) adopted by Date Munetoshi, later daimyō of Uwajima Domain
- Concubine: Seiun'in
  - 1st daughter: Natsuko / Kiyoko, married hatamoto Date Harusane of the Watari-Date clan, remarried to Date Harusada of the Iwaya-Date clan
  - 4th son: Date Muranao (1666–1709), adopted by hatamoto Date Munetomo of the cadet Tome-Date clan
  - 3rd daughter: Sanhime married Nakamura Moriyoshi
- Concubine: Ohari no Kata
  - 2nd daughter: Ruihime, married hatamoto Date Muramoto of the Watari-Date clan
  - 4th daughter: Senhime, died in infancy
  - 5th daughter: Chiehime, married Tachibana Sadaakira
- Concubine: Yosei'in
  - 6th daughter: Kirahime, adopted by Date Tsunamura, married Honda Yasunobu, daimyō of Zeze Domain
  - 7th daughter: Narehime, died in infancy
  - 5th son: Date Kikunosuke, died in infancy
  - 8th daughter, Musuhime, died in infancy
- Concubine: Bo-dono
  - 6th son: Date Kichijuro, died in infancy
- Concubine: Otome no Kata
  - 9th daughter: Yuhime, died in infancy
- Concubine: Kayo no Kata
  - Onohime, died in infancy

== See also ==
- Date Sōdō
