= Date Munekatsu =

- 伊達宗勝
- Born: 1621
- Died: December 6, 1679 (aged 57–58); Edo, Japan
- Burial place: Gyōkō-ji, Kōchi, Japan
- Partner: daughter of Tachibana Takatsugu
- Children: Date Muneoki
- Parents: Date Masamune (father); Okachi-no-kata (mother)

Daimyō of Ichinoseki Domain
- In office 1660–1671

Date Munekatsu (伊達宗勝; DAH-tay; 1621 – December 6, 1679) was a Japanese daimyō of Ichinoseki Domain in early-Edo period Japan. His courtesy title was Hyōbu-no-daisuke, and his Court rank was Junior Fourth Rank, Lower Grade.

Munekatsu was the 10th son of Date Masamune. He appears in history in 1658, following the death of Date Tadamune, the second daimyō of Sendai Domain. Sendai Domain was inherited by the young and impressionable Date Tsunamune, and the clan elders appointed Munekatsu and his half-brother, Tamura Muneyoshi as guardians. Munekatsu’s daughter-in-law was the daughter of Tairō Sakai Tadakiyo. Through these connections, the Munekatsu and Tamura Muneyoshi accused Tsunamune of drunkenness and debauchery, who then removed from office for misrule and was confined to a secondary clan residence in Edo.

The infant Date Tsunamura was made daimyō of Sendai under the guardianship of his uncles, and Date Munekatsu was also granted a fief of 30,000 koku in Ichinoseki as a subsidiary feudal han to Sendai Domain. Ten years of violence and conflict followed in Sendai Domain, reaching a climax in 1671 when Aki Muneshige, a powerful relative of the Date clan, complained to the shogunate of the mismanagement of the fief under Tsunamura and his uncles. In the ensuring Date Sōdō, Munekatsu was relieved of his offices in 1671 and the branch of his family was dissolved. Munekatsu was exiled to Tosa Domain and his son Date Muneoki to Kokura Domain, daughter-in-law to a subsidiary of Uwajima Domain, and his two concubines and their four children to a junior branch of the Date clan in Iwadeyama. Munekatsu died in Tosa in 1679 at the age of 59. His grave is at the temple of Gyōkō-ji in the city of Kōchi.
