= Tamura Kuniyoshi =

- 田村邦栄
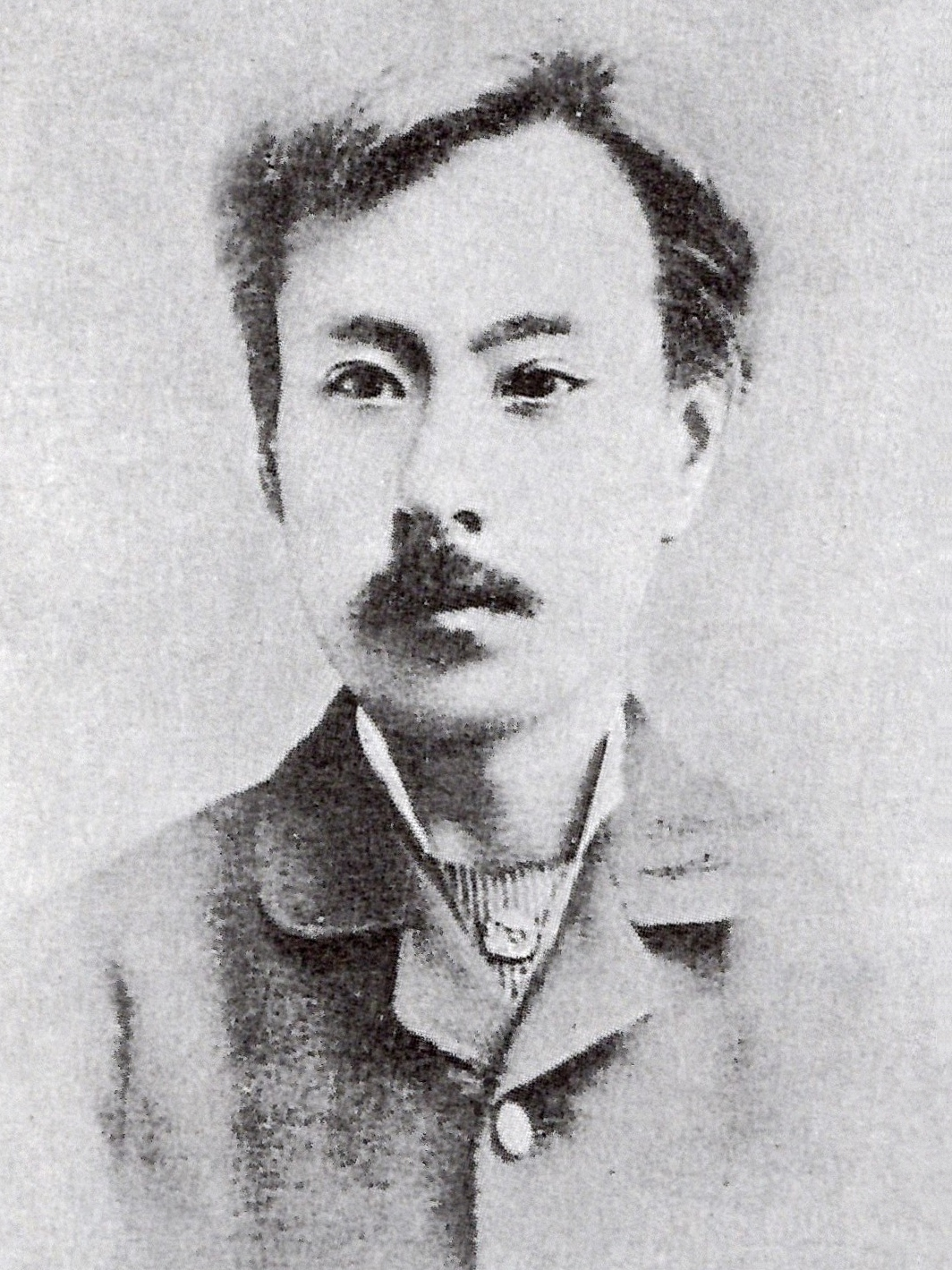
- Tamura Kuniyoshi, post-Meiji restoration
- Born: July 7, 1852
- Died: February 26, 1887 (aged 34)
- Burial place: Aoyama Cemetery, Tokyo, Japan
- Other names: Tamura Yoshiaki

Daimyō of Ichinoseki Domain#Iwanuma Domain
- In office 1863–1868
- Spouse: Teru (daughter of Tamura Yukiaki)
- Father: Ishikawa Yoshimitsu

Viscount Tamura Kuniyoshi (田村邦栄) (July 7, 1852 – February 26, 1887) was the 10th Tamura daimyō of Ichinoseki Domain. His courtesy title was Sakyō-no-daifu, and his Court rank was Junior Fifth Rank, Lower Grade. Kuniyoshi was the 7th son of Ishikawa Yoshimitsu, the 13th hereditary chieftain of the Ishikawa clan, a cadet branch of the Date clan of Sendai Domain. In 1863, Tamura Yukiaki, the 9th daimyō of Ichinoseki Domain was adopted by Date Yoshikuni as heir apparent to Sendai Domain, which left Ichinoseki Domain leaderless. Kuniyoshi was appointed by clan elders to become daimyō and became the adopted son of Yukiaki through marriage to Yukiaki's daughter. He initially took the name of Tamura Yoshiaki (田村栄顕), but later changed to Tamura Kuniyoshi. In 1868, he obeyed the call of Sendai Domain, and led Ichinoseki troops into the Ōuetsu Reppan Dōmei against the new Meiji government in the Boshin War. However, only a few months later, Ichinoseki along with Sendai Domain, was forced to surrender to imperial forces. Kuniyoshi retired in favor of his younger brother, Tamura Takaaki.

In 1869 his court rank was increased to Fifth Grade, and he served the new government in various capacities. In 1882, the chieftainship of the Tamura clan was returned from his brother, and in 1884 he was ennobled with the kazoku peerage title of shishaku (viscount). He died in 1887 at the age of 36, and his titles (including clan chieftainship) reverted to Tamura Takaaki; however, Takaaki appointed Kuniyoshi's son as his own heir.

His grave is at the Aoyama Cemetery in Tokyo.
