= Zuihōden =

Mausoleum complex in Sendai, Miyagi, Japan

Zuihōden (瑞鳳殿)
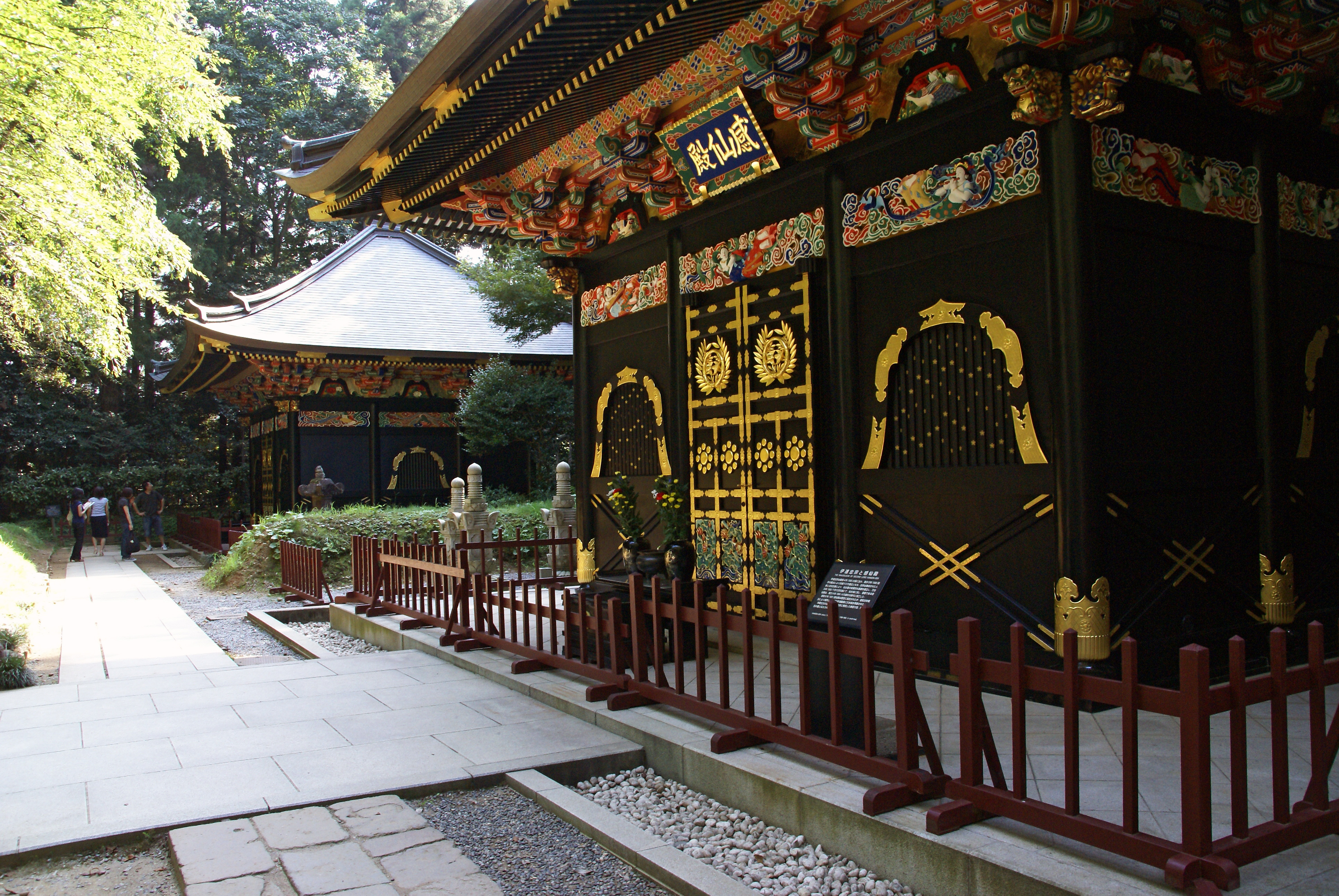
- Zuihōden, mausoleum of the Date clan in Sendai

- Location within Miyagi Prefecture Location within Japan

Religion
- Affiliation: Shinto
- Deity: Date Masamune

Location
- Interactive map of Zuihōden (瑞鳳殿)
- Coordinates: 38°15′2.9″N 140°51′56.5″E

Zuihōden (瑞鳳殿) in Sendai, Miyagi Prefecture, Japan is the mausoleum complex of Date Masamune and his heirs, daimyō of the Sendai Domain.

== History ==
When Date Masamune, known as 'the one-eyed dragon' (独眼竜) and founder of the Sendai Domain, died in 1636, he left instructions for a mausoleum. Zuihōden was erected in the following year. A number of the Date daimyō and other members of the Date clan are buried in the grounds. Most of the monuments were destroyed by bombing and subsequent fires in 1945 and subsequently rebuilt in their original Momoyama style.

== Monuments ==
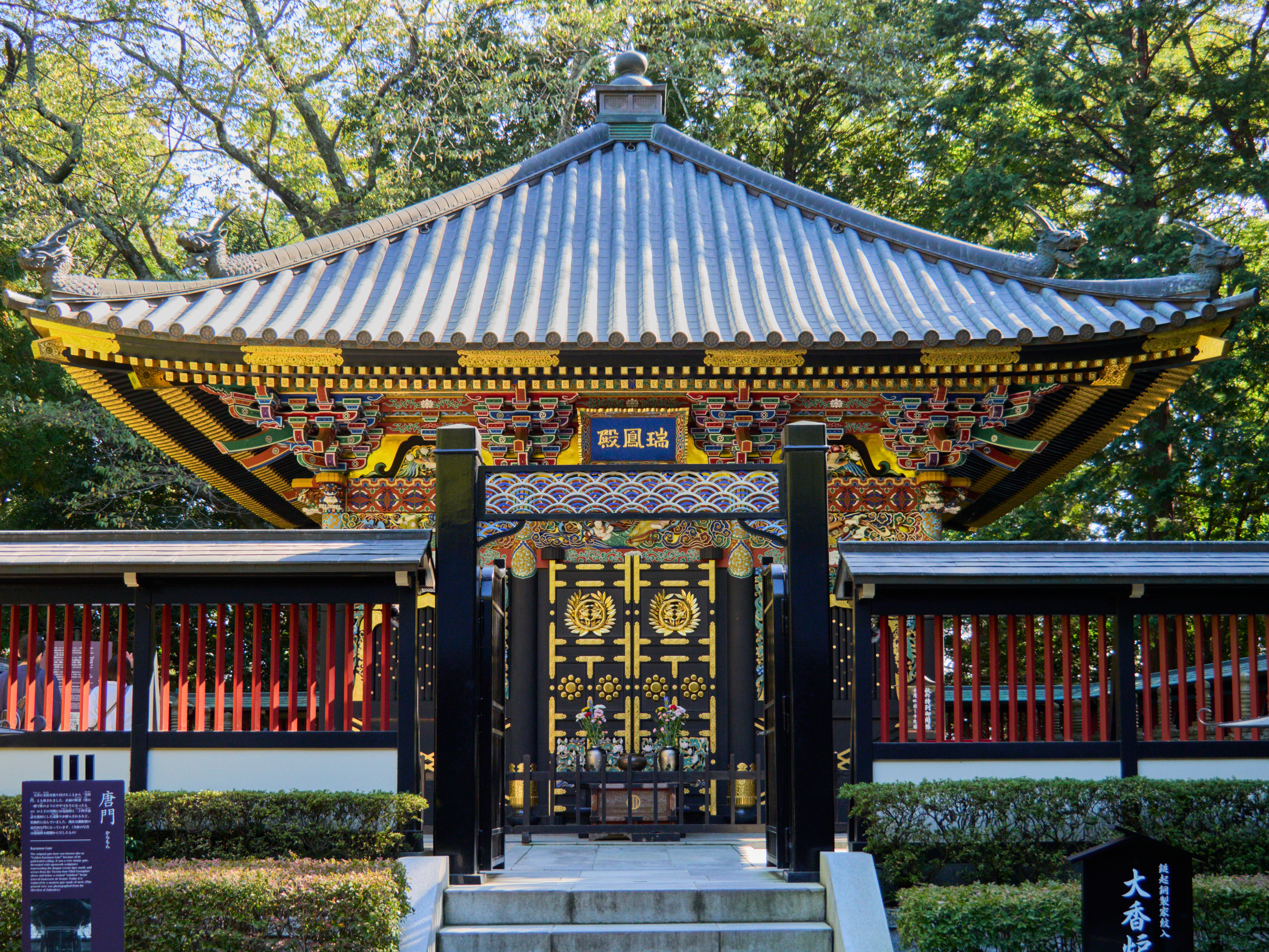

=== Zuihōden ===
The Zuihōden (瑞鳳殿) was built for Date Masamune (1567–1636), founding daimyō of the Sendai Domain. Designated a National Treasure (国宝) in 1931, it was destroyed in 1945, rebuilt in 1979, and repaired in 2001 in order to more closely resemble the original mausoleum.

=== Kansenden ===
The Kansenden (感仙殿) was built for Date Tadamune (1599–1658), second daimyō of the Sendai Domain. Designated a National Treasure in 1931, it was destroyed in 1945 and rebuilt in 1985.

=== Zennōden ===
The Zennōden (善応殿) was built for Date Tsunamune (1640–1711), third daimyō of the Sendai Domain. Destroyed in 1945, it was rebuilt in 1985 and repaired in 2007.

=== Myōnkaibyō ===
The Myōnkaibyō (妙雲界廟) is the site of stelai erected for Date Chikamune, ninth daimyō, and Date Nariyoshi, eleventh daimyō of the Sendai Domain.

=== Okosamagobyō ===
A number of children of the Date lords are buried in the Okosamagobyō (御子様御廟).

== Museum ==
Items found in excavations of the Kansenden and Zennōden prior to their reconstruction after the bombing of 1945 are housed in the Zuihōden Museum (資料館).

== See also ==
- Date clan
- Sendai Domain
- Entsū-in
- Tōshō-gū
