= Rutherford Alcock =

British diplomatic representative

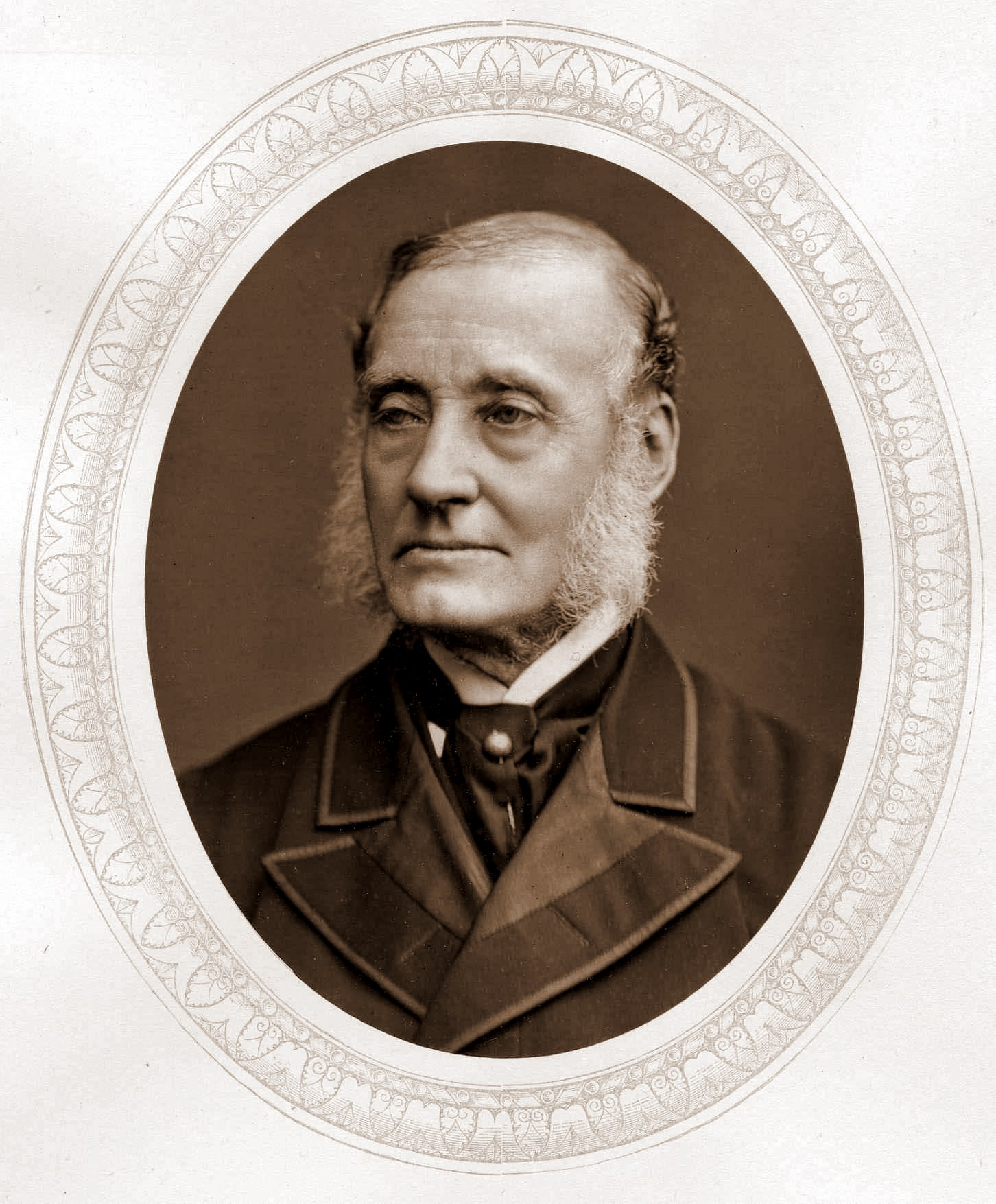
Sir Rutherford Alcock

Sir John Rutherford Alcock, KCB (25 May 1809 – 2 November 1897) was the first British diplomatic representative to live in Japan.

== Early life ==
Alcock was born in St James's, Middlesex, the son of the physician, Dr. Thomas Alcock, who practised at Ealing, near London, and his wife, Mary. As he grew up, Alcock followed his father into the medical profession. In 1836, he became a surgeon in the marine brigade which took part in the Carlist War in Spain, gaining distinction through his services. Alcock was made deputy inspector-general of hospitals. He retired from this service in 1837.

== Service in China ==
In 1844, he was appointed consul at Fuzhou in China, where, after a short official stay at Amoy, he performed the functions, as he expressed it, "of everything from a lord chancellor to a sheriff's officer." Fuchow was one of the ports opened to trade by the Treaty of Nanking, and Alcock had to perform an entirely new role with regard to the Chinese authorities. He served there for 18 months, arriving in March 1845 (his wife followed shortly after, when appropriate accommodation was found, and his sister in law Emma S. Bacon, and mother in law, Mrs. Bacon, arrived one year later). He was able to work on restoring peace and order and in doing so, he earned a promotion to the consulate at Shanghai.

Alcock, along with his wife, Henrietta, sister-in-law, and mother-in-law, moved to Shanghai in the fall of 1846, where they were part of a burgeoning community of expats, merchants and missionaries from England, France, and North America. Alcock made it a special part of his duties to superintend the established Chinese government and lay out the British settlement, which had developed into such an important feature of British commercial life in China. This included initially hosting a small church in his home, which his sister in law described as "...an immense rambling Chinese House containing fifty two Rooms / surrounded by courtyards, and divided by Galleries and Passages in all directions". In April 1847 it was, however, decided to apply to the Church Missionary Society for a Clergyman and to plan and build a church on land donated by a merchant, and it appears that Rutherford was heavily involved in this initiative.

Emma S. Bacon, Alcock's sister-in-law, wrote in April 1847, that the consulate was about two miles from Alcock's house and was to be built on ground "...by the River Side appropriated to the English...but as it is not yet commenced, it is uncertain when we shall inhabit it + but on the site appropriated for the Building Rutherford has at present Offices and a pretty sitting Room for our use, opening into a garden very nicely arranged...".

In 1853 Alcock's wife, Henrietta died (March), and the Taiping Rebellion reached Shanghai. The city was besieged and attacked until February 1855 when the rebels were starved and burned out of the city. Alcock remained in Shanghai until April of that year to restore peace and order, and then moved on to the Consulate in Canton, the original seat of much unrest in the 1840s. He was stationed in Canton for 1 year and then took a furlough to return home to England in October 1856, just before tensions once again ignited in Canton.

== Service in Japan (1858–64) ==
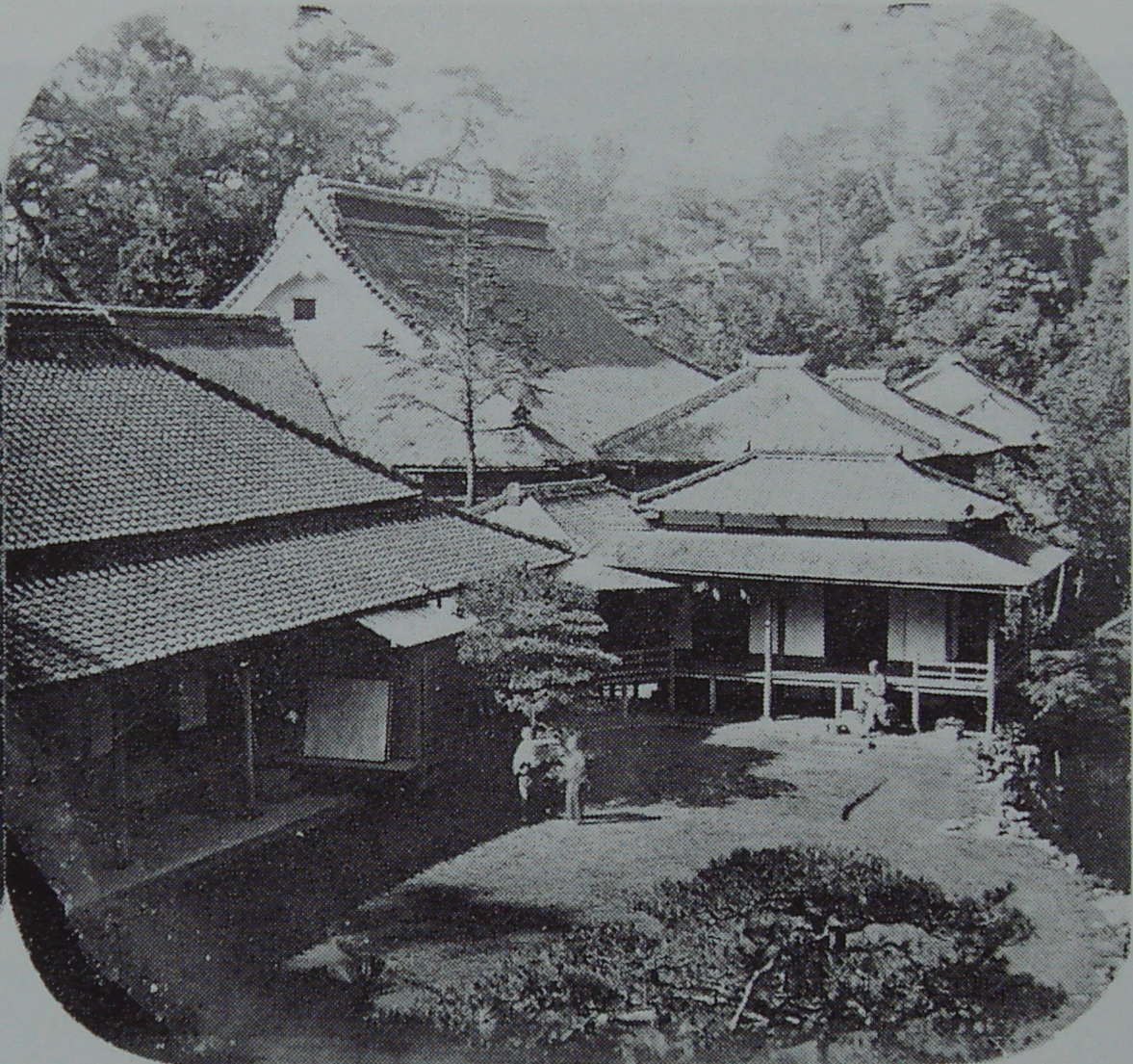
Rutherford Alcock located the British legation in Tokyo from 1859 in Tōzen-ji.

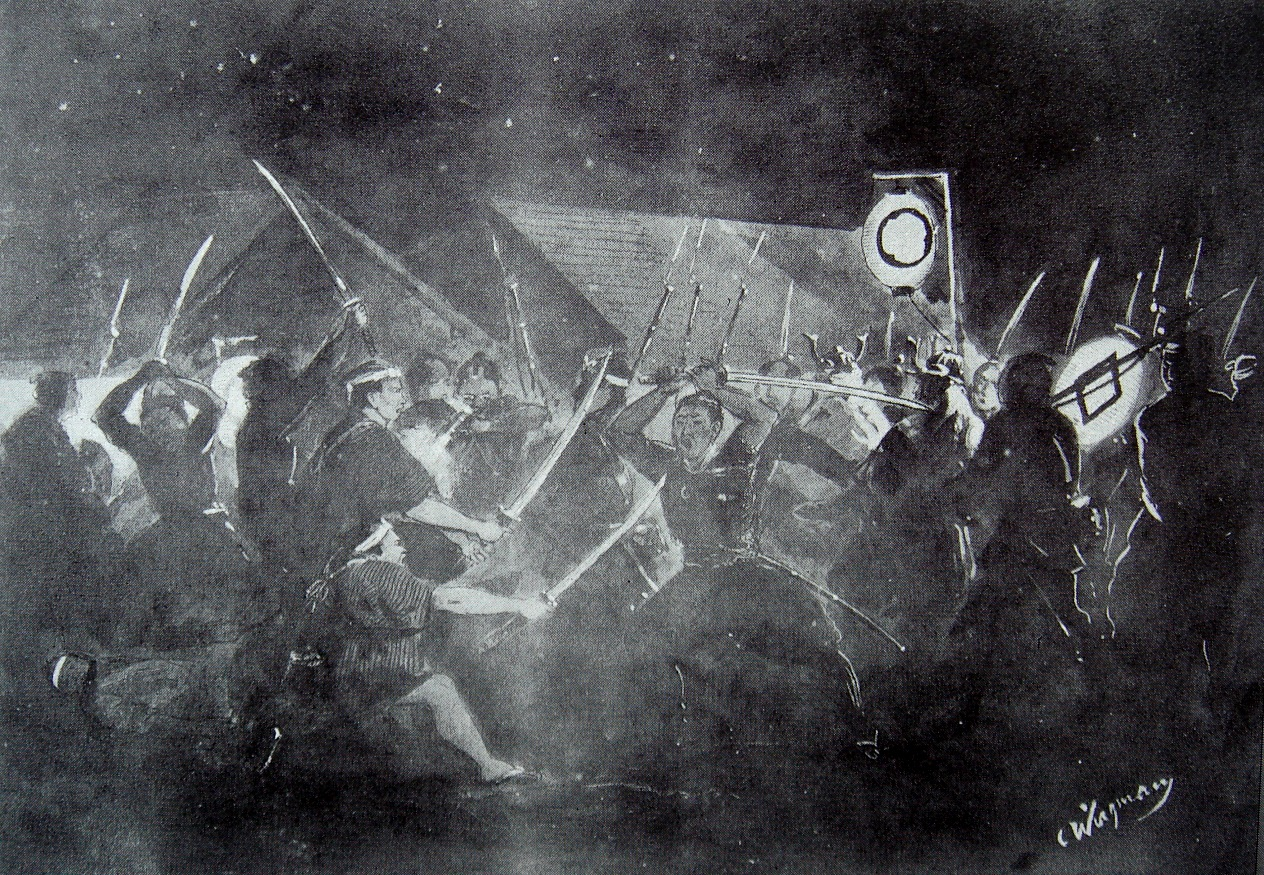
Attack on the British legation in Tōzen-ji on 5 July 1861.

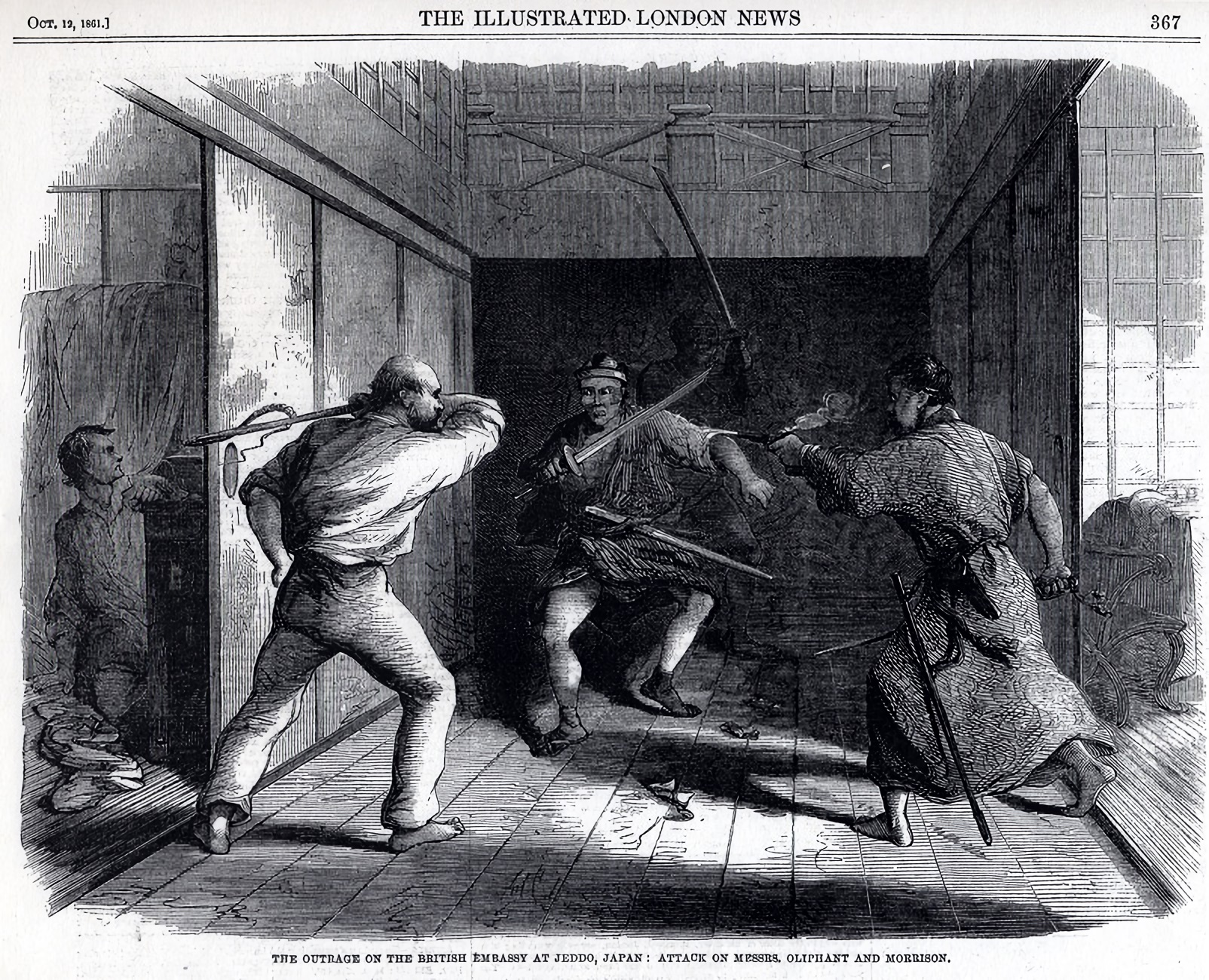
Attack of the British legation in Tōzen-ji, Edo, in 1861.

In 1858, he was appointed Consul-General and Minister Plenipotentiary in Japan, and remained in that position until 1865. Alcock played an important political role in Japan in the 1850s and 1860s, alongside fellow Western diplomats Dirk de Graeff van Polsbroek, Townsend Harris, Max von Brandt and Gustave Duchesne, Prince de Bellecourt. Although these men were bound by personal friendship, national rivalries and differences in dealing with the Japanese led to conflict and antagonism. However, the chaotic and ungovernable circumstances of the first few years forced them to cooperate.

Alcock opened the second British legation in Japan within the grounds of Tōzen-ji in Takanawa, Edo (now Tokyo), the first being at Hiogo (Kobe), under Sir Harry Parkes and the vice-consul Frank Gerard Myberg (also known as Francis Gerard Mijburg and Frans Gerard Mijberg, died 18 January 1868 buried at Kobe). He saw

"peace, plenty, apparent content, and a country more perfectly cultivated and kept, with more ornamental timber everywhere, than can be matched even in England", Sir Rutherford Alcock, 1860.

In those days, foreign residents in Japan faced some danger, with noticeable Japanese hostility to foreigners (sonnō jōi). In 1860, Alcock's native interpreter was murdered at the gate of the legation, and in the following year the legation was stormed by a group of ronin from the fiefdom of Mito-han, whose attack was repulsed by Alcock and his staff.

In September 1860 he became the first non-Japanese to climb Mount Fuji.

From March 1862 to March 1864, Alcock was on leave in England.

== Service in China (1865–69) ==
Shortly after these events he returned to England on leave in March 1862, and was replaced in Japan by Colonel Neale. Alcock had already been made a Companion of the Bath (CB) (1860). In 1862 he was made a Knight Commander of the same order (KCB), and in 1863 received an honorary Doctorate of Laws from Oxford University.

In 1864, he returned to Japan, and after a year's further residence he was transferred to Peking, where he represented the British government until 1869, when he retired.

== Later years ==
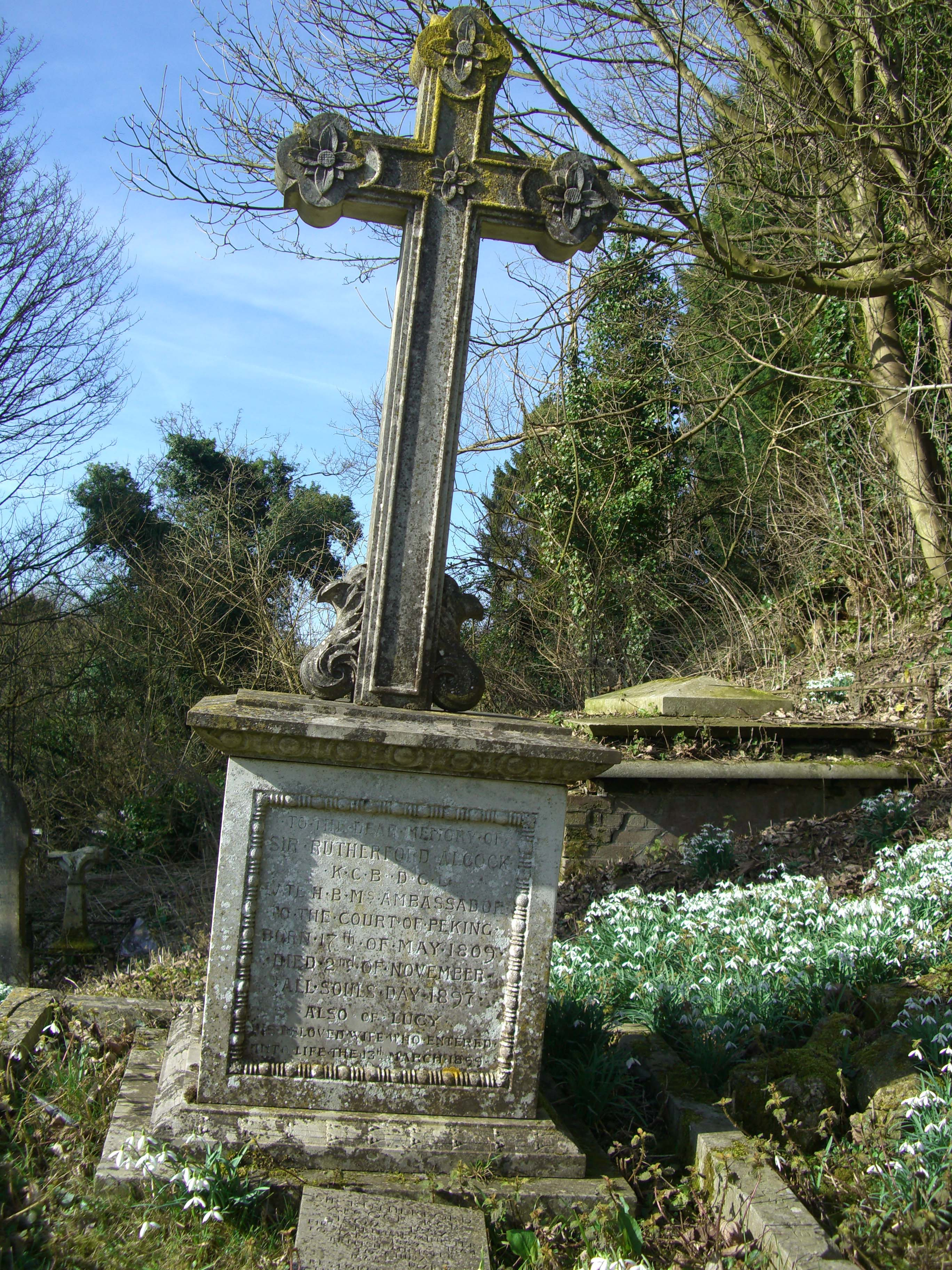
The grave of Rutherford Alcock at St Katharine's, Merstham.

Although no longer in official life, he remained active. He was for some years president of the Royal Geographical Society, and he served on many commissions. The official Japanese section at the 1862 International Exhibition in London was prepared by Sir Rutherford and included his own collection. This is considered one of the most important events in the history of Japanese art in the West and a founding date for English Japonism in the decorative arts, the Anglo-Japanese style. From 1882-93 he was chairman of the British North Borneo Chartered Company.

He was twice married, first in May 1841 to Henrietta Mary Bacon (daughter of Charles Bacon), who died in 1853, and second (on 8 July 1862) to Lucy Lowder (née Windsor) widow of the Rev. John Lowder. Lucy died on 13 March 1899.

Alcock was the author of several works, and was one of the first to awaken in England an interest in Japanese art. He tried hard to learn the language and even wrote a textbook. His best-known book is The Capital of the Tycoon [= shogun], which appeared in 1863, whilst the Mikado's Seat was at Kyoto. He died in London on 2 November 1897, and is buried adjacent to Sir Lewis Pelly in St Katharine's Churchyard at Merstham in Surrey.

== Selected works ==
In a statistical overview derived from writings by and about Rutherford Alcock, OCLC/WorldCat encompasses roughly 70+ works in 100+ publications in 5 languages and 1,000+ library holdings.

- Notes on the Medical History and Statistics of the British Legion of Spain; Comprising the Results of Gunshot Wounds, in Relation to Important Questions in Surgery (1838)
- Life's Problems: Essays; Moral, Social, and Psychological (1857)
- Elements of Japanese Grammar, for the Use of Beginners (1861)
- Catalogue of Works of Industry and Art, Sent from Japan by Rutherford Alcock (1862)
- The Capital of the Tycoon: a Narrative of a Three Years' Residence in Japan (1863), a volume of memoirs covering his service in Japan, but only until March 1862 though he remained in that post until 1865.
- Correspondence with Sir Rutherford Alcock Respecting Missionaries at Hankow, and State of Affairs at Various Ports in China (1869)
- Despatch from Sir Rutherford Alcock Respecting a Supplementary Convention to the Treaty of Tien-Tsin, Signed by Him on October 23, 1869 by China (1870)
- Chinese Statesmen and State Papers (1871)
- Art and Art Industries in Japan (1878)
- Handbook of British North Borneo: Compiled from Reports Received from Governor Treacher and from other Officers in the British North Borneo Company's Service by Colonial and Indian Exhibition (1886)

== See also ==
- List of Ambassadors of the United Kingdom to Japan
- Sakoku
- List of Westerners who visited Japan before 1868
