= Date Tsunamura =

Japanese samurai (1659–1719)

- 伊達綱村
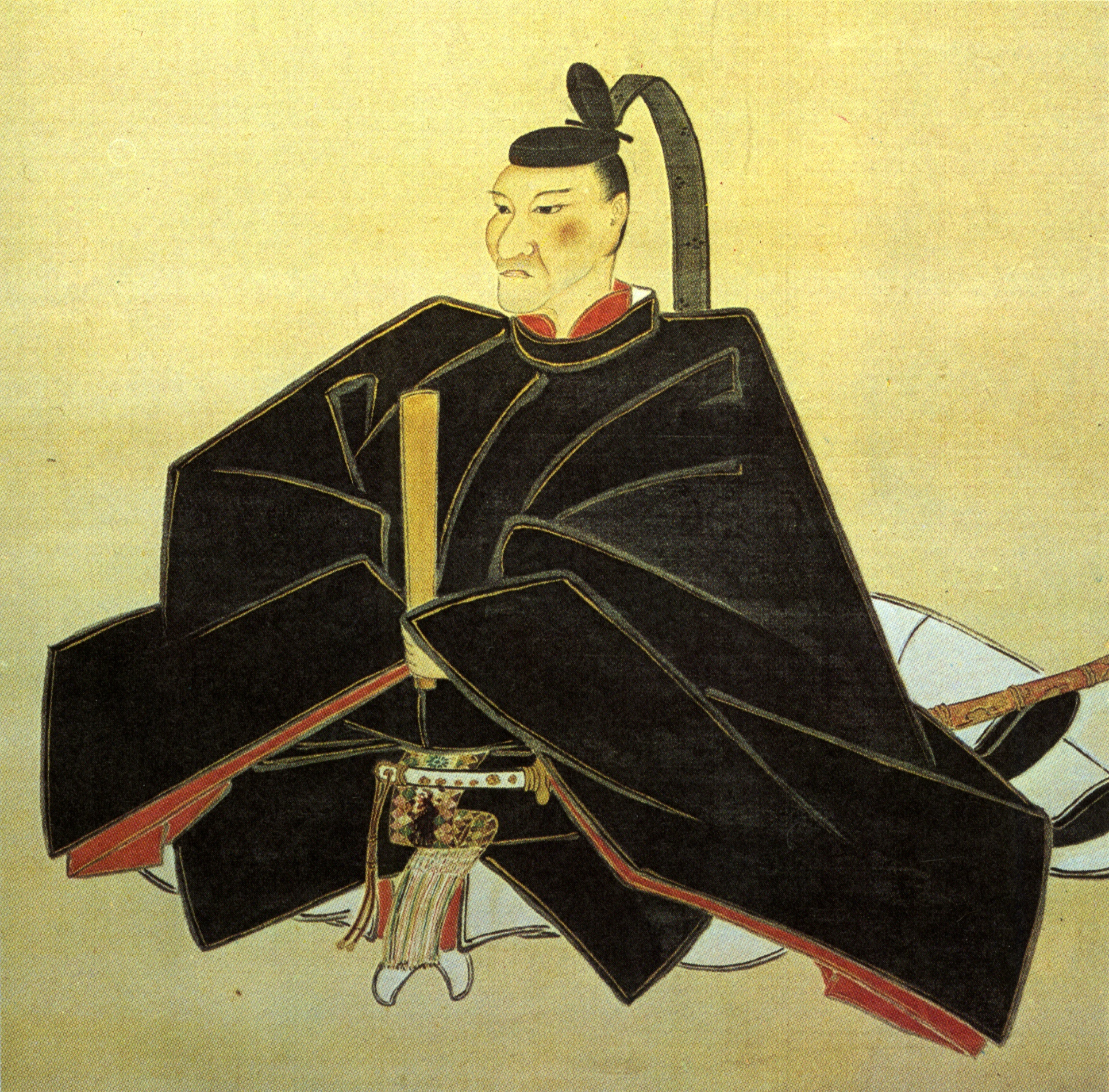
- Portrait of Date Tsunamura at Sendai City Museum

4th Daimyō of Sendai Domain
- In office 1660–1703
- Monarchs: Shōgun: Tokugawa Ietsuna; Tokugawa Tsunayoshi
- Preceded by: Date Tsunamune
- Succeeded by: Date Yoshimura

Personal details
- Born: April 29, 1659
- Died: August 5, 1719 (aged 60) Sendai, Japan
- Resting place: Dainenjiyama, Sendai, Miyagi, Japan
- Spouse: daughter of Inaba Masanori
- Parents: Date Tsunamune (father); Misawa Hatsuko (mother)

Date Tsunamura (伊達綱村; DAH-tay; 29 April 1659 – 5 August 1719) was an early Edo period Japanese samurai, and the fourth daimyō of Sendai Domain in northern Japan, and the 20h hereditary chieftain of the Date clan. Tsunamura's succession led to the Date Sōdō or "Date Disturbance" of 1671, which has been retold in theatre, and has become one of the more well-known tales of unrest and disunity among the daimyō of the Edo period.

== Biography ==
Tsunamura was the eldest son of Date Tsunamune by a concubine. His childhood name was Kamechiyo-maru (亀千代丸). He was later styled Date Tsunamoto (伊達綱基), but his name was changed to Date Tsunamura during his genpuku ceremony, which was held by shōgun Tokugawa Ietsuna. In later life, his courtesy title was Sakonoe-gon-shōshō (General of the Left Guards) and Mutsu-no-kami and his Court rank was Senior Fourth Rank, Lower Grade.

Tsunamura became daimyō at the age of 2, when his father was relieved of his position due to political manipulations by his uncles, Date Munekatsu, daimyō of Ichinoseki Domain and Date Masamune's 10th son, and Tamura Muneyoshi, daimyō of Iwanuma Domain. From 1660 to 1671, the two uncles acted as guardians for the infant Tsunamura, usurping his authority and becoming notorious for their greed, corruption and misgovernment. The domain was beset by constant peasant rebellions and (according to popular history) Tsumanura narrowly avoided assassination by his uncles on several occasions.

Events came to a head with the Date Sōdō, which also became a favorite theme of popular fiction, including bunraku and kabuki. Aki Muneshige, a relative from a cadet branch of the Date clan and retainer of Date Tsunamune managed to register a complaint to the shogunate officials about the mismanagement of the domain. Aki and various domain officials were summoned before the council of rōjū and the Tairō Sakai Tadakiyo. Testimony between Aki and the retainers of Munekatsu and Muneyoshi did not agree, and the testimony of Munekatsu's retainer Harada Munesuke made a particularly poor impression. Harada then murdered Aki before further testimony could be given, before being killed himself by the guards. The court ruled in favor of Aki. Tsunamura was allowed to remain daimyō; however, his uncles Munekatsu and Muneyoshi were removed from office.

Once Tsunamura actually was able to exercise his own authority, one of his first actions was to order the construction of windbreaks and irrigation and flood control works on rivers. He also emphasized the study of Confucianism, bringing several noted scholars to Sendai, as well as sponsoring the construction of numerous Buddhist temples and Shinto shrines. From 1689 to 1690 he assisted in the repair of the Nikkō Tōshō-gū along with Ii Naooki of Hikone Domain. Through these efforts, he gained the reputation of being a good ruler; however, the fiscal burden of all of these public works and temple building drove the domain into debt. In 1683, the domain issued a paper currency; however, with rampant inflation, the domain money was not well received. In 1693, his senior retainers had enough, and through senior clan members issued a petition to Tsunamura warning against rule by tyranny. Tsunamura was reportedly rendered speechless with rage, but was unable to gather support. In Autumn 1697, with no sign that he would voluntarily reign from office, his retainers plotted to have him forcibly placed into retirement, but no agreement could be reached. Tsunamura remained in office until 1703, when he resigned in favor of his cousin, Date Yoshimura, as he had no son by his wife (the daughter of Inaba Masanori).

Tsunamura died in 1719, and his grave is at Dainenjiyama in Sendai, rather than the Date clan mausoleum. In 1924, he was posthumously elevated to Senior Third Rank.

== Family ==
- Father: Date Tsunamune
- Mother: Misawa Hatsuko (1640–1686)
- Wife: Manjuji-dono (Senhime) (1659–1706)
  - 1st daughter: Kohime, died in childhood
  - 1st son: Ogichiyo, died in childhood
  - 2nd daughter Hakuhime, died in childhood
- Adopted Son: Date Yoshimura

== See also ==
- Date Sōdō
