= Sakai Tadakiyo =

Japanese daimyō (1624–1681)

Sakai Tadakiyo (酒井 忠清; November 29, 1624 – July 4, 1681), also known as Uta-no-kami, was a daimyō (feudal lord) in Kōzuke Province, and a high-ranking government advisor and official in the Tokugawa shogunate of Japan.

The Sakai were identified as one of the fudai or insider daimyō clans which were hereditary vassals or allies of the Tokugawa clan, in contrast with the tozama or outsider clans.

== Sakai clan genealogy ==
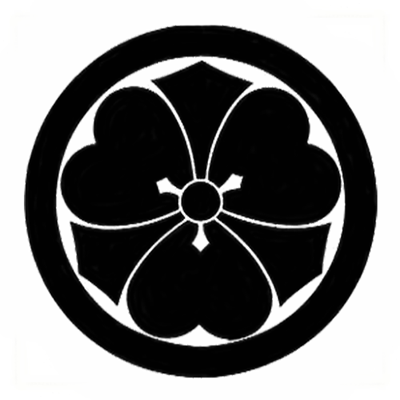
Emblem (mon) of the Sakai clan

Tadakiyo was part of the senior branch of the Sakai.

The fudai Sakai clan originated in 14th century Mikawa Province. The Sakai claim descent from Minamoto Arichika. Arichika had two sons: one of them, Yasuchika, took the name Matsudaira; and the other son, Chikauji, took the name Sakai — and this samurai ancestor is the progenitor of this clan's name.

Sakai Hirochika, who was the son of Chikauji, had two sons, and their descendants gave rise to the two main branches of the Sakai clan. Hirochika's younger son, Sakai Masachika, served several Tokugawa clan leaders – Nobutada, Kiyoyasu and Hirotada; and in 1561, Masachika was made master of Nishio Castle in Mikawa.

Sakai Sigetada, who was the son of Masachika, received the fief of Kawagoe Domain in Musashi Province in 1590; and then in 1601, Sigetada was transferred to Umayabashi Domain in Kōzuke Province.

In 1749, the descendants of Tadakiyo were transferred to Himeji Domain (150,000 koku) in Harima Province, where they continued to live up through the Meiji Restoration.

The head of this clan line was ennobled as a "Count" in the Meiji period.

== Events in Tadakiyo's life ==
Tadayiko served under shōgun Tokugawa Ietsuna as one of the Rōjū (chief advisor) from 1653–1666, and then as Tairō, head of the Rōjū council, from 1666–1680.

Generally regarded today as self-indulgent and corrupt, his policies (or lack thereof) are generally said to have been responsible for initiating the shift to hedonism and debauchery which characterized the Genroku era (1688–1704). Though a Golden Age for the arts, this era was regarded by the following generation of officials as one of immorality, impropriety, and excessive extravagance.

By the time Tadakiyo became head of the Rōjū in 1666, most of the capable and stalwart politicians who might have opposed him, such as Matsudaira Nobutsuna had died. Abe Tadaaki remained as his only significant critic, until his death in 1671. Tadaaki constantly rebuked Tadakiyo for his poor sense of proper policy, and his laidback nature. He accused Tadakiyo of taking bribes, and of handling situations on a case-by-case basis, without any sense of overall policy or progress towards a goal. Tadakiyo was also criticized by a number of daimyō, including a member of the Ikeda clan of Okayama Province, who warned of poor conditions and discontent in the provinces, and the threat of peasant revolt.

From 1658 to 1674, Tadakiyo took a personal interest in the affairs of the Date clan of Sendai, and particularly in the Date Disturbance, a now-famous succession dispute within the clan over leadership of the family and the role of daimyō. Tadakiyo was friendly with the former daimyō of the clan, Date Tadamune, whose son Date Tsunamune, was arrested in 1660, and forced to retire from his post on accusations of drunkenness and debauchery. The regents who governed over his successor, Tsunamune's infant son Date Tsunamura, were then accused in turn of corruption and poor government. This element of the affair dragged out for ten years before Tadakiyo summoned the key parties involved to Edo in order to conduct a formal inquiry; this ultimately ended in the death of one Sendai retainer at the hands of another, who was in turn cut down by the Tairō's guards.

Some historians believe that Tadakiyo could have, and should have, seen the entire affair to an end years earlier, and judge it likely therefore that he was taking bribes from Tsunamura's regents, who sought to draw out the situation and avoid any action being taken against them.

When Shogun Ietsuna died in 1680, Tadakiyo suggested that his successor be chosen from the princely houses of the Imperial family. This reportedly infuriated Rōjū Hotta Masatoshi, who had been appointed the previous year, and who vehemently objected to this obvious attempt on Tadakiyo's part to seize power for himself; Rōjū and Tairō wielded significant power, but were not meant to control shogunal succession, as this would also imply the ability to gain power over the shogun himself. Tadakiyo resigned his post, and Tokugawa Tsunayoshi, Ietsuna's younger brother, was installed the following day, appointing Masatoshi as Tadakiyo's successor as Tairō. Tadakiyo died the following year.
