= Tōzen-ji =

Buddhist temple in Takanawa, Japan

Coordinates: 35°38′03.33″N 139°44′06.52″E

- 東禅寺
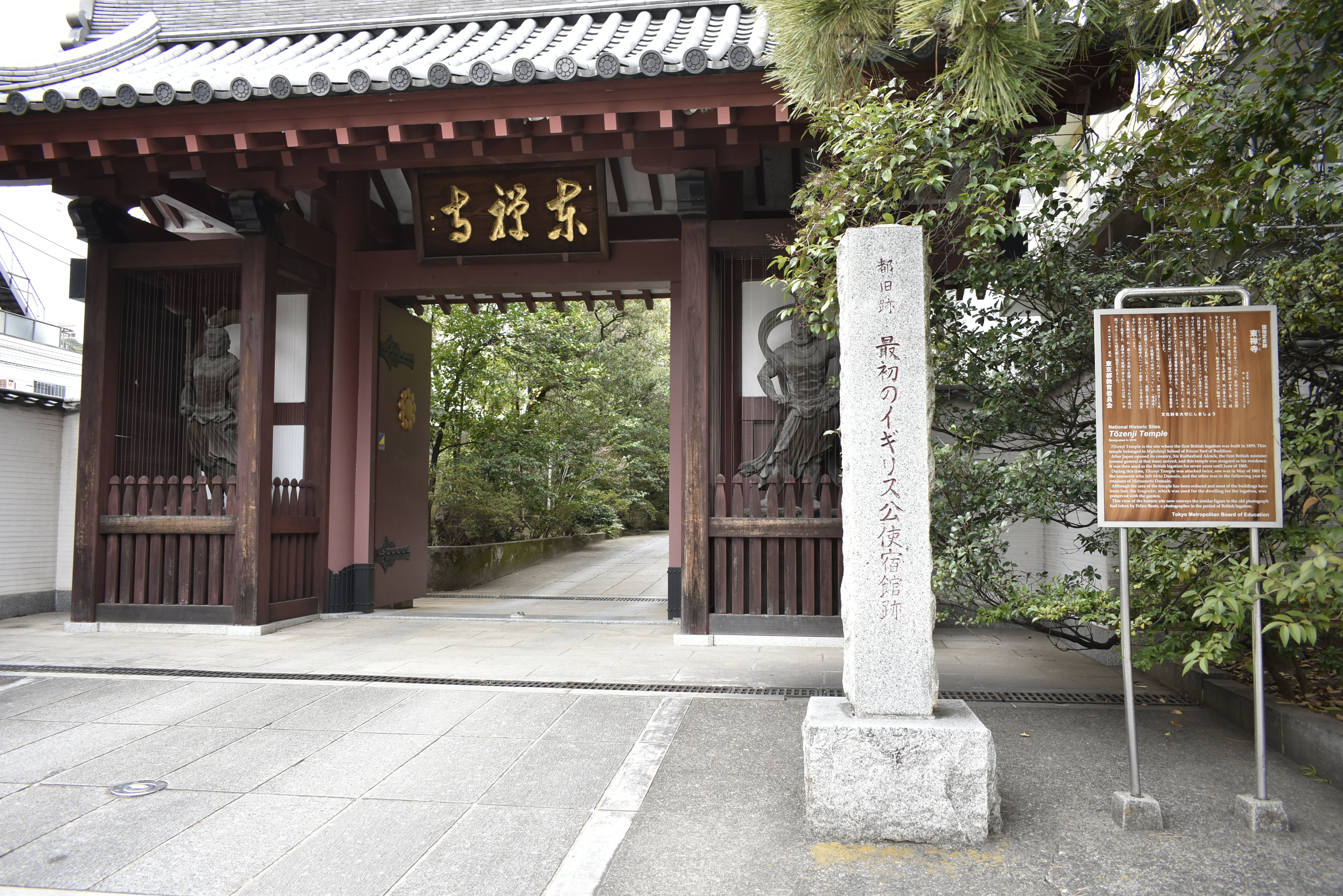
- Tōzen-ji

- Location within Tokyo Location within Japan

Religion
- Affiliation: Buddhist
- Rite: Rinzai school
- Status: functional

Location
- Location: 3-16-16 Takanawa, Minato-ku, Tokyo 108-0074
- Country: Japan
- Interactive map of Tōzen-ji

Architecture
- Completed: 1610

Tōzen-ji (東禅寺), is a Buddhist temple located in Takanawa, Minato, Tokyo, Japan. The temple belongs to the Myōshin-ji branch of the Rinzai school of Japanese Zen. One of the four great Zen temples of Edo, it is best known in history as the location of the first British legation in Japan during the Bakumatsu period and the site of a number of incidents against foreigners by pro-sonnō jōi samurai. The temple's precincts were designated a National Historic Site in 2010.

== History ==
The temple was established in 1610 in Akasaka by Ryōnan Zenji, and its name comes from the Dharma name of Itō Sukenori, daimyō of Obi Domain in Hyūga Province (preset day Miyazaki Prefecture). In 1636 it was relocated to its present location. At the time, the temple was directly on Edo Bay and for that reason was nicknamed Kaijō Zenrin (literally, "the Zen forest above the sea"). During the Edo Period it served as the bodaiji for a number of daimyō clans, including the:

- Date clan of Sendai Domain
- Date clan of Uwajima Domain
- Date clan of Iyo-Yoshida Domain
- Ikeda clan of Okayama Domain
- Ikeda clan of Akō Domain
- Ikeda clan of Kamogata Domain
- Ikeda clan of Ikusaka Domain
- Suwa clan of Suwa Domain
- Matsudaira clan of Kanō Domain
- Oda clan of Yanagimoto Domain
- Inaba clan of Usuki Domain
- Mōri clan of Saiki Domain

== The First Tōzenji incident ==
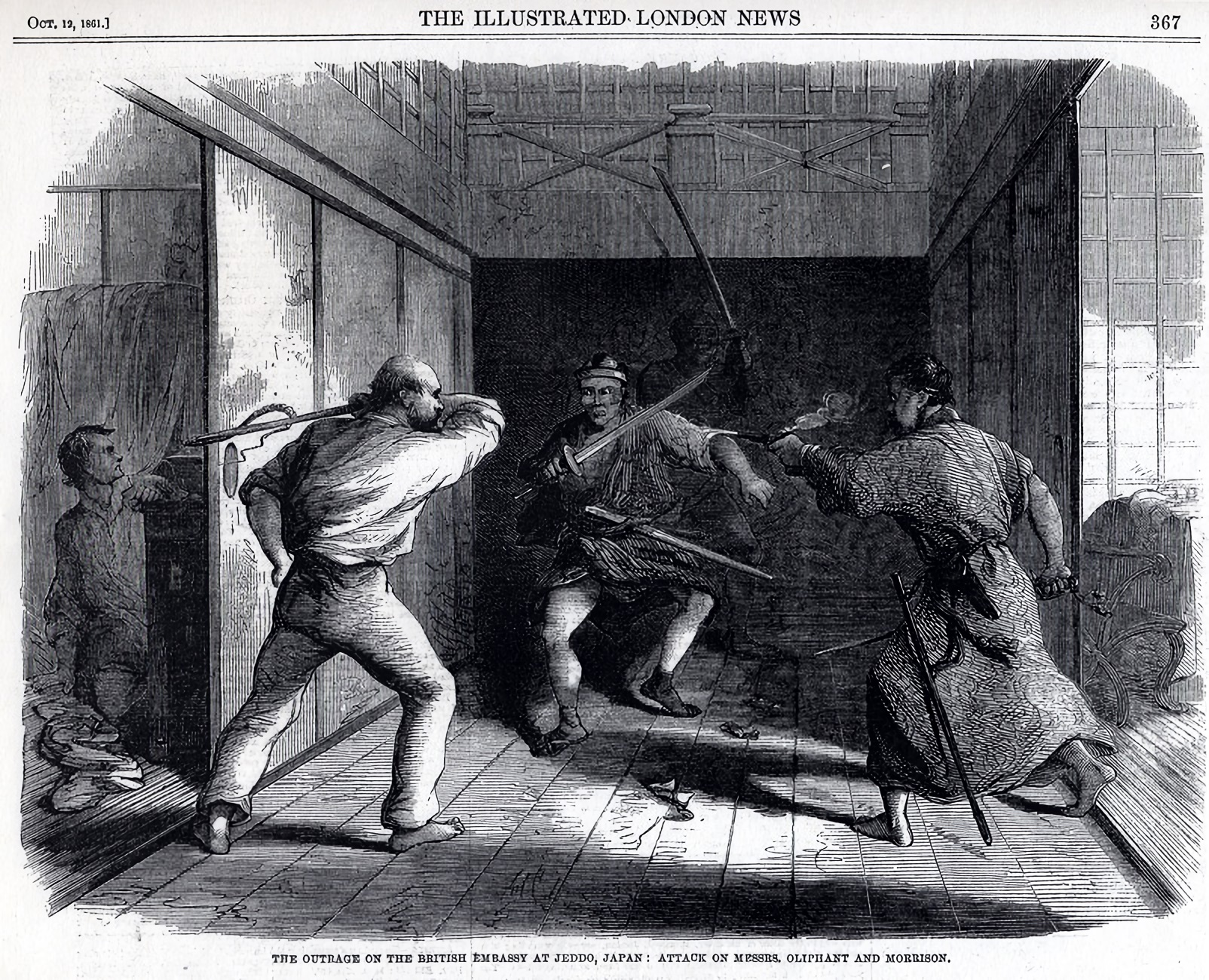
Attack on the British legation 1861

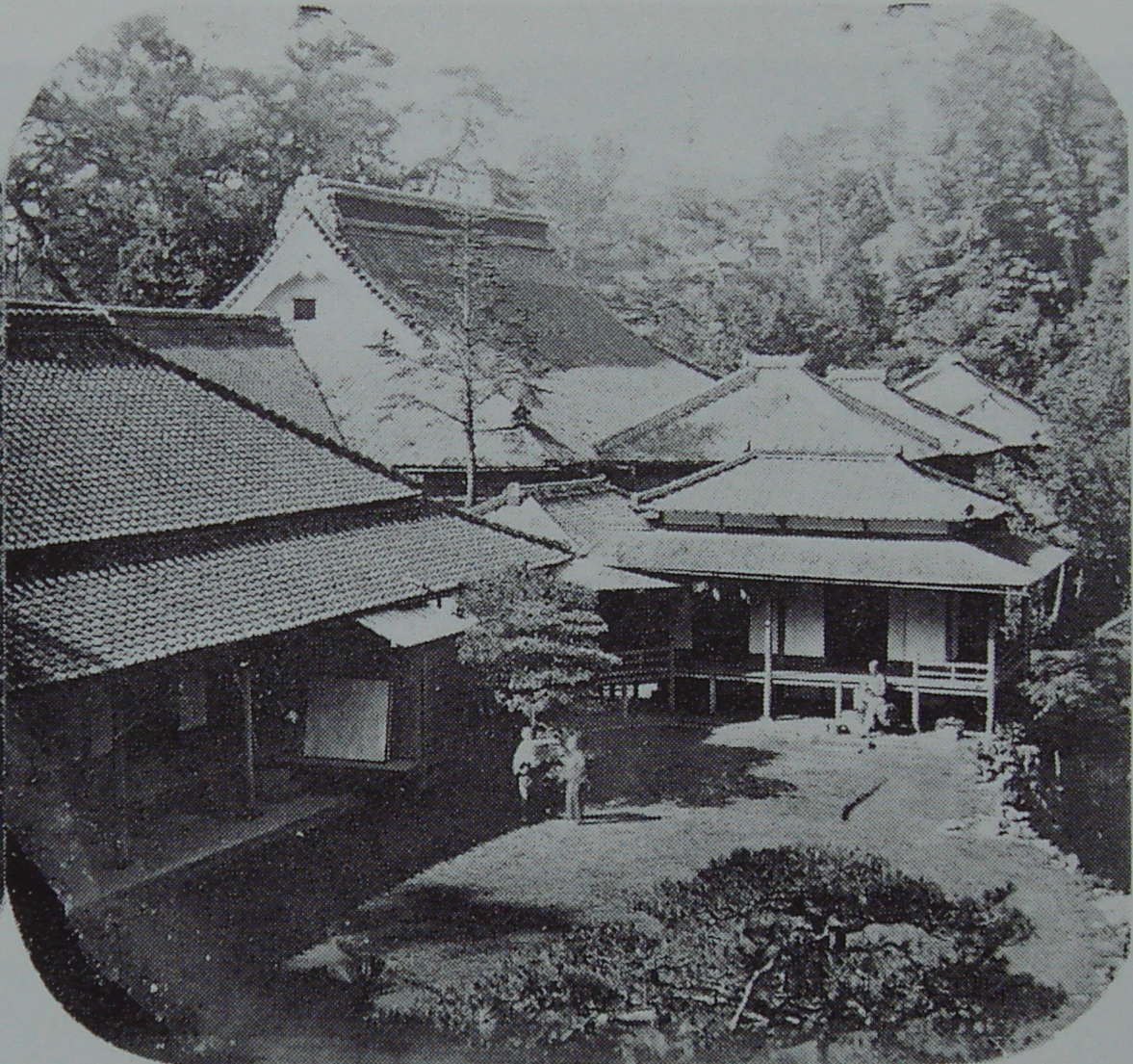
Tozen-ji in the 1860s

One of the provisions of the 1858 Anglo-Japanese Treaty of Amity and Commerce was that a representative of the British government would be permitted to reside in Edo. Rutherford Alcock was appointed Consul-General in Japan and selected Tōzen-ji to be used as the site of the British legation. It had been the policy of the Tokugawa Shogunate to commandeer temples for temporary use by foreign dignitaries, and Alcock felt that Tōzen-ji was of a suitable size and status. Japanese authorities were against the choice of Edo and advised Alcock to settle in Yokohama, especially as Tōzen-ji was located at the entrance to the Tōkaidō, the busiest and most important highway in Japan, and was therefore exposed to possible attacks. Alcock would not be deterred and the British legation was opened in 1859. In January 1860, Kobayashi Denkichi, the native interpreter of Rutherford Alcock, was murdered at the gate of the legation by two rōnin, foreshadowing further trouble which was to come.

In May, Alcock returned to Edo from a visit to Nagasaki. Although the Shogunate had requested that he return by ship due to security reasons, he insisted on traveling overland to uphold one of the provisions of the treaty, namely that the movement of diplomats within Japan not be restricted. This greatly incensed the sonnō jōi party, especially a number of extremist rōnin formerly of Mito Domain. Led by Ariga Hanya, a number of rōnin assembled at the Toraya inn at Shinagawa-juku, and made their attack on the night of July 5, 1861 at 10 PM. Within the legation, some of the staff had stayed awake to follow the passage of a comet while Alcock slept in his apartments. There was a squad of sentries guarding the legation from Nishio Domain and Yamato-Kōriyama Domain but no particular precautions had been taken. The situation had returned to normal after the events of 1860 and no one suspected an imminent attack. When the Mito rōnin stormed the legation, the Japanese sentries fought back vigorously, killing three (including Ariga) and capturing three others. Two of the defenders were killed, and ten wounded, including George Morrison and the writer Laurence Oliphant, who were later sent back to England to recover. Alcock had time to load his revolver and fire a few shots before the battle was over.

Of the three captured rōnin, one was executed by beheading and two committed seppuku. Of those who escaped the battle, four were found at the Toraya inn (of whom one committed seppuku rather than surrender, two were captured and committed seppuku, and one was executed), two were later killed during the Sakashitamon incident and one at the Tenchūgumi incident, and two more were killed at other locations. Only two of the participants survived until after the Meiji restoration. Alcock, who had bitterly protested the presence of the Japanese guards as a nuisance and accused them of being nothing more than spies for the Shogunate finally realized the depth of anti-foreign sentiment. He threatened that he would use the attack as a casus belli unless the shogunate agreed to permit a British garrison to be stationed at the legation, the number of Japanese guards increased, and compensation of $10,000 to be paid. The shogunate was forced to concede to all of these demands. Even so, Alcock would later write in his memoirs that the Japanese guards assigned did nothing to fight the attackers and it was only by his own heroism and that of Morrison and Olipant that they were driven off - not mentioning the two dead and ten injured Japanese defenders. Sword cuts and bullet marks from the attack remain in the pillars of the main hall of the temple. Rutherford Alcock, the first British Minister to Japan, recorded his impressions of Tōzen-ji in his book, The Capital of the Tycoon (1863).

== The Second Tōzenji incident ==
After the incident, Alcock moved the legation to the treaty port of Yokohama, stating that he did not trust the Japanese and was dissatisfied with the compensation being offered. However, in May 1862, Lieutenant Colonel Edward St. John Neale who had assumed duties as Chargé d'affaires in Japan during Alcock's period of extended home leave ordered the legation to be returned to Tōzenji, pending the construction of a new purpose-built diplomatic compound at nearby Gotenyama. The staff, including a contingent from the Royal Marines, numbered around 30 men. The Shogunate ordered Ōgaki, Kishiwada and Matsumoto Domains to provide security, for a total of 500 men. One of the guards from Matsumoto, Itō Gunbei, was concerned about the expense his domain was incurring providing this security and about the possibility that he would be forced to kill fellow Japanese in order to protect the hated foreigners, so he decided to assassinate Neale himself. In the early morning of June 27, 1862 he attempted to break into Neale's bedroom but was discovered by the Royal Marines and killed two men from HMS Renard before he was subdued. He subsequently committed seppuku, and the British withdrew back to Yamate, in Yokohama. The incident resulted in the creation of the permanent British Military Garrison in Japan and marked the final abandonment of the use of Tōzen-ji as the official residence of the British legation in Japan.

== Gallery ==
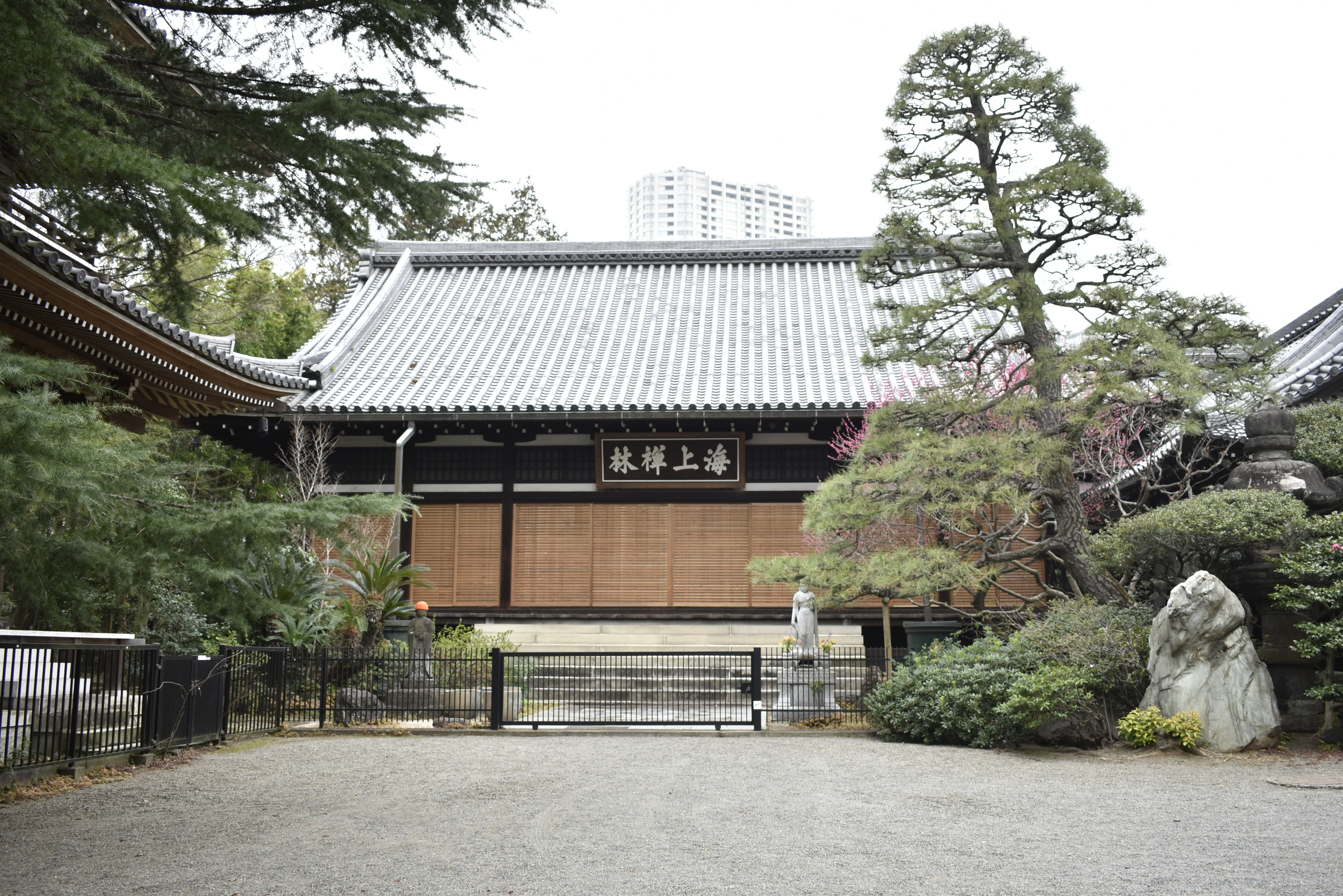
Hondō

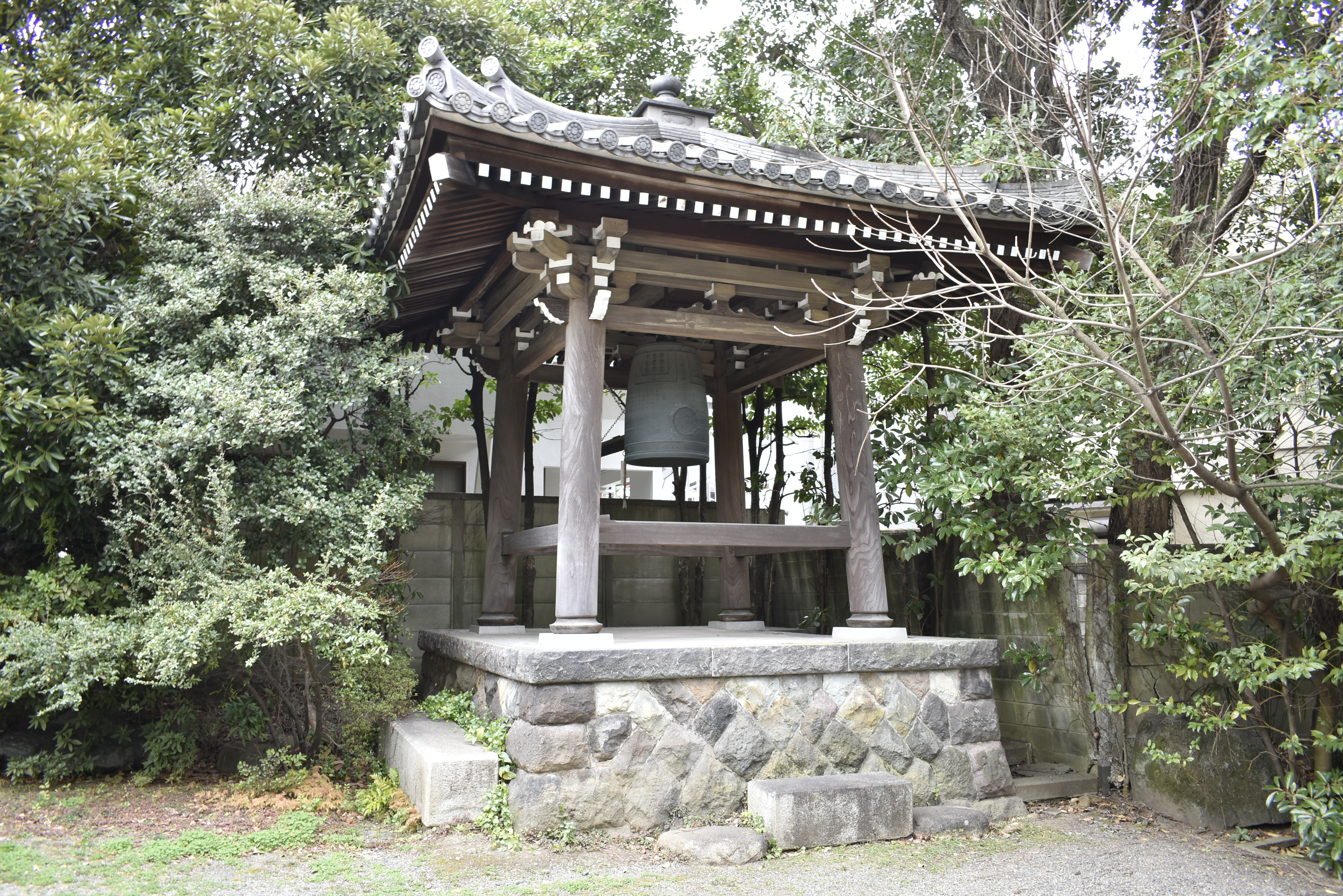
Bonshō

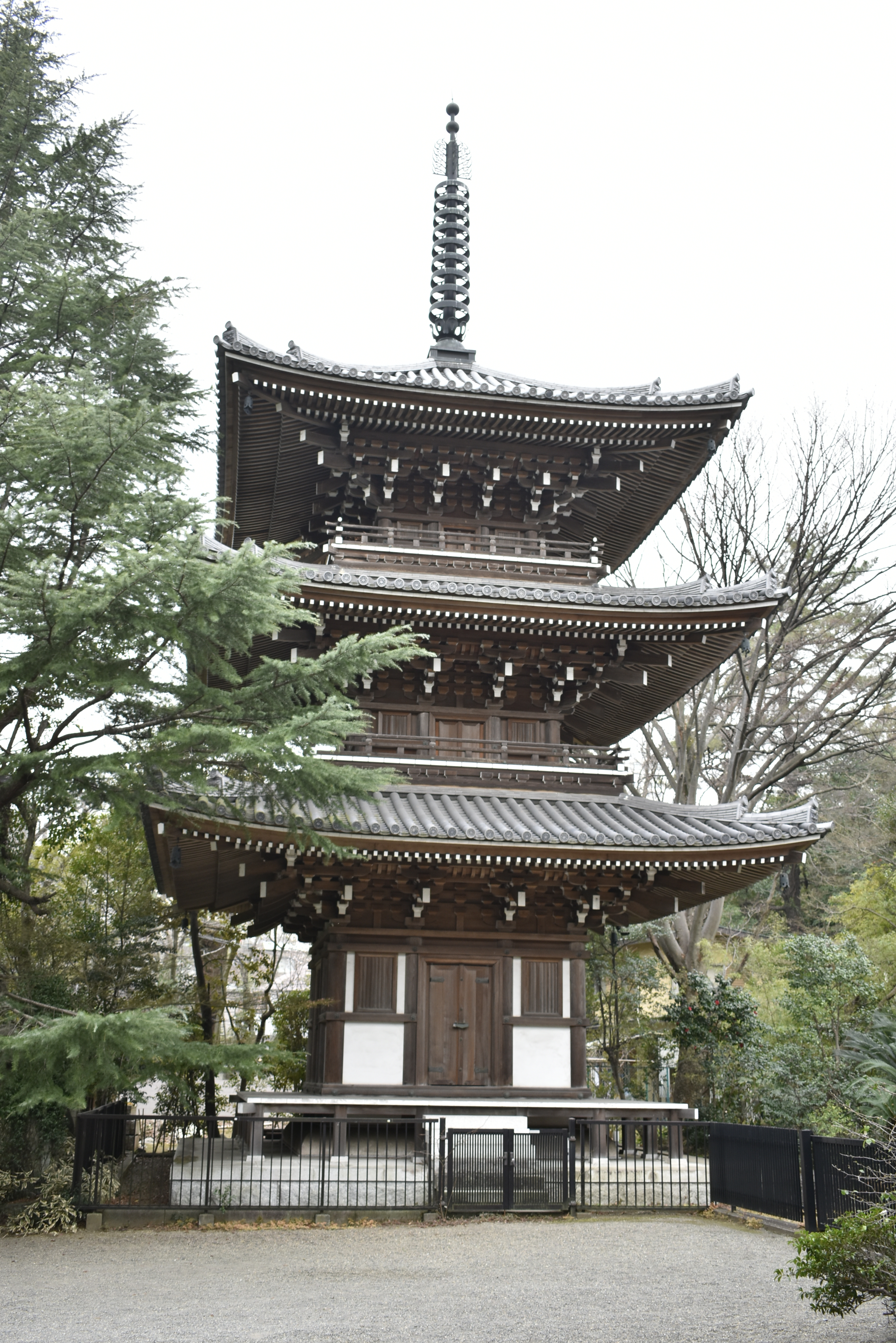
3-story pagoda

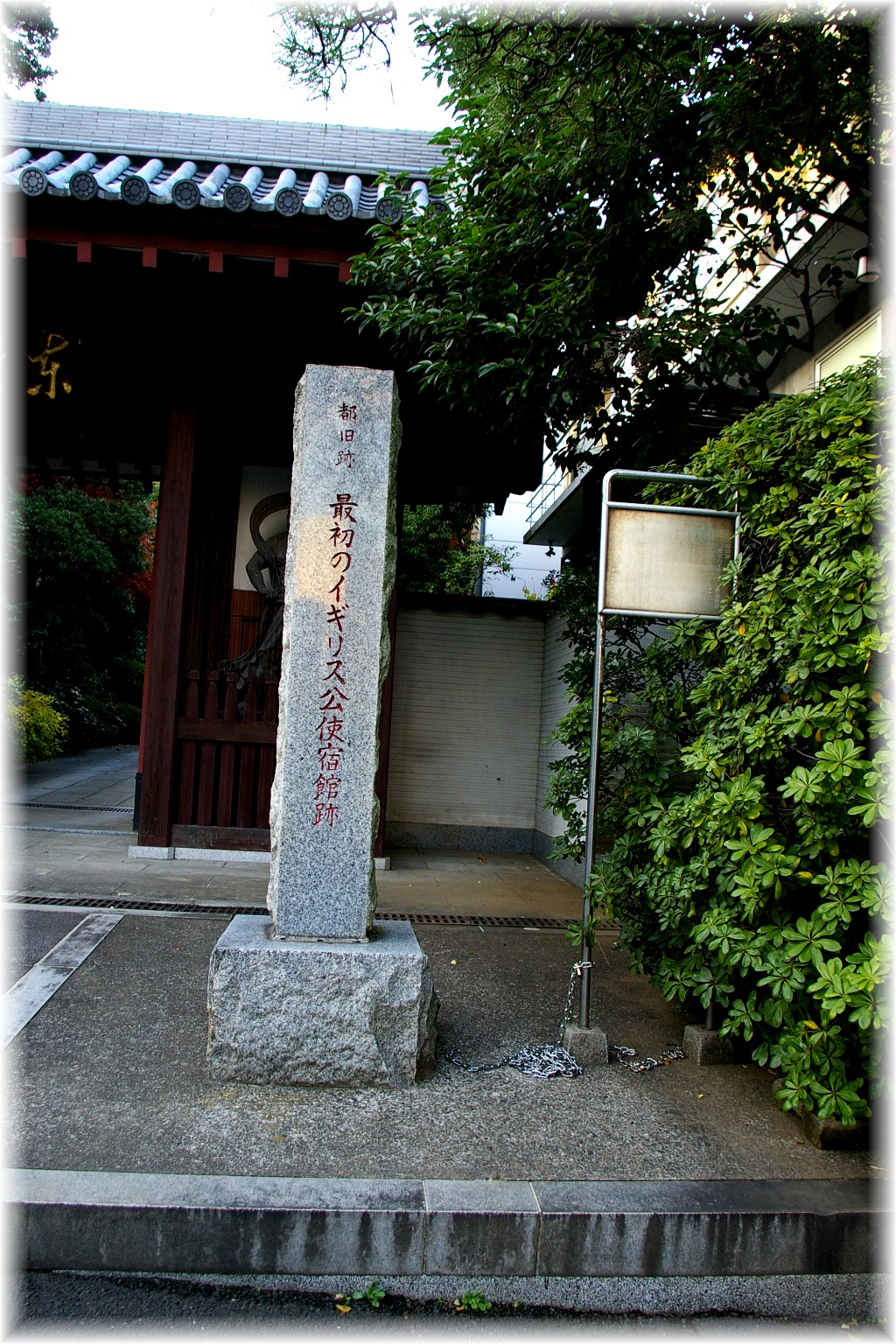
Site of first British Legation in Japan

== See also ==
- List of Historic Sites of Japan (Tōkyō)
