= O-Ie Sōdō =

Noble family disputes in Japan

O-Ie Sōdō (御家騒動, "house strife") were noble family disputes within the samurai and aristocratic classes of Japan, particularly during the early Edo period (17th century). The most famous is the Date Sōdō, which broke out among the Date family in the 1660s–70s.

The Tokugawa shogunate which ruled Japan in the Edo period established itself by subjugating warlords (daimyō), militant religious groups (ikki) and other violent groups; their control was predicated on a forcibly imposed peace. As a result, these sorts of noble house disputes, which often came quite close to erupting into outright battle and which often took place among the powerful tozama families, posed a serious threat to the stability of the bakuhan (shogunate-fiefdom) political system. These events were thus taken very seriously by the government, but also became very popular tales among the people, and were regarded as being quite interesting and exciting, due to the political and physical conflict involved. A number were related in books and several were even transformed into plays and performed on the kabuki or bunraku stage, under the genre known as O-ie-mono (御家物) or O-Ie Kyōgen (御家狂言).

== Notable family disputes ==
- 1608 – Tsutsui clan, Iga-Ueno Domain (Tsutsui Sōdō)
- 1614 – Ōkubo Nagayasu (Ōkubo family), Odawara Domain
- 1617 – Mogami clan, Yamagata Domain (Mogami Sōdō)
- 1626 – Sō clan, Tsushima Domain (Yanagawa Iken)
- 1633 – Kuroda clan, Fukuoka Domain
- 1634 – Tsugaru clan, Hirosaki Domain (Funabashi Sōdō)
- 1635 – Kamei clan, Tsuwano Domain (Enchi Sōdō)
- 1639 – Katō clan, Aizu Domain
- 1640 – Ikoma clan, Takamatsu Domain
- 1640 – Ikeda clan, Yamasaki Domain
- 1640 – Sagara clan, Hitoyoshi Domain (Oshimo no Ran)
- 1648 – Inaba clan, Fukuchiyama Domain (Tamba-Fukuchiyama Sōdō)
- 1648 – Yoshida clan, Hamada Domain
- 1648 – Kitsuregawa clan, Kitsuregawa Domain
- 1660–1671 – Date clan, Sendai Domain (Date Sōdō, Tsunamune Inkyo Jiken)
- 1679 – Matsudaira clan, Takata Domain (Echigo Sōdō)
- 1697 – Date clan, Sendai Domain (Tsunamura Inkyo Jiken)
- 1748 – Maeda clan, Kaga Domain (Kaga Sōdō)
- 1754 – Satake clan, Akita Domain (Satake Sōdō)
- 1759 – Sagara clan, Hitoyoshi Domain (Take-teppō Jiken)
- 1808 – Shimazu clan, Satsuma Domain
- 1824 – Sengoku clan, Izushi Domain
- 1849 – Shimazu clan, Satsuma Domain (Oyura Sōdō)
