= Date Sōdō =

Noble family dispute within the Date samurai clan in 1671

The Date Sōdō (伊達騒動), or Date Disturbance, was a noble family dispute within the Date samurai clan, which occurred in 1671.

== History ==
In 1660, the daimyō (feudal lord) of the Sendai Domain, and clan head, Date Tsunamune was arrested in Edo, for drunkenness and debauchery. The charges are generally believed to have been true, but the arrest was probably encouraged heavily by certain vassals and kinsmen in the north. These vassals and kinsmen appealed to the Council of Elders in Edo that Tsunamune was not fit to rule, and that his son Date Tsunamura, great-grandson of Masamune, should become the daimyō. Thus, Tsunamura became daimyō, under the guardianship of his uncles, Date Munekatsu and Muneyoshi.

Ten years of violence and conflict followed in the domain, reaching a climax in 1671 when Aki Muneshige, a powerful relative of the Date, complained to the shogunate of the mismanagement of the fief under Tsunamura and his uncles. The Metsuke (Inspector) for the region attempted to deal with the situation, and to act as a mediator, but was unsuccessful against Aki's determination.

The Metsuke reported back to Edo, and Aki was soon summoned there to argue his case before various councils and officials, including the Tairō Sakai Tadakiyo and members of the Rōjū council. Following his arrival on the 13th day of the second lunar month, he met with and was interrogated and examined, as were several other retainers of the Date on both sides of the dispute. One retainer in particular, a supporter of Tsunamura and his uncles, by the name of Harada Kai Munesuke made a particularly poor impression in his meetings, and is said to have left the interrogation in a sour mood.

Towards the end of the month, all the Date retainers involved were summoned to the Tairō's mansion for a further round of questioning. It is said that over the course of the day, Harada grew increasingly distressed as he realized the extent to which his answers clashed with those of Aki Muneshige. According to one version of events, Harada, following a series of questions, was waiting in another room when Aki came in and began to shout insults at him. Swords were then drawn, and Aki was killed. Harada was killed moments after, by the officials or their guards.

A trial was soon held, the murder being made a more severe crime for having been committed in the home of a high government official. The official verdict was that Harada drew first, and the punishment was severe. The Harada family was destroyed, Harada's sons and grandsons executed, and though Tsunamura was affirmed as the proper daimyō, his uncles were punished. Aki was judged to be a paragon of loyalty, and no action was taken against his family.

This story inspired a number of cultural productions, most notably the jōruri (puppet theater) play, later adopted into kabuki, Meiboku Sendai Hagi, by Chikamatsu. In this production, as in many other retellings of the tale, Harada is undoubtedly the villain, Aki the hero. Historians, however, are skeptical about the accuracy of this black-and-white approach, and claim that there were likely other elements to the narrative which are not clear from the formal records. One side or the other in the dispute may have bribed government officials in order to affect the government's handling of the situation, and it is known that Sakai Tadakiyo was a friend of Tsunamune, thus perhaps altering the shogunate's behavior in this matter further.
