= Tairō =

High-ranking position within the Tokugawa Shogunate

Tairō (Japanese: 大老, "great elder") was a high-ranking official position in the Tokugawa shogunate government of Japan, roughly comparable to the office of prime minister. The tairō presided over the governing rōjū council in the event of an emergency. A tairō was nominated from among the fudai daimyōs, who worked closely with the Tokugawa traditionally. Generally, the office holder was the shogunate's chief policymaker, and provided Japan with a capable temporary leader in the absence of a shōgun, or in the event that the shōgun was incapacitated.

== List of tairō ==
Name	From	To	Shogun
Sakai Tadayo	March 12, 1636	March 19, 1636	Tokugawa Iemitsu
Doi Toshikatsu	November 7, 1638	July 10, 1644	Tokugawa Iemitsu
Sakai Tadakatsu	November 7, 1638	May 26, 1656	Tokugawa Iemitsu; Tokugawa Ietsuna
Sakai Tadakiyo	March 29, 1666	December 9, 1680	Tokugawa Ietsuna
Ii Naozumi	November 19, 1668	January 3, 1676	Tokugawa Ietsuna
Hotta Masatoshi	November 12, 1681	August 28, 1684	Tokugawa Tsunayoshi
Ii Naooki	June 13, 1696	March 2, 1700	Tokugawa Tsunayoshi
Yanagisawa Yoshiyasu	January 11, 1706	June 3, 1709	Tokugawa Tsunayoshi
Ii Naooki	February 13, 1711	February 23, 1714	Tokugawa Ienobu; Tokugawa Ietsugu
Ii Naoyuki	November 28, 1784	September 1, 1787	Tokugawa Ieharu; Tokugawa Ienari
Ii Naoaki	December 28, 1835	May 13, 1841	Tokugawa Ienari; Tokugawa Ieyoshi
Ii Naosuke	April 23, 1858	March 24, 1860	Tokugawa Iesada; Tokugawa Iemochi
Sakai Tadashige	February 1, 1865	November 12, 1865	Tokugawa Iemochi

== See also ==
- The Five Tairō
