= Date Tadamune =

Samurai and second daimyō of Sendai (1600-1658)

- 伊達忠宗
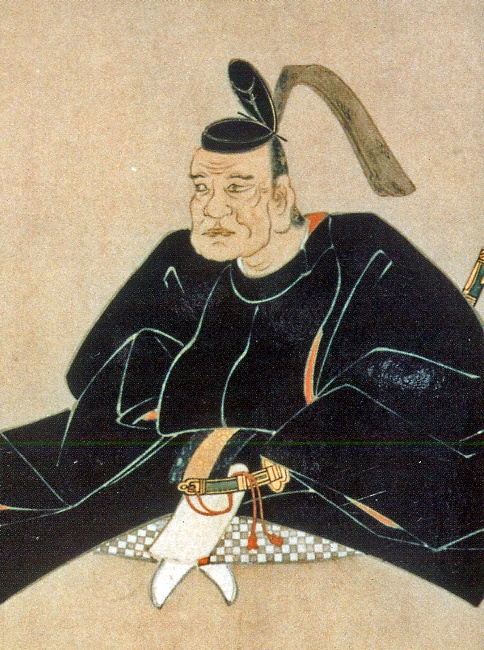
- Portrait of Date Tadamune at Sendai City Museum

Daimyō of Sendai Domain
- In office 1636–1658
- Preceded by: Date Masamune
- Succeeded by: Date Tsunamune

Personal details
- Born: January 23, 1600 Edo, Japan
- Died: August 10, 1658 (aged 58) Edo, Japan
- Spouse: Ikeda Terumasa's daughter
- Parents: Date Masamune (father); Megohime (mother)
- Resting place: Zuihōden, Sendai, Miyagi, Japan

Date Tadamune (伊達忠宗; DAH-tay; 23 January 1600 – 10 August 1658) was an early Edo period Japanese samurai, and the second daimyō of the 625,000 koku Sendai Domain in the Tōhoku region of northern Japan. He was the half-brother of Date Hidemune of Uwajima Domain.

== Biography ==
Tadamune was born as Torakikumaru (虎菊丸) later Sōjirō (総次郎) the second son of Date Masamune. Although he was the second son, his elder half-brother Date Hidemune was born by Lady Iisaka, a concubine, and was thus not eligible to rule. At the age of seven, he was betrothed to Ichi-hime, the 5th daughter of Tokugawa Ieyasu; however, she died three years later, and he was betrothed again to the daughter of Ikeda Terumasa, who was also Ieyasu's grand-daughter. In 1611, shōgun Tokugawa Hidetada presided over his genpuku ceremony, and he received courtesy title was Mimasaka-no-kami, and Senior Fifth Rank, Lower Grade Court rank. He also received permission from the shōgun to use the Matsudaira surname as an honorific.

At the time of the 1614 Siege of Osaka, he accompanied his father in the train of Tokugawa Ieyasu, and it was by order of Ieyasu that Date Hidemune was ordered to establish an independent branch of the Date clan at Uwajima in Shikoku with a kokudaka of 100,000 koku, whereas Date Tadamune was confirmed as heir to the main Date line at Sendai.

Tadamune was elevated to Junior Fourth Rank, Lower Grade, and given the honorary title of chamberlain in 1616. In 1624, his courtesy title was changed to Echizen-no-kami, and changed again in 1626 to Sakonoe-gon-shōshō (General of the Left Guards).

On Masamune's death in June 1636, he became daimyō, and entered Aoba Castle in Sendai for the first time in August of the same year. He immediately took over the reins of government by replacing two of the six bugyōs, and re-establishing a multi-person system of magistrates and inspectors to provide more oversight and to eliminate corruption and arbitrary rule. He followed this the following year by publishing a new code of rules and regulations for the domain. In 1639, his courtesy title was changed to Mutsu-no-kami.

In terms of finances, from 1640 to 1643 he ordered a complete re-survey of the domain, bringing units of measurements in line with the nationwide standards used by the Tokugawa shogunate. This was accompanied by large scale land reform. Tadamune also established a system whereby the domain purchased all rice produced in the domain, and reselling in Edo, paying the farmers in advance. This encouraged the opening of new rice lands.

During Tadamune's tenure, Sendai Castle was completed, and he sponsored the construction of numerous temples and shrines, including the Zuihōden in 1637 and the Sendai Tōshōgū in 1654.

On Tadamune's death on 12 July 1658, one of his senior retainers, Furuuchi Shigehiro, committed ritual suicide (junshi). Tadamune's sixth son Date Tsunamune became daimyō of Sendai.

== Family ==
The emblem (mon) of the Date clan

- Father: Date Masamune
- Mother: Megohime (Daughter of Tamura Kiyoaki)
- Wife: Furihime (1607–1659), daughter of Ikeda Terumasa and adopted daughter of Tokugawa Hidetada; also called Kōshōin
  - daughter: Nabehime (1623–1680) married Tachibana Tadashige, daimyō of Yanagawa Domain
  - 1st son: Torachiyo (1624–1630)
  - 2nd son: Date Mitsumune (1627–1645)
- Concubine: Fusu (Daughter of Mitamura Matauemon; also called Shōunin)
  - 3rd son: Tamura Muneyoshi (1637-1678), daimyō of Iwanuma Domain
  - 7th son: Date Munenori (1643–1685), adopted by hatamoto Date Kunitaka of the cadet Iwaya-Date clan
- Concubine: Zuishōin (Daughter of Nagata Tadashige)
  - 4th son: Date Gorokichi (1638–1644), adopted by hatamoto Shiroishi Munesada of the cadet Tome-Date clan
  - 5th son: Date Munetomo (1640–1670), adopted as heir to the Tome-Date clan by his elder brother Date Gorokichi
- Concubine: Kaihime (1624–1642, adopted daughter of Kushige Takachika; also called Tokushōin)
  - 6th son: Date Tsunamune (1640-1711), daimyō of Sendai Domain
- Concubine: Take (Daughter of Yamato Tosa; also called Keiunin)
  - 8th son: Date Munefusa (1646–1686), adopted by the Miyatoko-Date clan; father of Date Yoshimura
  - 9th son: Īzaka Muneakira (1648–1663, adopted by the Izaka clan
