= Hotta =

Hotta (written: 堀田) is a Japanese surname. Notable people with the surname include:

- Akane Hotta (堀田 茜, born 1992), Japanese model and television personality
- Daiki Hotta (堀田 大暉, born 1994), Japanese footballer
- Hotta Masamori (堀田 正盛, 1606–1651), Japanese daimyō
- Hotta Masatoshi (堀田 正俊, 1634–1684), Japanese daimyō
- Hotta Masatsugu (堀田 正頌, 1842–1896), Japanese daimyō
- Hotta Masayasu (堀田 正養, 1848–1911), Japanese daimyō
- Hotta Masayoshi (堀田 正睦, 1810–1864), Japanese daimyō
- Mayu Hotta (堀田 真由, born 1998), Japanese actress
- Mitsuru Hotta (堀田 満, 1935–2015), Japanese botanist
- Shuhei Hotta (堀田 秀平, born 1989), Japanese footballer
- Yumi Hotta (堀田 由美, born 1957), Japanese manga artist
- Yumiko Hotta (堀田 祐美子, born 1967), Japanese professional wrestler and mixed martial artist

== See also ==
- Hotta clan
