= Ōmi-Miyagawa Domain =

Ōmi-Miyagawa Domain 近江宮川藩
- under Tokugawa shogunate Japan
- 1698–1871
- Capital: Ōmi-Miyagawa jin'ya
- Area
  - Coordinates: 35°23′20.49″N 136°19′43.00″E
  - Type: Daimyō
- Historical era: Edo period
  - Established: 1698
  - Disestablished: 1871
- Today part of: part of Shiga Prefecture

Ōmi-Miyagawa Domain (近江宮川藩, Ōmi-Miyagawa-han) was a Fudai feudal domain under the Tokugawa shogunate of Edo period Japan. It was located in southeastern Ōmi Province, in the Kansai region of central Honshu. The domain was centered at Miyagawa jin'ya, located in what is now the city of Nagahama in Shiga Prefecture.

== History ==
Hotta Masamori was a general under Tokugawa Ieyasu and a high-ranking retainer of Tokugawa Iemitsu. He rose to the position of daimyō of Sakura Domain (110,000 koku). However, his son, Hota Masanobu came into conflict with the rōjū and his domain was confiscated in 1660. Masanobu's son, Hotta Masayasu, was pardoned in 1682 and allowed to return to the ranks of the daimyō, albeit as daimyō of Yoshii Domain in Kōzuke Province with a kokudaka of only 10,000 koku. He was transferred to Miyagawa in northern Ōmi Province in 1698, which marks the start of Ōmi-Miyagawa Domain. Under the 3rd daimyō, Hotta Masanobu, in 1748 the domain gained an additional 3000 koku. Under the 5th daimyō, Hotta Masatane 3600 koku in Ōmi were exchanged for an equivalent fief in Harima Province; however, the lands in Harima proved to be far more productive and the domain benefitted from this exchange. The 6th daimyō, Hotta Masatami with a cultural figure and a noted painter.

During the Bakumatsu period, the domain initially sided with the shogunate, but facing pressure from all surrounding domains who supported the Emperor, quickly changed sides at the start of the Boshin War. As with all domains, Miyakawa Domain was abolished in 1870 with the abolition of the han system. It subsequently was incorporated into Nagahama Prefecture, Inukami Prefecture, and then Shiga Prefecture. Hotta Masayasu, the final daimyō, was subsequently ennobled with the kazoku peerage title of viscount and served in the Meiji government as Minister of Communications.

== Bakumatsu period holdings ==
As with most domains in the han system, Miyagawa Domain consisted of a discontinuous territories calculated to provide the assigned kokudaka, based on periodic cadastral surveys and projected agricultural yields.

- Ōmi Province
  - 4 villages in Shiga District
  - 3 villages in Yasu District
  - 5 villages in Kōka District
  - 5 villages in Gamō District
  - 3 villages in Echi District
  - 16 villages in Sakata District

== List of daimyō ==
- Hotta clan (Fudai) 1698-1871

	Name	Tenure	Courtesy title	Court Rank	kokudaka
1	Hotta Masayasu (堀田正休)	1698–1715	Buzen-no-kami (豊前守)	Junior 5th Rank, Lower Grade (従五位下)	10,000 koku
2	Hotta Masatomo (堀田正朝)	1715–1719	Suruga-no-kami (駿河守)	Junior 5th Rank, Lower Grade (従五位下)	10,000 koku
3	Hotta Masanobu (堀田正陳)	Kaga-no-kami (加賀守)	Junior 5th Rank, Lower Grade (従五位下)	10,000 ->13,000 koku	
4	Hotta Masakuni (堀田正邦)	1753–1772	Dewa-no-kami (出羽守)	Junior 5th Rank, Lower Grade (従五位下)	13,000 koku
5	Hotta Masazane (堀田正穀)	1772–1815	Buzen-no-kami (豊前守)	Junior 5th Rank, Lower Grade (従五位下)	13,000 koku
6	Hotta Masatami (堀田正民)	1815–1838	Kaga-no-kami (加賀守)	Junior 5th Rank, Lower Grade (従五位下)	13,000 koku
7	Hotta Masayoshi (堀田正義)	1838–1851	Buzen-no-kami (豊前守)	Junior 5th Rank, Lower Grade (従五位下)	13,000 koku
8	Hotta Masami (堀田正誠)	1851–1863	Kaga-no-kami (加賀守)	Junior 5th Rank, Lower Grade (従五位下)	13,000 koku
9	Hotta Masayasu (堀田正養)	1863–1871	Buzen-no-kami (豊前守)	Junior 3rd Rank, (従三位)	13,000 koku

== See also ==
- List of Han
