= Sano Domain =

Feudal domain of Edo Japan

Sano Domain 佐野藩
- under Tokugawa shogunate Japan
- 1600–1871
- Capital: Sano Castle→Sano jin'ya
  - Type: Daimyō
- Historical era: Edo period
  - Established: 1600
  - Disestablished: 1871
- Today part of: part of Tochigi Prefecture

Sano Domain (佐野藩, Sano-han) was a feudal domain under the Tokugawa shogunate of Edo period Japan, located in Shimotsuke Province (modern-day Tochigi Prefecture), Japan. It was centered in what is now part of the city of Sano, Tochigi. Sano was ruled through most of its history by a junior branch of the Hotta clan.

== History ==
The Sano clan was a branch of the Oyama clan, who settled in Sano shōen during the Kamakura period, and who ruled the area over 15 generations from their impregnable mountain stronghold of Karasawayama Castle. The area was contested during the Sengoku period between the forces of the Uesugi clan and the Odawara Hōjō clan, and Karasawayama Castle withstood ten attempts to conquer it by the famed warlord Uesugi Kenshin. The 17th generation head of the Sano clan, Sano Munetsuna was defeated by Nagao Akinaga, but the Sano territories were restored by Toyotomi Hideyoshi in recognition of their efforts at the 1590 Battle of Odawara.

After Tokugawa Ieyasu took control over the Kantō region in 1592, he confirmed Sano Nobuyoshi as daimyō of a 35,000 koku holding. This was the start of Sano Domain. However, the Sano clan was dispossessed of their holdings in 1614 for reasons which are still unclear.

During the time of Shōgun Tokugawa Ietsuna, Sano Domain was revived as a 10,000 koku subsidiary holding of Sakura Domain for Hotta Masataka, the third son of the Tairō Hotta Masatoshi. The Hotta built a modest jin'ya from which to rule the domain in line with its minor status. However, when Hotta Masataka was relocated to Katada Domain in Omi Province in 1698, the domain lapsed back to tenryō status. The 4th generation descendant of Hotta Masatoshi, Hotta Masaatsu, relocated from Katada back to Sano in 1826, where his descendants continued to reside to the end of the Tokugawa shogunate. The domain was quick to support the pro-imperial cause in the Boshin war of the Meiji restoration.

After the abolition of the han system in July 1871, Sano Domain became part of Tochigi Prefecture.

The domain had a population of 11,893 people in 2516 households, of which 1101 were samurai in 230 households per a census in 1870.

== Holdings at the end of the Edo period ==
As with most domains in the han system, Sano Domain consisted of several discontinuous territories calculated to provide the assigned kokudaka, based on periodic cadastral surveys and projected agricultural yields. Due to its history, the majority of its territory was in Omi Province.

- Shimotsuke Province
  - 3 villages in Aso District
- Kozuke Province
  - 6 villages in Seta District
  - 4 villages in Midono District
  - 1 village in Nitta District
  - 1 village in Yamada District
- Omi Province
  - 20 villages in Shiga District

== List of daimyō ==
#	Name	Tenure	Courtesy title	Court Rank	kokudaka
Sano clan (tozama) 1600–1613
1	Sano Nobuyoshi (佐野 信吉)	1600–1613	Shuri-daibu (修理大夫)	Lower 5th (従五位下)	39,000 koku
tenryō 1613–1698
Hotta clan (fudai) 1684–1684
1	Hotta Masataka (堀田 正高)	1684–1608	Bungo-no-kami (備後守)	Lower 5th (従五位下)	10,000 koku
tenryō 1698–1826
Hotta clan (fudai) 1826–1871
1	Hotta Masaatsu (堀田正敦)	1826–1832	Settsu-no-kami (摂津守)	Lower 5th (従五位下)	13,000 ->16,000 koku
2	Hotta Masahira (堀田 正衡)	1832–1854	Settsu-no-kami(摂津守)	Lower 5th (従五 位下)	16, 000 koku
3	Hotta Masatsugu (堀田 正頌)	1832–1688	Shinano-no-kami(信濃守)	Lower 5th (従五 位下)	16,000 koku
