= Hotta Masayasu =

Hotta Masayasu may refer to:

- Hotta Masayasu (1655-1731), daimyō of Ōmi-Miyagawa Domain 1698-1715
- Hotta Masayasu (Viscount), daimyō of Ōmi-Miyagawa Domain 1863-1871; subsequently Minister of Communications in 1908

== See also ==
- Hotta clan
