= Chaa =

Chaa may refer to:

== People ==
- Lady Chaa

== Places ==
- Chaa Creek, Belize
- Chaa-Khol, Russia

== Other ==
- CHAA-FM, Canadian radio station
