= Megohime =

Japanese noblewoman (1568–1653)

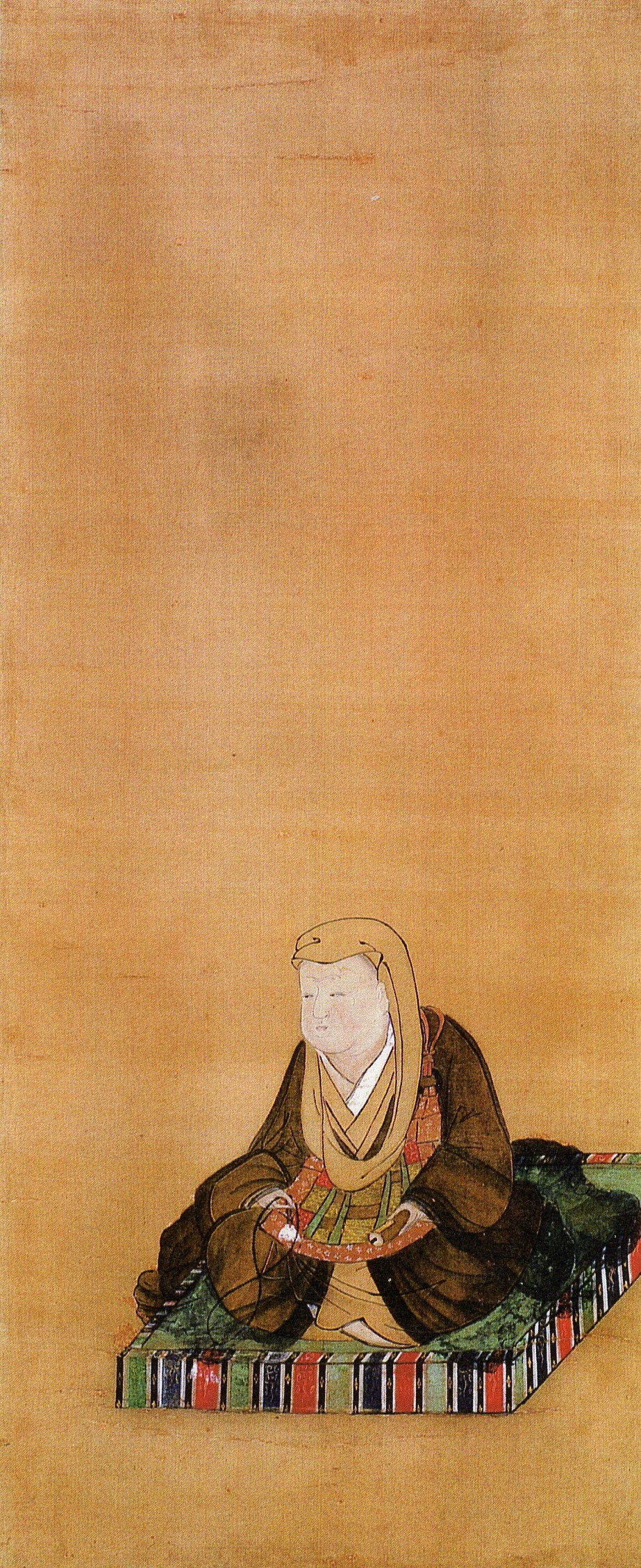
- Born: 1568
- Died: February 21, 1653 (aged 84–85)
- Other names: Yoshihime; Lady Tamura (田村御前); Yōtokuin (陽徳院)
- Spouse: Date Masamune
- Children: Irohahime; Date Tadamune; Date Munetsuna; Date Takematsumaru
- Parent(s): Tamura Kiyoaki; Okita
- Family: Tamura clan Date clan

Megohime, or Yoshihime (愛姫; 1568 – February 21, 1653) was a Japanese noble lady and aristocrat from the Azuchi–Momoyama period to the early Edo period. She is the daughter and only child of Tamura Kiyoaki, the lord of Miharu Castle, and Okita, daughter of Sōma Akitane. She was also the wife of Date Masamune. She was also known as Lady Tamura (田村御前). After fulfilling her pravrajya, her posthumous Buddhist name was Yōtokuin (陽徳院).

== Life ==
In 1579, she married her second cousin Masamune at the age of twelve. Her wet nurse was killed by Masamune, who suspected that betrayers from the Tamura clan were involved in the assassination attempt on him. It is said that her marriage got worse for a while because many other handmaidens serving her were executed.

However, after she moved to the Date residence in Jurakudai in Kyoto, her marriage seemed to be restored and she gave birth to Irohahime (Matsudaira Tadateru's wife) in 1594. From there, she had four children with Masamune, including Irohahime, Date Tadamune (the second lord of the Sendai Domain), Munetsuna Date, and Takematsumaru Date.

Even after she lived in the Date residence in Jurakudai, she might have played a role of a woman diplomat to inform Masamune of the Kyoto situation. In a letter addressed to him, she wrote:

"The world has not been stabilized yet. You should decide your course of action in accordance with the cause of the universe. Don't worry about me. I always have a knife with me. I'll promise not to be shamed."

When Masamune died on June 27, 1636, she entered the Buddhist priesthood under the Ungo Zenji and called herself Yōtokuin.

Megohime died on February 21, 1653, at the age of 86. It was the same day as the mensiversary of Masamune's death. Her graveyard is located in the Yotokuin mausoleum near the Zuigan-ji Temple.

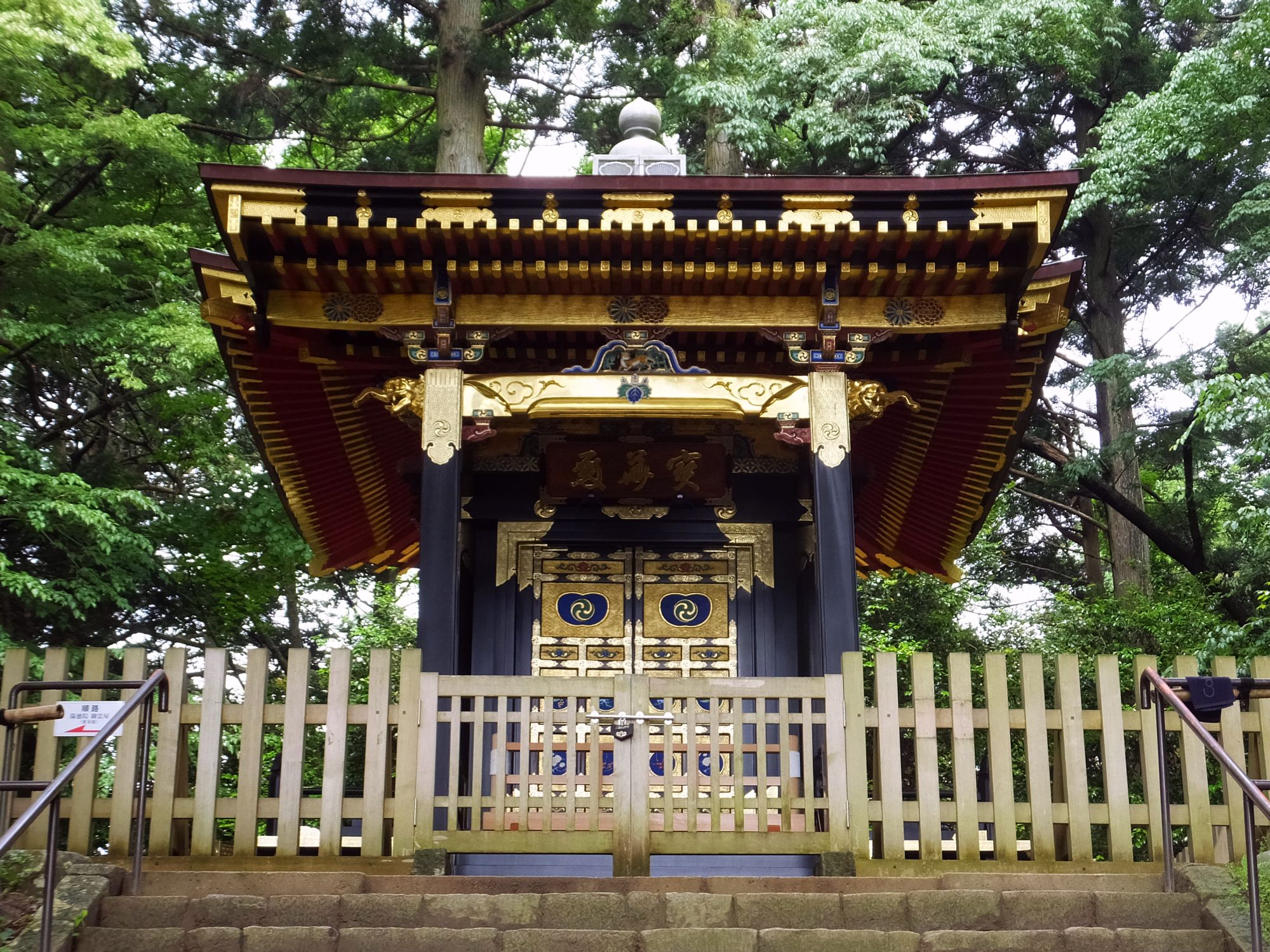
Yōtoku-in Tamaya (Mausoleum of Megohime) in Matsushima, Miyagi

== Last Testament ==
She frequently asked Masamune and Tadamune to restore the Tamura family.

Tadamune obeyed his mother's will and rebuilt the Tamura family with his son, Muneyoshi, as the lord the same year as his mother's death.

== In popular culture ==
- In the NHK taiga drama Dokuganryū Masamune, she is portrayed by Junko Sakurada, and her younger incarnation by Kumiko Goto.
- In the NHK taiga drama Tenchijin, she is portrayed by Anne Watanabe (credited as Anne).
- In the ongoing anime series Masamune Datenicle, produced in coordination between Gaina and Date City, Fukushima, Megohime is portrayed as a 14-year-old girl.
