= Masayasu =

Masayasu is both a given name and a surname. Notable people with the name include:

- Hotta Masayasu (1848–1911), Japanese politician
- Inaba Masayasu (1640–1684), Japanese feudal lord
- Masayasu Wakabayashi (born 1978), Japanese comedian, television presenter, and actor
- Masayasu Nomura (1927-2011), Japanese molecular biologist
- Sogō Masayasu (1562-1587), Japanese samurai
