= Jindai-ji =

Jindai-ji may refer to:

- Jindai-ji (Chiba), a temple in Chiba, Japan
- Jindai-ji (Tokyo), a temple in Chōfu, Tokyo, Japan
