= Matsudaira Matsuchiyo =

Matsudaira Matsuchiyo (松平 松千代; 1 January 1594 – 7 February 1599) was the seventh son of Tokugawa Ieyasu with his concubine, Lady Chaa. He was born in Jurakudai, later he was granted Fukaya Domain by his father. After his death, he was succeeded by his sixth brother, Matsudaira Tadateru. His Buddhist name was Eisho-in (栄昌院).

Preceded by Matsudaira Yasunao	Lord of Fukaya; 1594-1599	Succeeded by Matsudaira Tadateru
