= Jindai-ji (Chiba) =

Buddhist temple in Chiba Prefecture, Japan

Coordinates: 35°43′18.4″N 140°17′03.71″E

Jindai-ji (Sakura, Chiba) 甚大寺
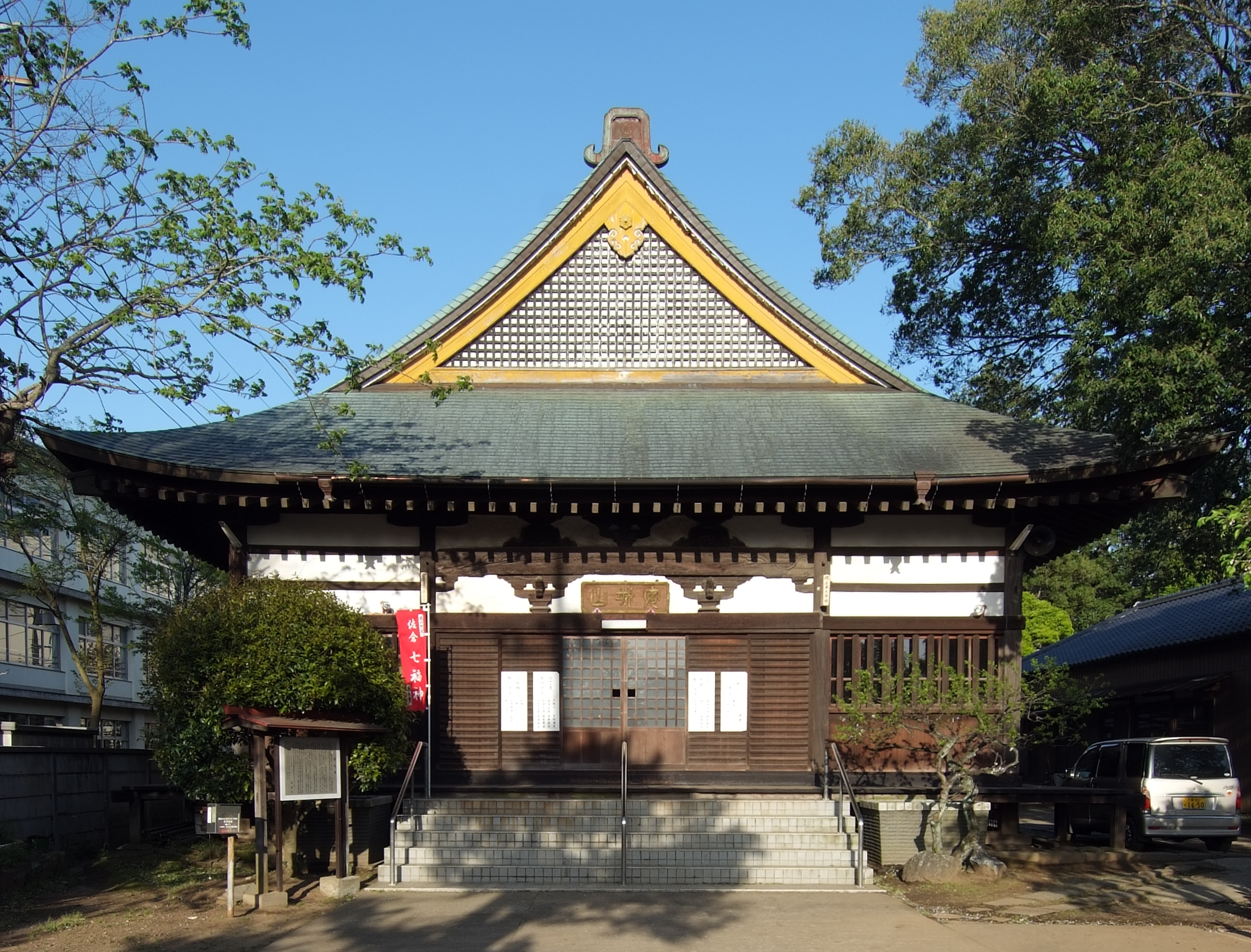
- The Hon-dō, or Main Hall

Religion
- Affiliation: Tendai
- Deity: Eleven-Faced Kannon

Location
- Location: 78-1 Shinmachi, Sakura, Chiba Prefecture
- Country: Japan
- Interactive map of Jindai-ji (Sakura, Chiba) 甚大寺

Jindai-ji (甚大寺) is a Buddhist temple located in the city of Sakura in Chiba Prefecture, Japan. The temple was originally located in Yamagata Prefecture, but when the Hotta clan was granted control of the Sakura Domain, Hotta Masasuke moved the temple in 1746 to serve as the clan's funerary temple (菩提寺, bodaiji), or family temple. The Hotta clan's historical grave marker is located at Jindai-ji, as are the tombstones of Hotta Masatoshi, Hotta Masayoshi, and Hotta Masatomo, all of which are designated as Chiba Prefectural Historical Places. The bronze statue of the Eleven-Faced Kannon, the primary object of veneration at Jindai-ji, is by the artist Tsuda Shinobu (1875-1946).

== Sources ==
- Chiba-ken Kōtō Gakkō Kyōiku Kenkyūkai. Rekishi Bukai. (1989). Chiba-ken no rekishi sanpo (千葉県の歴史散步 "A Walk in Chiba Prefecture's History"). Tokyo: Yamakawa Shuppansha. ISBN 978-4-634-29120-1.
