= Masatsugu =

- Gender: Male

Origin
- Origin: Japanese
- Meaning: Different meanings depending on the kanji used

Masatsugu (written: 正次, 正継, 正嗣, 正頌, 昌次, 雅継, 将嗣, 政嗣, 将次 and 政次) is a masculine Japanese given name. Notable people with the name include:

- Abe Masatsugu (阿部 正次; 1569–1647), Japanese daimyō
- Hajikano Masatsugu (初鹿野 昌次; 1545–1624), Japanese samurai
- Heki Danjō Masatsugu (日置 弾正 政次; 1443–1502), Japanese warrior
- Hotta Masatsugu (堀田 正頌; 1842–1896), Japanese daimyō
- Ishida Masatsugu (石田 正継; died 1600), Japanese samurai
- Masatsugu Kawachi (川内 将嗣; born 1985), Japanese boxer
- Masatsugu Morofuji (諸藤 将次; born 1985), Japanese golfer
- Nijō Masatsugu (二条 政嗣; 1443–1480), Japanese noble
- Masatsugu Ono (小野 正嗣; born 1970), Japanese writer
- Masatsugu Suzuki, Japanese-American physicist
- Tsuchiya Masatsugu (土屋 昌次; 1544–1575), Japanese samurai
- Yoshikaze Masatsugu (嘉風 雅継; born 1982), Japanese sumo wrestler
