= Kawagoe Domain =

Kawagoe Domain 川越藩
- under Tokugawa shogunate Japan
- 1590–1871
- Capital: Kawagoe Castle
  - Type: Daimyō
- Historical era: Edo period
  - Established: 1590
  - Disestablished: 1871
- Today part of: part of Saitama Prefecture

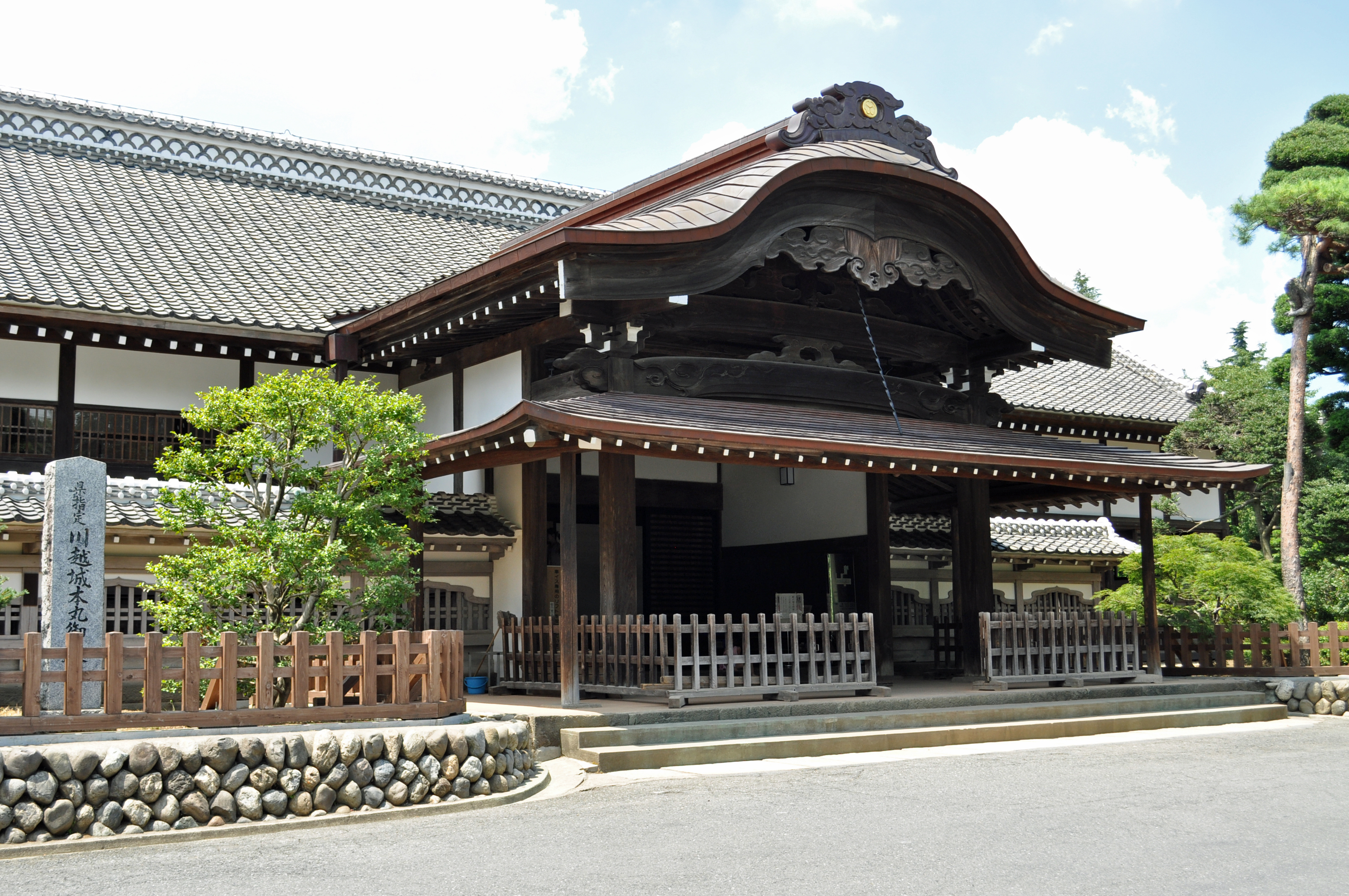
Kawagoe Castle daimyō residence, administrative headquarters of Kawagoe Domain

Kawagoe Domain (川越藩, Kawagoe-han) was a feudal domain under the Tokugawa shogunate of Edo period Japan. It is located in Musashi Province, Honshū. The domain was centered at Kawagoe Castle, located in what is the city of Kawagoe in Saitama Prefecture.

== History ==
The domain had its beginning in 1590, when Toyotomi Hideyoshi defeated the later Hōjō clan in the Siege of Odawara. Hideyoshi awarded vast Hōjō holdings to Tokugawa Ieyasu, who enfeoffed Sakai Shigetada as daimyō of Kawagoe with a assessed kokudaka of 10,000 koku. Shigetada was transferred in 1601, and the next daimyō was appointed in 1609.

Afterwards, the domain was reassigned every couple of generations to a large number of fudai daimyō clans, spending the longest time under the control of a branch of the Echizen Matsudaira clan (1767–1867) with a rating of 170,000 koku.

The final daimyō of Kawagoe, Matsudaira Yasutoshi, served as domain governor until 1871, and was awarded the title of shishaku (viscount) under the kazoku peerage system. Kawagoe Domain subsequently became part of Saitama Prefecture.

== Bakumatsu period holdings ==
As with most domains in the han system, Kawagoe Domain consisted of several discontinuous territories calculated to provide the assigned kokudaka, based on periodic cadastral surveys and projected agricultural yields.

- Musashi Province
  - 1 village in Hiki District
  - 104 villages in Iruma District
  - 2 villages in Hanzawa District
  - 1 village in Chichibu District
- Hitachi Province
  - 27 villages in Taga District
- Mikawa Province
  - 1 village in Hazu District
- Ōmi Province
  - 5 villages in Yasu District
  - 12 villages in Kōka District
  - 33 villages in Gamō District
  - 8 villages in Takashima District

== List of daimyōs ==
#	Name	Tenure	Courtesy title	Court Rank	kokudaka	Notes
Sakai clan (fudai) 1590–1601
1	Sakai Shigetada (酒井重忠)	1590–1601	Kawachi-no-kami (河内守)	Lower 5th (従五位下)	10,000 koku	transfer to Maebashi Domain
Sakai clan (fudai) 1609–1634
1	Sakai Tadatoshi (酒井忠利)	1609–1627	Bungo-no-kami (備後守)	Lower 5th (従五位下)	20,000 → 37,000 koku	transfer from Tanaka Domain
2	Sakai Tadakatsu (酒井忠勝)	1627–1634	Sasho-sho (左少将)	Lower 4th (従四位下)	80,000 → 100,000 koku	transfer to Obama Domain
Hotta clan (fudai) 1635–1638
1	Hotta Masamori (堀田正俊)	1635–1638	Kaga-no-kami (加賀守)	Lower 4th (従四位下)	35,000 koku	transfer to Matsumoto Domain
Matsudaira (Nagasawa-Ōkōchi) clan (fudai) 1639–1694
1	Matsudaira Nobutsuna (松平信綱)	1639–1662	Izu-no-kami (伊豆守)	Lower 4th (従四位下)	70,000 koku	from Oshi Domain
2	Matsudaira Terutsuna (松平輝綱)	1662–1672	Kai-no-kami (甲斐守)	Lower 5th (従五位下)	70,000 koku	
3	Matsudaira Nobuteru (松平信輝)	1672–1694	Izu-no-kami (伊豆守)	Lower 5th (従五位下)	70,000 koku	transfer to Koga Domain
Yanagisawa clan (fudai) 1694–1704
1	Yanagisawa Yoshiyasu (松平康長)	1694-1704	Mino-no-kami (美濃守); Jijū (侍従)	Lower 4th (従四位下)	72,000->112,000 koku	
Akimoto clan (fudai) 1704–1767
1	Akimoto Takatomo (秋元喬知)	1704–1714	Tajima-no-kami (但馬守)	Lower 4th (従四位下)	50,000 → 60,000 koku	transfer from Tanimura Domain
2	Akimoto Takafusa (秋元喬房)	1714–1737	Tajima-no-kami (但馬守)	Lower 4th (従四位下)	60,000 koku	
3	Akimoto Takamoto (秋元喬求)	1738–1742	Etchu-no-kami (越中守)	Lower 5th (従五位下)		
4	Akimoto Takatomo (秋元凉朝)	1742–1767	Tajima-no-kami (但馬守)	Lower 4th (従四位下)	60,000 koku	transfer to Yamagata Domain
Matsudaira (Echizen) clan (fudai) 1767–1867
1	Matsudaira Motonori (松平朝矩)	1767–1768	Yamato-no-kami (大和守); Jijū (侍従)	Lower 4th (従四位下)	150,000 koku	transfer from Maebashi Domain
2	Matsudaira Naotsuna (松平直恒)	1768–1810	Yamato-no-kami (大和守); Jijū (侍従)	Lower 4th (従四位下)	150,000 koku	
3	Matsudaira Naonobu (松平直温)	1810–1816	Yamato-no-kami (大和守); Jijū (侍従)	Lower 4th (従四位下)	150,000 koku	
4	Matsudaira Naritsune (松平斉典)	1816–1850	Sakon-no-shosho (左近衛少将); Jijū (侍従)	Upper 4th (従四位上)	150,000 → 170,000 koku	
5	Matsudaira Tsunenori (松平典則)	1850–1854	Yamato-no-kami (大和守)	Lower 5th (従五位下)	170,000 koku	
6	Matsudaira Naoyoshi (松平直侯)	1855–1861	Yamato-no-kami (大和守); Jijū (侍従)	Lower 5th (従五位下)	170,000 koku	
7	Matsudaira Naokatsu (松平直克)	1861–1867	Sakon-no-shosho (左近衛少将); Jijū (侍従)	Upper 4th (従四位上)	170,000 koku	
Matsudaira (Matsui) clan (fudai) 1861–1871
1	Matsudaira Yasuhide (松平康英)	1866–1869	Suo-no-kami (周防守); Jiju (侍従)	Lower 5th (従五位下)	84,000 koku	from Tanakura Domain
2	Matsudaira Yasutoshi (松平康載)	1869–1871	Suo-no-kami (周防守)	Lower 5th (従五位下)	84,000 koku	domainal governor

== See also ==
List of Han
