= Chaa-Kholsky District =

Chaa-Kholsky District Чаа-Хольский кожуун (Russian)
- District

Other transcription(s)
  - Tuvan: Чаа-Хөл кожуун
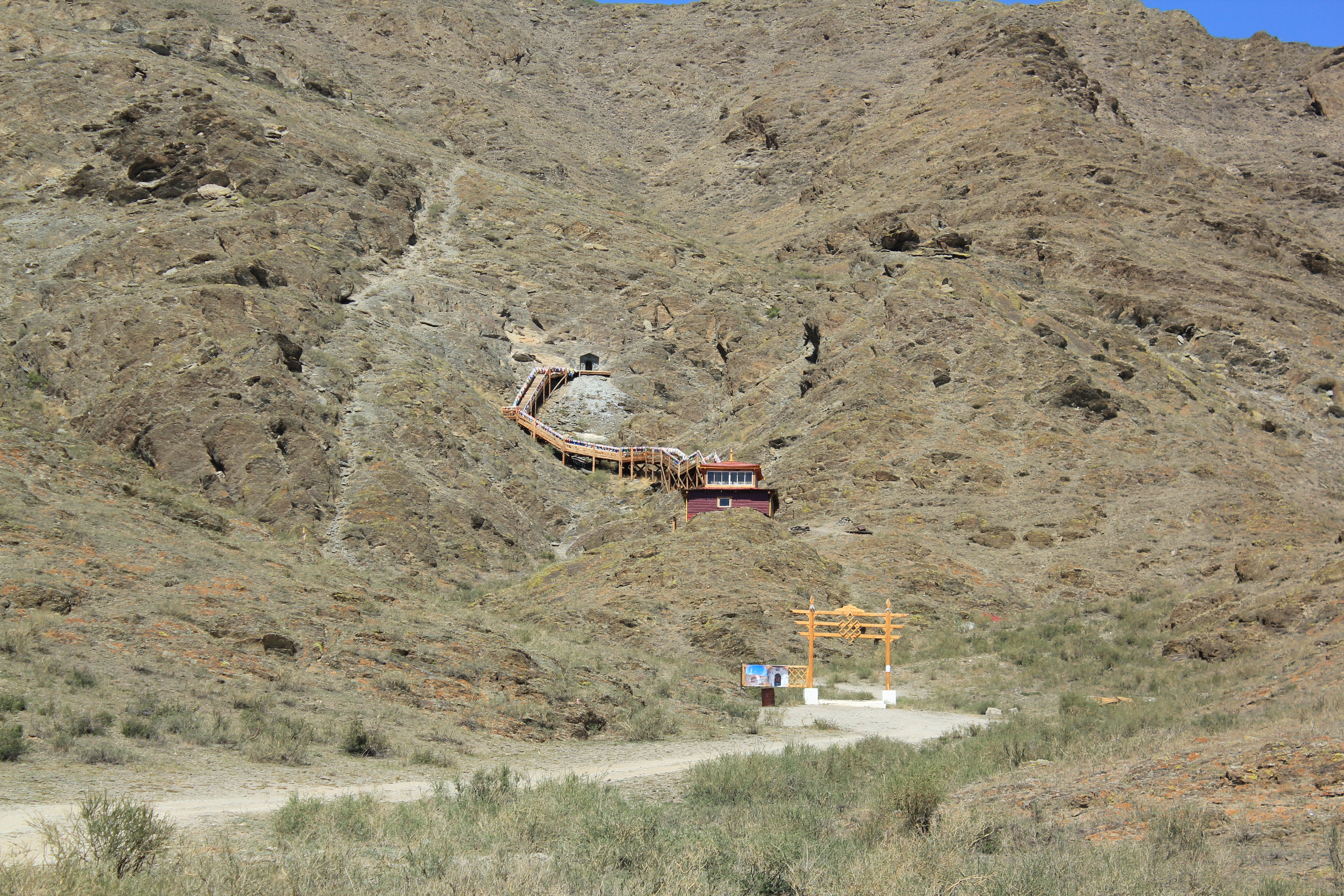
- Copy of Buddhist niche, Chaa-Kholsky District

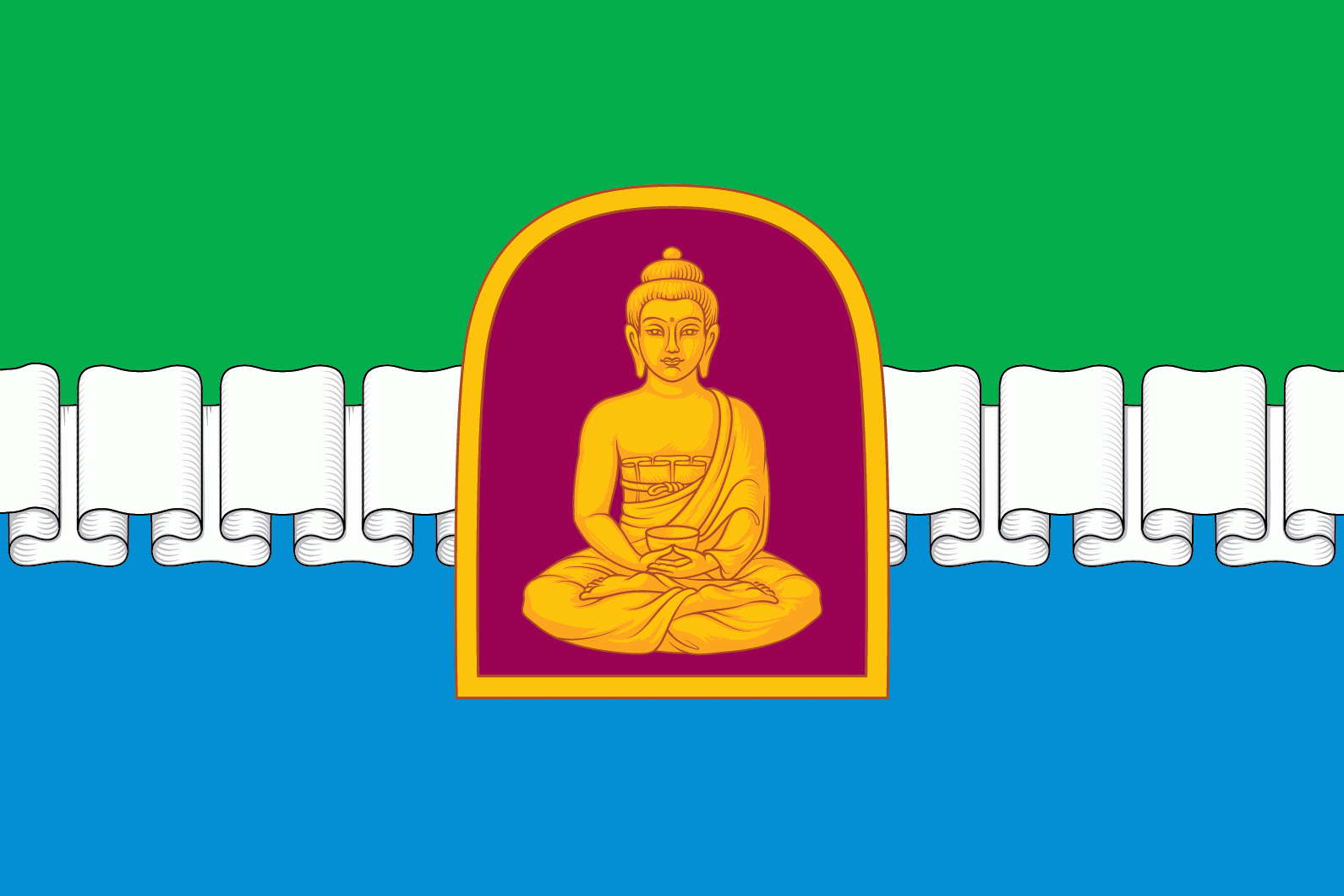
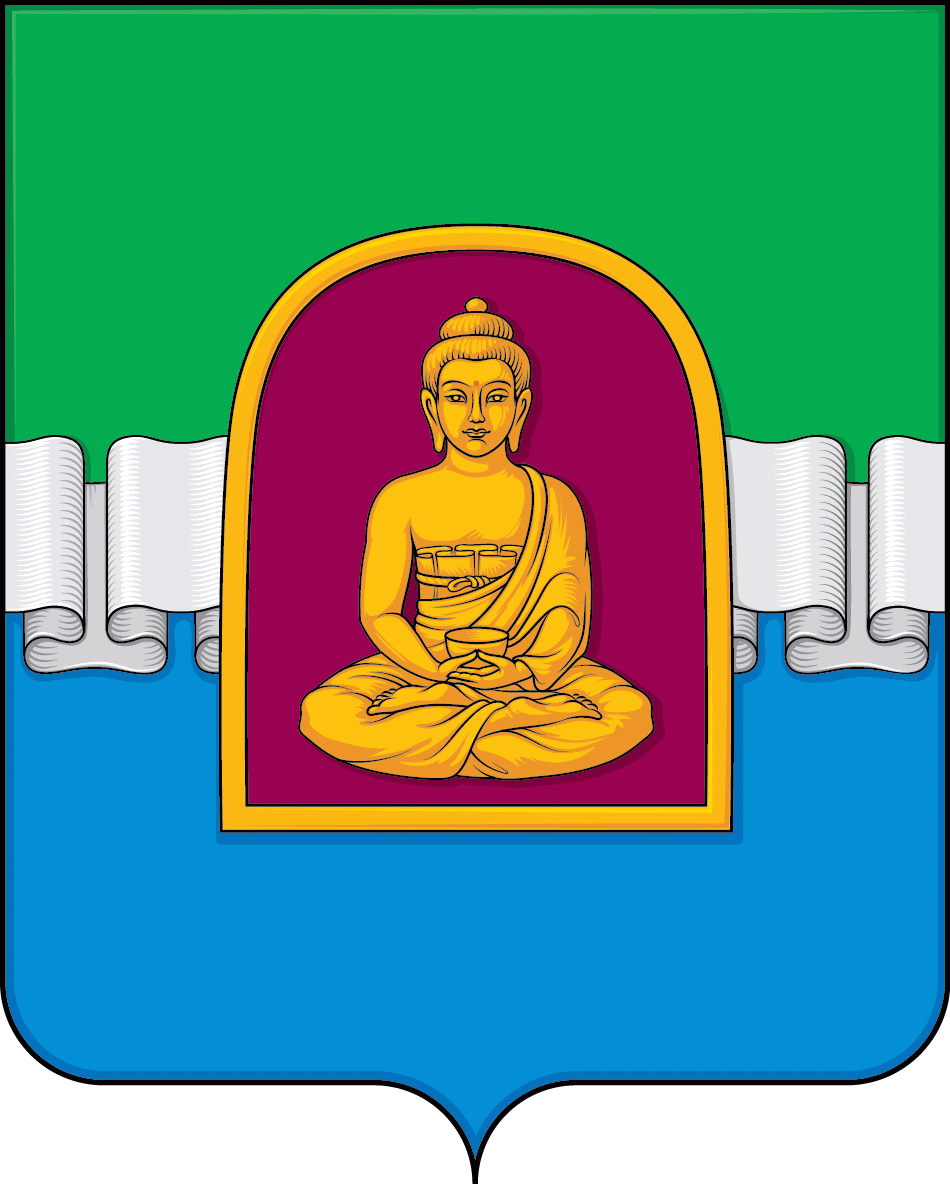
- Flag Coat of arms
- Location of Chaa-Kholsky District in the Tuva Republic
- Coordinates: 51.537°N 92.222°E
- Country: Russia
- Federal subject: Tuva Republic
- Established: 1941 (first), 1992 (second)
- Administrative center: Chaa-Khol

Area
  - Total: 2,900 km^{2} (1,100 sq mi)

Population (2010 Census)
  - Total: 6,036
  - Density: 2.1/km^{2} (5.4/sq mi)
  - Urban: 0%
  - Rural: 100%

Administrative structure
  - Administrative divisions: 4 sumon
  - Inhabited localities: 4 rural localities

Municipal structure
  - Municipally incorporated as: Chaa-Kholsky Municipal District
  - Municipal divisions: 0 urban settlements, 4 rural settlements
- Time zone: UTC+7 (MSK+4)
- OKTMO ID: 93656000
- Website: http://gov.tuva.ru/region/msu/779/

Chaa-Kholsky District (Russian: Чаа-Хольский кожуун; Tuvan: Чаа-Хөл кожуун, Çaa-Xöl kojuun) is an administrative and municipal district (raion, or kozhuun), one of the seventeen in the Tuva Republic, Russia. It is located in the west of the republic. The area of the district is 2,900 square kilometers (1,100 sq mi). Its administrative center is the rural locality (a selo) of Chaa-Khol. Population: 6,036 (2010 census); 6,532 (2002 Census). The population of Chaa-Khol accounts for 53.8% of the district's total population.

== History ==
Chaa-Kholsky District was established in 1941. In 1961, the district was abolished and merged with Ulug-Khemsky District. Chaa-Kholsky District was restored in 1992.
