= Sano Castle =

Coordinates: 36.3191°N 139.5791°E

- 佐野城
- Sano, Tochigi Prefecture, Japan
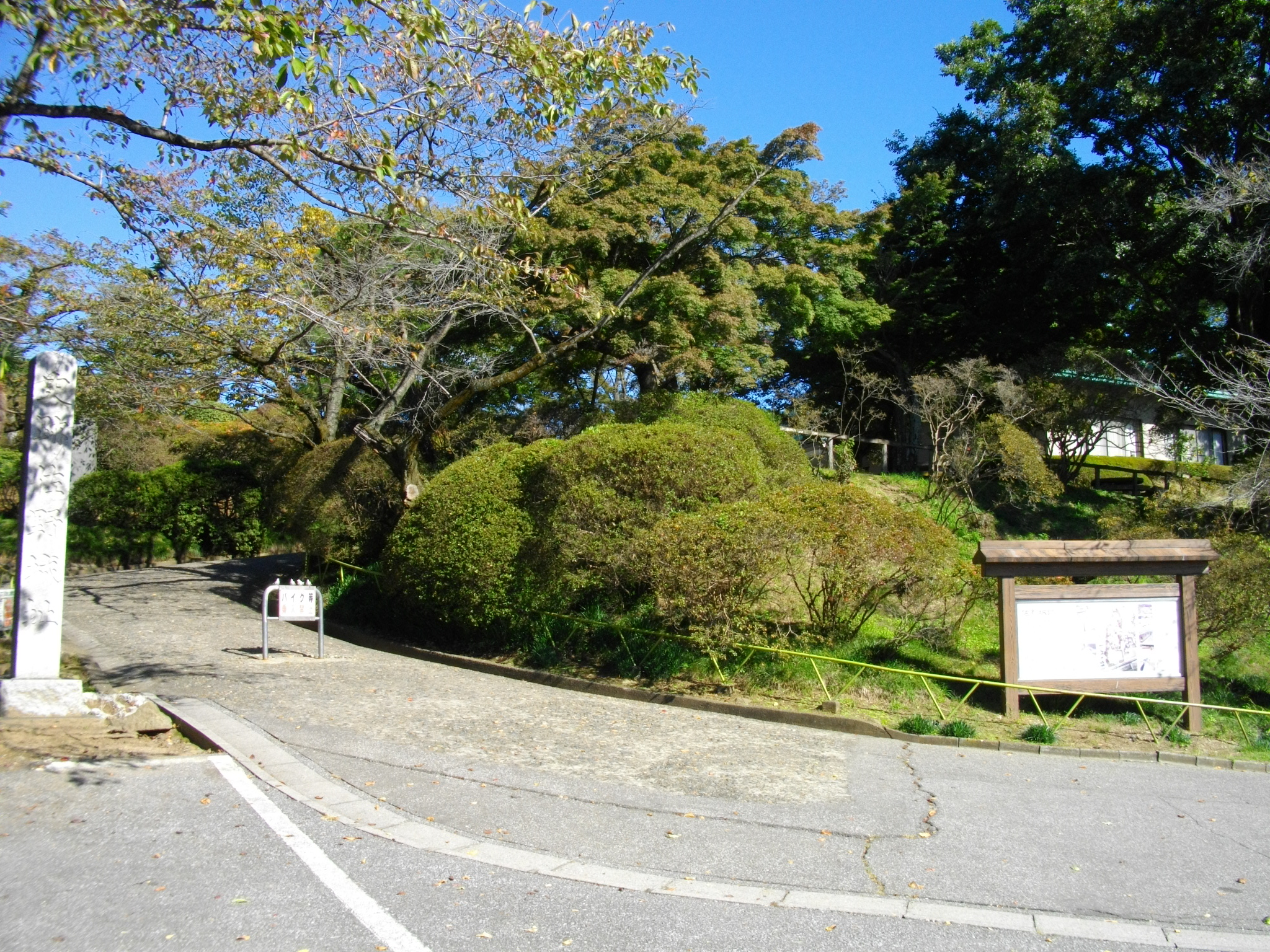
- Sano Castle Park

Site information
- Type: Hirayama-style castle
- Owner: Sano clan
- Condition: ruins

Location

Site history
- Built: 1602
- Built by: Sano Nobuyoshi
- Demolished: 1614

Little is known of Sano Castle (佐野城, Sano-jō). It is mostly connected to its nearby castle, Karasawa Castle, both of which were next to Sano, the corresponding castle town for the two castles during the Edo period. The Sano Clan had previously built Karasawayama Castle, which had been established since the 1400s. In 1602, there was a great fire in Edo castle, which could be seen from Karasawayama Castle. The Sano clan sent their condolences to the Emperor. Some historians say that when the Emperor realised that Karasawayama Castle looked down on Edo, he told the Sano clan that there was a law against this. In the same year of the fire, 1602, the Sano clan, rebuilt another new castle at a lower point on the hill - this castle was named Sano Castle.

Sano Castle itself only existed for a short period of time, and was a less substantial castle than its predecessor. It was built in 1602. However, after the clan moved there from their old castle, the clan became involved in the political conflict of the Shogunate and were expelled, like many other non hereditary lords in Kantō region (e.g. the Satomi clan and Minagawa clans). As a result of this, their lands were seized and they were forced to abandon it in 1614.

It was unoccupied after that, and fell into ruin.

== Present site ==
There is little on the present site except for three baileys, indicating the footprint of the castle.
