= Sakai Tadatoshi =

Edo period Japanese samurai daimyō

Sakai Tadatoshi (酒井 忠利; 1562–1627) was a Japanese samurai daimyō of the Edo period. He was head of a cadet branch of the Sakai clan.

== Career ==
In 1601, Tadatoshi was made head of Tanaka Domain (10,000 koku) in Suruga Province. His holdings were transferred in 1609 to Kawagoe Domain (30,000 koku) in Musashi Province.

Preceded by ______	Daimyō of Tanaka; 1601–1609	Succeeded by ______
Preceded by ______	Daimyō of Kawagoe; 1609–1627	Succeeded by Sakai Tadakatsu
