= Keifukuin Kaoku Gyokuei =

Japanese poet and writer

- 慶福院花屋玉栄
- Born: 1526
- Died: after 1602
- Occupations: Poet, writer
- Relatives: Konoe Taneie (father), Lady Chaa (niece)
- Writing career
- Period: Muromachi period
- Notable works: Kaokushō, Gyokueishū

Keifukuin Kaoku Gyokuei (慶福院花屋玉栄; 1526 – after 1602) was a Japanese writer, poet, and commentator during the Sengoku period. She is best known for Kaokushō and Gyokueishū, her commentaries on the Tale of Genji. She was the daughter of Konoe Taneie, a nobleman and poet.

== Early life ==
Gyokuei was born in 1526, a daughter of Konoe Taneie. The Konoe family trafficked in manuscripts and her father was known to host renga parties. Because of the literary culture of her family, she was likely exposed to such works as the Tale of Genji. It is uncertain whether she was the daughter of Konoe Taneie who was married to the shogun Ashikaga Yoshiteru in 1558.

== Works ==
Gyokuei authored four main works in her lifetime:

- An emaki of the Tale of Genji (1554)
- A collection of 54 poems inspired by the chapters of the Tale of Genji (1589)
- Kaokushō, a four-volume commentary on the Tale of Genji (1594)
- Gyokueishū, a one-volume commentary on the Tale of Genji (1602)

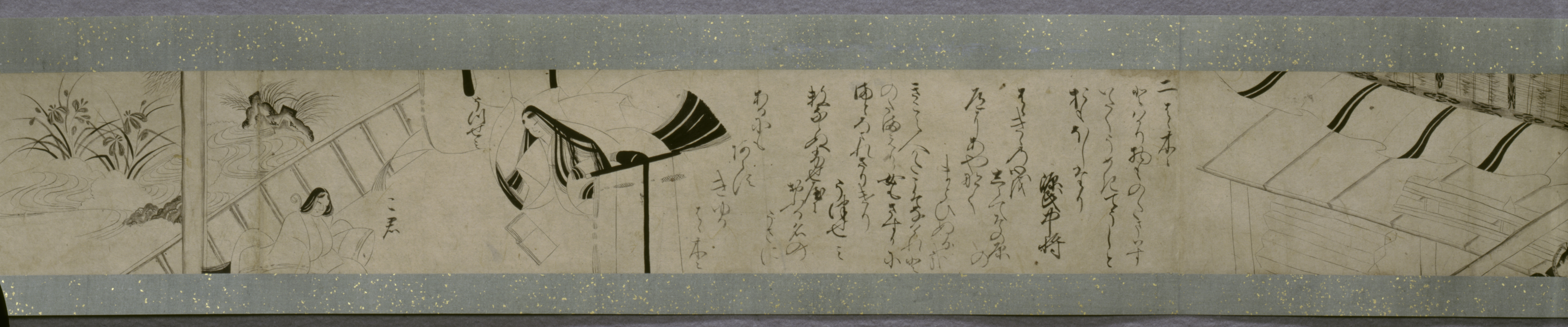
A hakubyō Genji monogatari emaki, believed to have been created by Gyokuei

Her commentaries on the Tale of Genji, which were aimed at fellow aristocratic women, differed from her contemporaries by telling readers to read Genji for pleasure. She also does not rely on quotations from Chinese classics, and writes mainly in hiragana (as opposed to kanji), suggesting that she wanted her work to be accessible to female readers. She wrote a "short text", Genji monogatari no okori, which she gave to her niece, Lady Chaa. This same text was also copied by Toyotomi Hideyoshi while he was studying the Tale of Genji.

Her commentaries on the Tale of Genji were read by many other aristocratic women and remained in circulation as manuscripts until the 20th century.
