= Sakai Tadakatsu =

Japanese daimyō (1587–1662)

- 酒井 忠勝
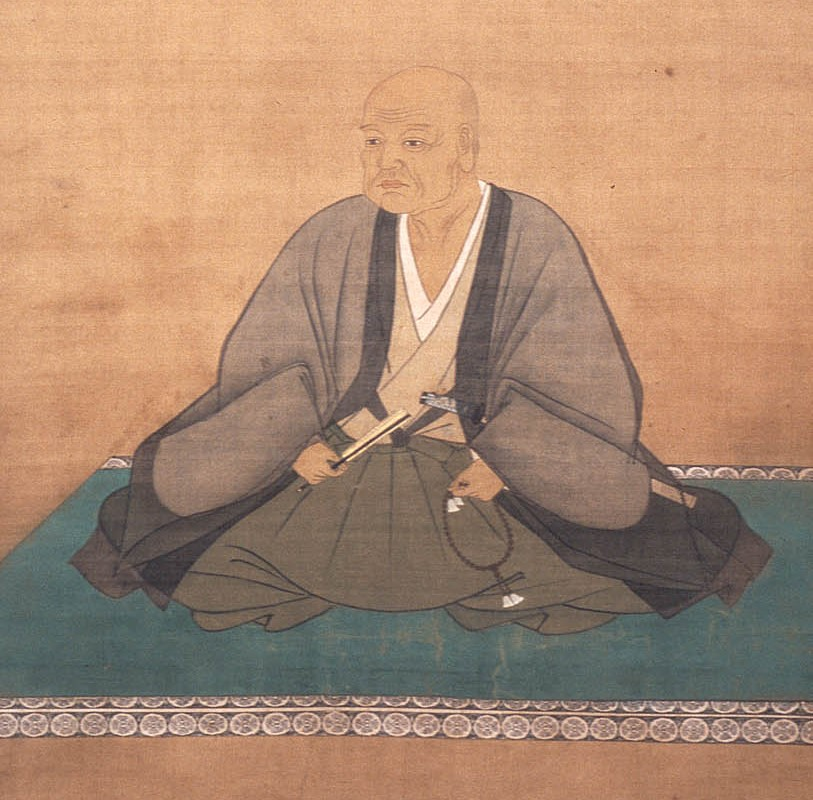

Daimyō of Fukaya Domain
- In office 1626–1627
- Preceded by: Matsudaira Tadateru

Daimyō of Kawagoe Domain
- In office 1627–1634
- Preceded by: Sakai Tadatoshi
- Succeeded by: Hotta Masamori

Daimyō of Obama Domain
- In office 1634–1656
- Preceded by: Kyōgoku Tadataka
- Succeeded by: Sakai Tadanao

Personal details
- Born: July 21, 1587 Nishio, Mikawa, Japan
- Died: August 25, 1662 (aged 75) Obama, Wakasa, Japan
- Resting place: Obama, Japan
- Parent: Sakai Tadatoshi (father)

Sakai Tadakatsu (酒井 忠勝; July 21, 1587 – August 25, 1662) was a Sengoku period samurai, and early Edo period daimyō who served in several important positions within the administration of the Tokugawa shogunate.

== Biography ==
Tadakatsu was born in Nishio, Mikawa Province as the son of Sakai Tadatoshi, a hereditary retainer of Tokugawa Ieyasu and future daimyō of Kawagoe Domain. In 1591, he was awarded a 3000 koku fief in Shimōsa Province. In 1600, he was assigned to the train of Tokugawa Hidetada in the Battle of Sekigahara and participated in Hidetada's failed attempt to defeat the Sanada clan at the Siege of Ueda. He was awarded the court rank of Lower 5th, Junior Grade and the courtesy title of Sanuki-no-kami in 1607. In 1620, Shōgun Tokugawa Hidetada assigned Tadatoshi to the court of his son, Tokugawa Iemitsu and gained him additional estates with a kokudaka of 7,000 koku in Fukaya, Musashi Province in 1622. This enabled him to resurrect Fukaya Domain and to style himself as a daimyō.

In 1624, when Iemitsu became Shōgun, Tadakatsu was awarded with an additional 20,000 koku in holdings scattered throughout the provinces of Kazusa, Shimōsa and Musashi. The same year, together with Doi Toshikatsu, he was promoted to the office of rōjū.

On the death of his father, Sakai Tadatoshi in 1627, Tadakatsu inherited the Kawagoe Domain. He added an additional 20,000 koku to the domain's holdings in Musashi Province in 1632 and his court rank was increased to Lower 4th, Junior Grade, with the additional courtesy title of Jijū added to his honorifics. In 1634, he was transferred to Obama Domain, whose holdings covered all of Wakasa Province, with additional holdings in Echizen, Ōmi and Awa. This brought his total kokudaka to 123,500 koku.

In 1638 (together with Doi Toshikatsu), he retired from the post of rōjū, with permission to return for important issues. This dispensation later evolved into the official title of tairō.

In 1643, he was promoted to Upper 4th, Junior Grade court rank and added the courtesy title of Sakonoe-gon-shōshō.

Also in 1643, he was involved in the "Nanbu Incident", when ten sailors (including the captain) of the Dutch Ship Breskens were taken into custody by local Japanese officials. after the Breskens had sailed unannounced into the Bay of Yamada in Northern Honshu. The Dutch ship had visited the bay once before seeking to resupply after a heavy storm, and quickly left after trading with the locals for two days. However, when the Breskens returned in July the ship and its crew were seized by local authorities for its violation of Japan's national isolation policy. This sparked an international incident, and at the time the rōjū serving the shogunate were Sakai Tadakatsu, Matsudaira Nobutsuna, and Inoue Masashige. The Shogunal government went to great lengths to use the Nambu incident to pressure the Dutch into sending an embassy to Edo, by which it attempted to use the incident as means of securing domestic legitimacy. What was for the Dutch merely a cynical gesture aimed at preserving their trade relations with Japan was for the shogunate an opportunity to parade twenty-two Dutchmen in red and white striped uniforms through the streets of Edo, impressing upon a domestic audience the fiction that the shogunate's authority was recognized throughout the world.

In 1652, Tadatoshi sponsored the publication of the Nihon Ōdai Ichiran in Kyoto. This book was brought from Japan to Europe by Isaac Titsingh in 1796, who translated the text from Japanese and Chinese; and his work was then supplemented for posthumous publication by Julius Klaproth in 1834. In supporting this work, Tadakatsu's motivations appear to spread across a range anticipated consequences; and it becomes likely that his several intentions in seeing that this specific work fell into the hands of an empathetic Western translator were similarly multi-faceted.

In 1656, Sakai Tadatoshi retired from public life. He died in 1662 and his grave is at the clan temple of Kuin-ji in Obama.

The Lion dance (Shishi-mai) is a popular folk dance imported to Obama from Kawagoe by Sakai Tadakatsu. Three lions move to the accompaniment of music played on Japanese flutes. The traditional dance continues to be performed regularly during the Hoze Matsuri and the Osiro Matsuri.

Preceded by Matsudaira Tadateru	Daimyō of Fukaya; 1622–1627	Succeeded by none
Preceded by Sakai Tadatoshi	Daimyō of Kawagoe; 1627–1634	Succeeded by Hotta Masamori
Preceded by Kyōgoku Tadataka	Daimyō of Obama; 1634–1656	Succeeded by Sakai Tadanao
