= Lady Chaa =

Japanese noblewoman (1621–1642)

- 茶阿局

Personal life
- Born: c. 1550
- Died: July 30, 1621

Religious life
- Religion: Buddhism
- Dharma name: Satoru-in (朝覚院)

Military service
- Allegiance: Tokugawa clan

Lady Chaa (茶阿局, Chaa no Tsubone) (c. 1550 — July 30, 1621) was a Japanese noble woman and concubine of Tokugawa Ieyasu, the founder of the Tokugawa shogunate in Japan. She lived in Tōtōmi Province. She is said to be the daughter of a foundryman. When the daikan (a local official) had her husband killed, she appealed to Ieyasu, who was then the lord of Hamamatsu Castle; as a result, he punished the daikan. Lady Chaa subsequently became a concubine of Ieyasu. She was also the mother of Matsudaira Tadateru and Matsudaira Matsuchiyo. An account cited that Lady Chaa was part of Osaka Castle's Genji circle and received a copy of Genji monogatari no okori from her aunt, Keifukuin Kaoku Gyokuei.

Like other women of the Tokugawa clan, Lady Chaa was actively involved in politics, participating in councils and using her influence to protect and resolve conflicts between the temples. Lady Chaa's grave is at Sōkei-ji, a Buddhist temple in Bunkyō, Tokyo. Her Buddhist name is Satoru'in.

== Early life ==
Lady Chaa was the daughter of Yamada Hachizaemon of the Yamada clan, a local samurai family who governed the area around the village of Kanaya in Tōtōmi Province. There is a legend that, in her childhood, she learned calligraphy under the abbot of the Tōzen Temple and, in her later years, out of gratitude toward her master, she donated a bell to the temple. Prior to becoming a consort of Ieyasu, she married into and then separated from the Hanai clan whereupon she was adopted by the Kawamura, a more powerful samurai family.

After becoming the second wife of an individual engaged in metal casting, Lady Chaa bore a daughter named Oba. However, owing to her beauty, she became the target of a magistrate who turned into a homewrecker, killing her husband under darkness of night. As Lady Chaa took her three-year-old daughter (Oba) to seek revenge for the slaying, she encountered Ieyasu and his detail on a falconry outing, whereupon she appealed directly to Ieyasu for help. The magistrate was executed as punishment but then, in a manner similar to an abduction, Ieyasu took Lady Chaa and her daughter back to Hamamatsu Castle and had her serve as his consort, giving her the name of Chaa-no-tsubone. Meanwhile, Hasegawa Hachirōemon exacted revenge against the magistrate through execution.

== In Tokugawa clan ==
In 1592, Chaa-no-tsubone gave birth to Tatsuchiyo (later known as Matsudaira Tadateru) and, in 1594, to Matsuchiyo. However, Ieyasu did not treat Tatsuchiyo well. Soon after the birth of his younger brother, Matsuchiyo, Ieyasu arranged for Matsuchiyo to inherit the Nagasawa-Matsudaira family and made him the head of the Fukaya domain with a fief of 10,000 koku. In 1599, Matsuchiyo, however, died early at the age of six so Tatsuchiyo succeeded him as head of the domain. In 1602, Tatsuchiyo attended his coming-of-age ceremony and adopted the name of Tadateru. In 1603, the Fukaya domain was abolished and he was granted a fief of 140,000 koku in Kawanakajima in Shinano Province. Chaa-no-tsubone then arranged for the two sons (of a different mother) from her deceased husband (Zenhachirō and Matahachirō) to be adopted by Kimata Keihō, a member of the family of Hasegawa Hachirōemon and become servants of Tadateru. Meanwhile, her son-in-law, Hanai Yoshinari, became the chief retainer of Tadateru. Later, this invited conflict with long-serving retainers such as Matsudaira Kiyonao and Yamada Katsushige.

Owing to her intelligence and sensibility, Chaa-no-tsubone was delegated tasks in the inner part of Ieyasu’s residence. She was known for her strong opinion and political prowess. She endeavored to protect the temples in the environs of her hometown of Kanaya as well as to resolve disputes between the temples. Her younger brother remained busy serving as the abbot at the Nōman Temple and managing temple lands.

Her older brother, Yamada Kōzuke-no-suke, served Ishida Mitsunari and became a senior retainer. Just days after the Battle of Sekigahara, in 1600, Sawayama Castle was toppled. Kōzuke-no-suke, along with Mitsunari’s father (Ishida Masatsugu) and older brother (Ishida Masazumi), killed themselves. Before their demise, however, they enabled the escape of Kōzuke-no-suke’s son, Yamada Hayato-no-shō, to Chaa-no-tsubnoe through a relative named Kōzōsu. He later adopted the name of Yamada Katsushige and married the eldest daughter of Mitsunari. Meanwhile, Chaa-no-tsubone arranged for Katsushige to become the chief retainer of her son, Tadateru.

In 1606, Tadateru wed the eldest daughter (Irohahime) of Date Masamune as his formal wife. Thereafter, his fief steadily increased so that he controlled 750,000 koku in Takada in Echigo Province. In 1616, after the death of Ieyasu, Chaa-no-tsubone underwent the rites of tonsure and adopted the name of Satoru-in (朝覚院). However, soon thereafter, Tadateru was criticized by his older brother, Hidetada, on numerous occasions for mistakes, resulting in removal from his position and, as punishment, exile to Ise Province. Chaa-no-tsubone made every effort to obtain the assistance of a consort of Ieyasu named Acha-no-tsubone (Unkōin), but the help was not forthcoming. The diary of Captain Richard Cocks, the head of the England Chamber of Commerce in Hirado, notes that, following removal from his position, Tadateru stayed at the home of his uncle in Kanaya on his way to exile in Ise Province.

Chaa-no-tsubone died of illness in the sixth month of 1621 and was interred at the Sōkei Temple in Edo.

== Family ==
- Husband: Tokugawa Ieyasu
- Sons:
  - Matsudaira Tadateru
  - Matsudaira Matsuchiyo
