= Karasawa Castle =

Japanese castle

Karasawayama Castle
- 唐沢山城
- Sano, Tochigi Prefecture, Japan
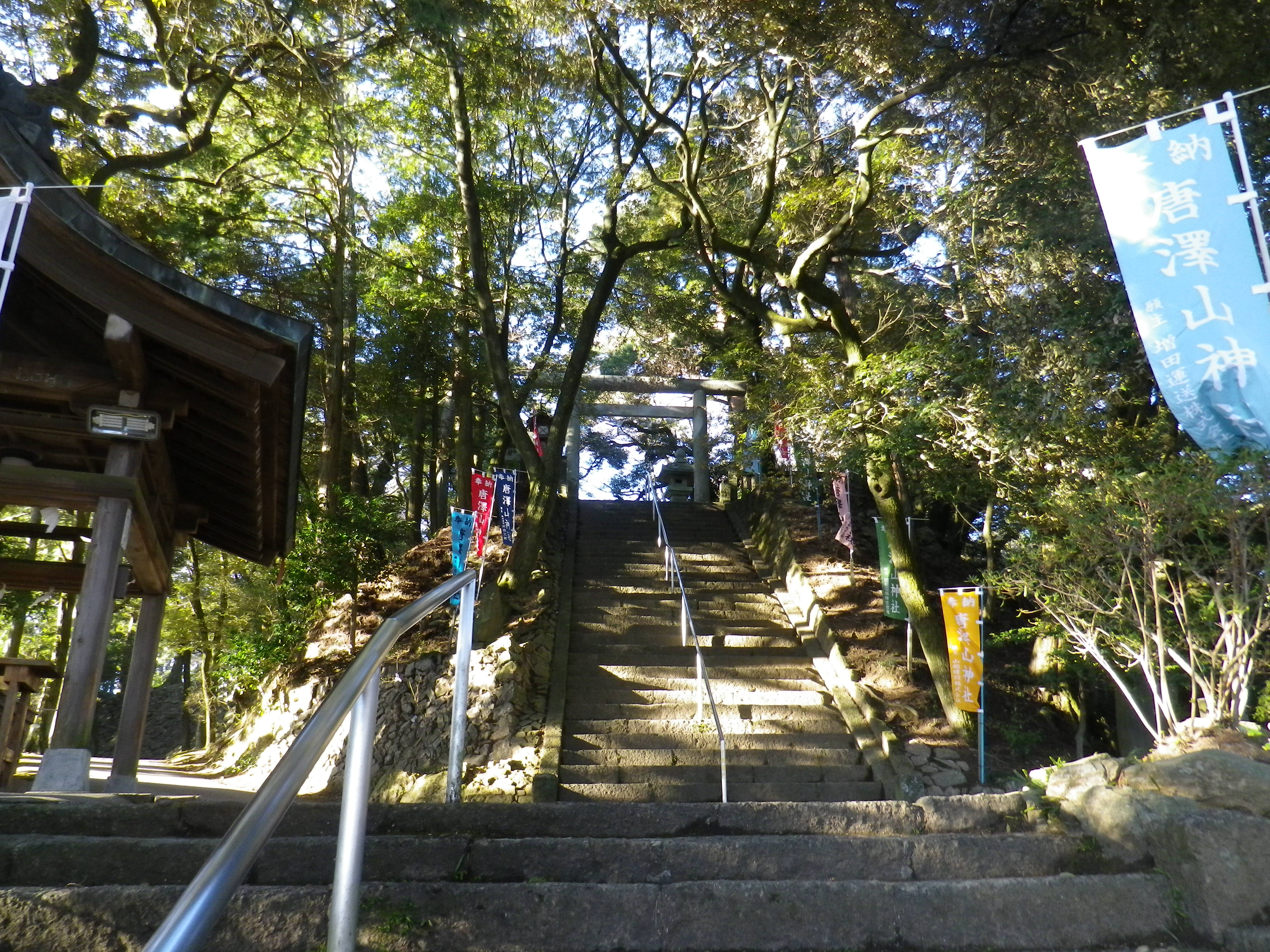
- Karasawayama Jinja, located on the site of the inner bailey

Site information
- Type: yamashiro-style Japanese castle
- Open to the public: yes
- Condition: ruins

Location
- Karasawayama Castle ruins Karasawayama Castle (Japan)
- Coordinates: 36.3538°N 139.6003°E

Site history
- Built: 927 AD
- Built by: Fujiwara no Hidesato
- In use: Sengoku period
- Demolished: 1602
- Battles/wars: Siege of Karasawayama Castle

Karasawayama Castle (唐沢山城, Karasawayama-jō) was a Japanese castle originally built in the Heian period and used through the end of the Sengoku period. It was located in what is now part of the city of Sano, Tochigi Prefecture, in the northern Kantō region of Japan. The site has been protected as a National Historic Site, since 2014.

== Background ==
Karasawayama Castle is located on a mountaintop north of the center of the modern city of Sano. It is located on a 247-meter (810 ft) ridge protruding into the northernmost portion of the Kantō Plain and was regarded by contemporary writers as one of the seven most secure fortresses of the Kantō region.

The origins of the castle is uncertain. It was controlled by the Sano clan, who claimed descent from Fujiwara no Hidesato of the Northern Fujiwara, and the date of the foundation of the castle is traditionally given as 927 AD. Fujiwara no Hidesato was assigned rule over Shimotsuke Province following the suppression of the revolt of Taira no Masakado in the Tengyō no Ran, and his descendants controlled the castle for five generations until the clan relocated its seat to Ashikaga. His 9th generation descendant rebuilt the castle in 1180 AD and changed his family name to "Sano". However, there is no mention of the castle in any documentation until 1491 AD, when Sano Moritsuna is recorded as having rebuilt the castle.

During the Sengoku period, the northern Kantō region was continually contested between the powerful Uesugi and Hōjō clan. Following the Siege of Kawagoe Castle in 1546, Uesugi Kenshin made strong inroads into the region, forcing many of the smaller warlords to submit to him. Karasawayama Castle was a key location in Kenshin's strategy as it controlled the roads to his allies in eastern Kantō, the Satake clan and the Satomi clan. Kenshin attacked the castle three times, but could not take it. On the fourth attempt, in 1563, Sano Masatsune (1529-1574) finally surrendered. However, Kenshin's lines were overextended from his base in Echigo province and he faced continual threat of attack along his flank from his arch-nemesis, the Takeda clan. As soon as he withdrew his armies, Sano Masatsune revolted. Each year for the succeeding three years, Kenshin would return with his armies, and Sano Masatsune would submit again, only to revolt one more as soon as the armies were withdrawn. In 1570, Sano Masatsune refused to submit, but Kenshin was unable to take the castle. He failed once again in 1571, after which he left the castle alone.

However, the Sano clan then came under intense pressure from the Hōjō clan and were forced to submit until the Hōjō were defeated by Toyotomi Hideyoshi at the 1590 Siege of Odawara. During the Battle of Sekigahara, the Sano supported Tokugawa Ieyasu and was awarded with control of Sano Domain with a kokudaka of 39,000 koku in 1602. They relocated their seat to Sano Castle, and due to the Shogunate's "one castle per domain" policy, Karasawayama Castle was abandoned soon afterwards. The Sano clan was subsequently dispossessed of their holdings in 1614 for reasons which are still unclear.

== Current state ==
An apocryphal tale states that when Edo caught in the Keichō fire of 1601, the fire was first reported to the authorities by runners from Sano Castle. The Shogun was outraged that the Sano could look down on his capital and thus ordered their relocation to Sano Castle. The geography makes this tale impossible; however, it is likely that the Shogunate was uncomfortable with having the stronghold of Karasawayama remain in the hands of a clan who had historically showed a tendency to switch sides at the least opportunity.

The castle ruins are spread over a 500-meter (1,600 ft) long area, and the castle was unusual for contemporary mountain castles in that it used high stone walls, sometimes incorporating massive boulders into its defenses. No structures and only small fragments of the walls and dry moats remain today. The castle grounds are now a park, and the site of inner bailey of the castle is occupied by a Shinto shrine dedicated to Fujiwara no Hidesato and built in 1883.

The castle was listed as one of the Continued Top 100 Japanese Castles in 2017.

== See also ==
- List of Historic Sites of Japan (Tochigi)

== Literature ==
- De Lange, William (2021). An Encyclopedia of Japanese Castles. Groningen: Toyo Press. pp. 600 pages. ISBN 978-9492722300.
