= Matsudaira Tadateru =

Japanese feudal lord (1592–1683)

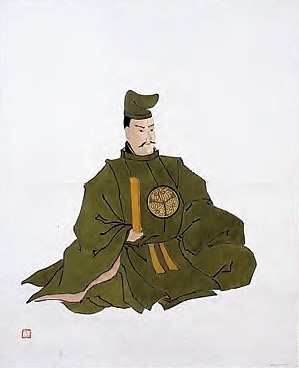
Matsudaira Tadateru

Matsudaira Tadateru (松平 忠輝; February 16, 1592 – August 24, 1683) was a daimyō during the Edo period of Japan. He was the sixth son of Tokugawa Ieyasu. He was born in Edo Castle during the year of the dragon (tatsu), and as a child his name was Tatsuchiyo (辰千代). His mother was Lady Chaa (茶阿局, Chaa no Tsubone), a concubine of Ieyasu. Ieyasu sent the boy to live with a vassal, Minagawa Hiroteru, daimyō of the Minagawa Domain in Shimotsuke Province.

== Biography ==
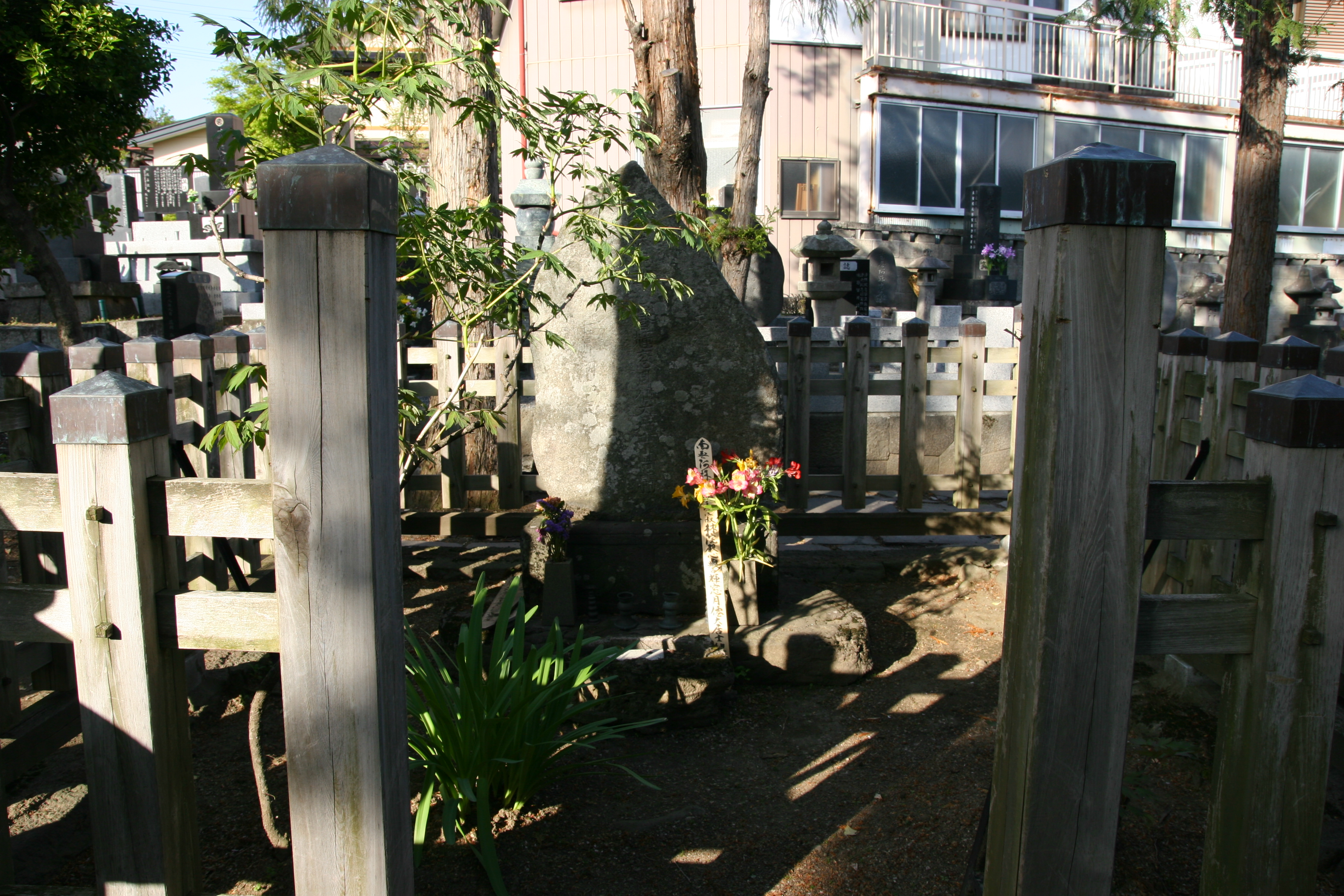
Matsudaira Tadateru's grave, at Teishoin in Suwa, Nagano

In 1599, Ieyasu granted him a fief in Musashi Province, and increased his holdings in 1602 and 1603 with transfers first to Shimōsa and then to Shinano Provinces. Tadateru married Irohahime, the first daughter of Date Masamune, in 1606. In 1610, Tadateru became daimyo of Takada in Echigo Province. He had interests in martial arts, tea, and foreign intercourse. It is said that he was baptized a Christian.

Ieyasu regarded Tadateru's wife Irohahime, the Masamune's first daughter, as dangerous. Therefore, he was treated coldly by the shogunate. He was assigned to remain in Edo during the Winter Campaign of the Siege of Osaka (1614). He participated in the Summer Campaign (1615), but due to his insubordination during the latter stages of the campaign (perceived not only as defiance of his older brother, the then shōgun Tokugawa Hidetada, but also of their father Ieyasu), he was relieved of command and exiled to Ise, then Hida, and finally Shinano Province, where he remained until his death.

The formal kaieki sanction stripping him of his domains was imposed by Hidetada on August 18, 1616. The specific insubordination that triggered the punishment included his vassal killing two of Hidetada's hatamoto during the campaign, and his failure to attend court afterward, pleading illness while reportedly going out on a boat excursion. His exile proceeded in stages: first to Asama in Ise Province in 1616, then to Takayama Domain in Hida Province in 1618, and finally to Suwa Domain in Shinano Province in 1626, where he lived near Lake Suwa until his death in 1683 at the age of 91, having outlived all of his siblings. The Nokaze no Fue (Field Wind Whistle), a flute said to have passed from Nobunaga Oda to Hideyoshi Toyotomi and then to Ieyasu, who gave it to Tadateru through Lady Chaa, is preserved today at Teisho-in Temple in Suwa City, Nagano Prefecture.

Tadateru was posthumously pardoned in 1984 by Tokugawa Tsunenari, the head of the former shogunal house.

== In popular culture ==
A 1987 television show Dokuganryū Masamune starring Hiroyuki Sanada dramatized the life of Matsudaira Tadateru.

Shinichi Chiba played Matsudaira Tadateru in the 1992 TV series Tokugawa Buraichō (徳川無頼帳).

== Family ==
- Father: Tokugawa Ieyasu
- Mother: Lady Chaa
- Adopted Father: Matsudaira Yasutada (1546–1618)
- Wife: Irohahime
- Concubine: Otake no Kata
- Children:
  - Tokumatsu (1614-1632) by Otake
  - Gotakehime (1615-1621) by Otake

Preceded by Matsudaira Matsuchiyo	Daimyō of Fukaya; 1599–1602	Succeeded by Sakai Tadakatsu
Preceded by Takeda Nobuyoshi	Daimyō of Sakura; 1602–1603	Succeeded by Ogasawara Yoshitsugu
Preceded by Mori Tadamasa	Daimyō of Kawanakajima; 1603–1610	Succeeded by Matsudaira Masatada
Preceded by Hori Tadatoshi	Daimyō of Takada; 1610–1616	Succeeded by Sakai Ietsugu
