= Irohahime =

Japanese noble lady (1594–1661)

- 五郎八姫
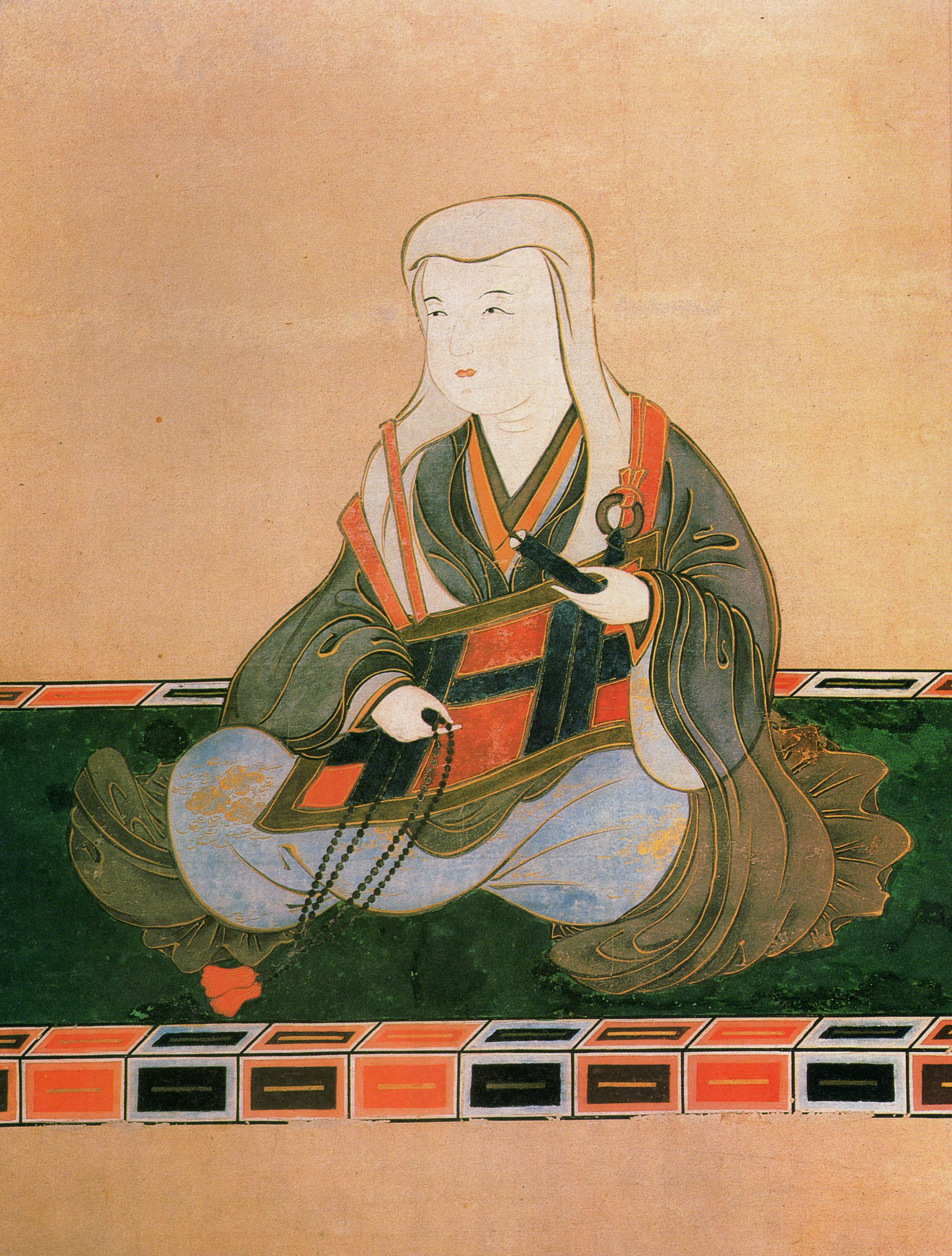
- Born: August 2, 1594; Jurakudai, Kyoto
- Died: June 4, 1661 (aged 66)
- Other name: Tenrin'in (天麟院)
- Spouse: Matsudaira Tadateru
- Parent(s): Date Masamune; Megohime
- Family: Date clan Matsudaira clan

Irohahime (五郎八姫; August 2, 1594 – June 4, 1661) was a Japanese noble lady and aristocrat from the Sengoku period and Edo period. She was the first daughter of Date Masamune and Megohime, as well as the wife of Matsudaira Tadateru, the sixth son of Tokugawa Ieyasu. Her Buddhist name is Tenrin'in (天麟院).

== Life ==
Irohahime was born in Jurakudai. She was Masamune's first conjugal child. Although the married couple would have been hopeful for a boy to take over the Date family, the baby born to them was a girl. As Masamune was expecting a son, he personally chose a masculine name. After she was born, however, the name was kept, but pronounced more femininely.

Having moved from place to place, from Jurakudai to Fushimi, and then to Osaka, Irohahime was engaged to Ieyasu's son, Tadateru, on January 20, 1599, as part of Ieyasu's strategy for strengthening relationships with powerful daimyō. In 1603, she moved from Fushimi to Edo, and on December 24, 1606, she married Tadateru. Though the two got along, they had no children. In 1616, she divorced Tadateru when he was stripped of his position, and returned to her father, Masamune, thereafter living in Sendai.

As she lived in the Nishikan (the west annex) of the main castle in this period, she was also called Lady Nishikan (西館殿). She died on June 4, 1661, at the age of 68. Her grave is in Tenrinin Temple in Matsushima.

== Legends ==
- Irohahime was such a beautiful and intelligent daughter that her father was led to lament, "imagine if she had been a boy." Date Tadamune, a younger brother by the same mother, also relied on her for her intelligence.
- Irohahime was allegedly a Christian, as her real mother Megohime had been a Christian for a time. When she divorced Tadateru, she was still in her early twenties and her father and mother, concerning about their beloved Irohahime, allegedly asked her to remarry, but she kept refusing. It is generally accepted that she refused offers of marriage throughout the rest of her life, no matter how earnestly her parents and those around her advised her to remarry because she believed in the Christian doctrine, which does not allow divorce.
- Because Irohahime was born and raised in Kyoto, her words and customs were also in the Kyoto style. When she moved to Sendai after her divorce, she had a hard time getting used to the Tōhoku dialect as well as Tōhoku's way of living.

== In popular culture ==
She makes an appearance in the NHK taiga drama Dokuganryū Masamune, and she is portrayed by Sawaguchi Yasuko.
