= Chaa-Khol =

Chaa-Khol Чаа-Холь
- Selo

Other transcription(s)
  - Tuvan: Чаа Чаа-Хөл
- Interactive map of Chaa-Khol
- Location of Chaa-Khol Chaa-Khol (Tuva Republic)
- Coordinates: 51°31′05″N 92°20′01″E
- Country: Russia
- Federal subject: Tuva
- Administrative district: Chaa-Kholsky District
- SumonSelsoviet: Chaa-Kholsky
- Founded: 1887

Population (2010 Census)
  - Total: 3,250
  - Estimate (2021): 3,394 (+4.4%)

Administrative status
  - Capital of: Chaa-Kholsky District, Chaa-Kholsky Sumon

Municipal status
  - Municipal district: Chaa-Kholsky Municipal District
  - Rural settlement: Chaa-Kholsky Sumon Rural Settlement
  - Capital of: Chaa-Kholsky Municipal District, Chaa-Kholsky Sumon Rural Settlement
- Time zone: UTC+7 (MSK+4)
- Postal code: 668221
- OKTMO ID: 93656440101

Chaa-Khol (Russian: Чаа-Холь; Tuvan: Чаа Чаа-Хөл, romanized: Çaa Çaa-Xöl) is a rural locality (a selo) and the administrative center of Chaa-Kholsky District of Tuva, Russia. Population: 3,250 (2010 census); 3,453 (2002 census);
