= Hotta Masatsugu =

3rd daimyō of Sano Domain

Viscount Hotta Masatsugu
- 堀田正頌
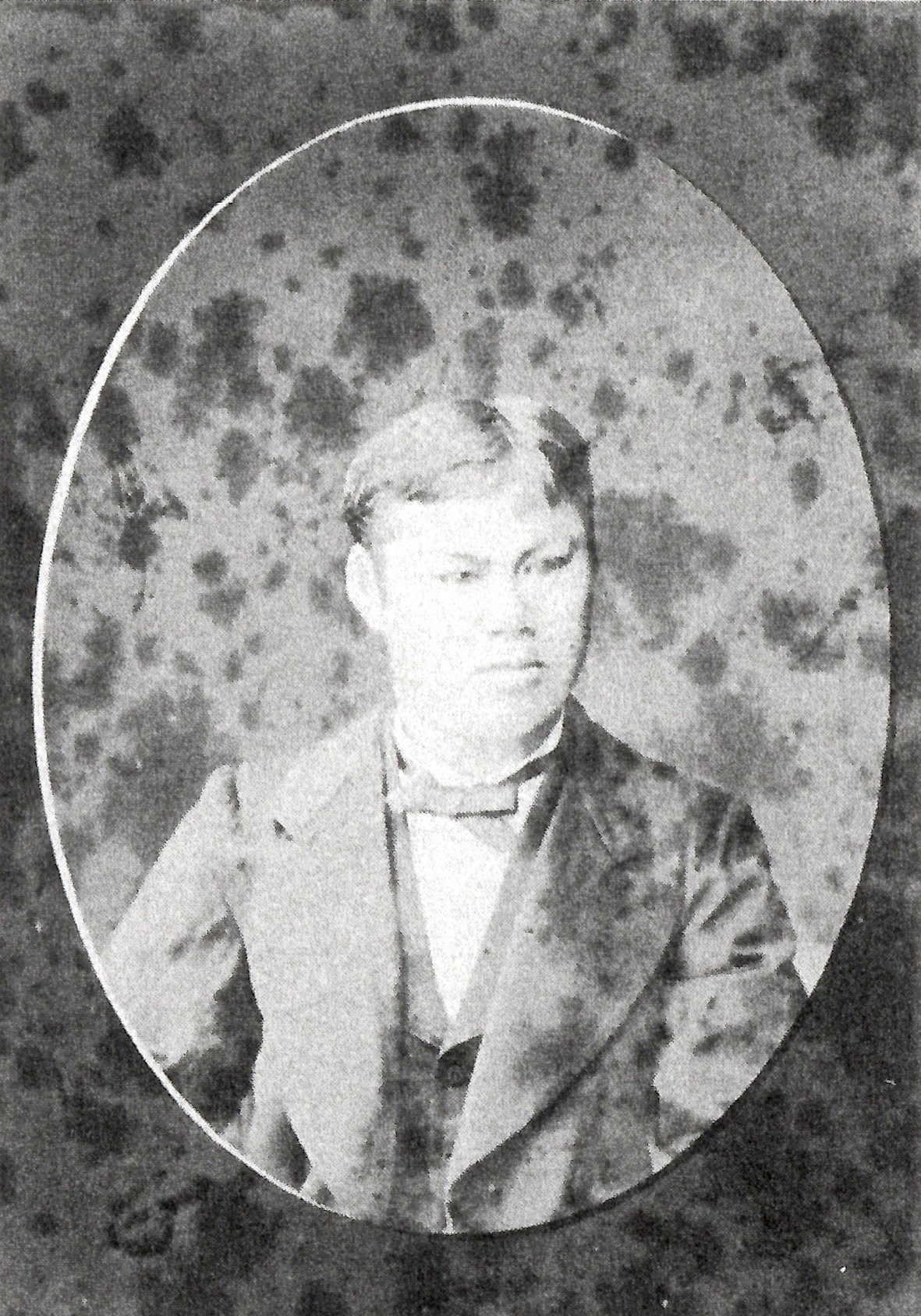
- Hotta Masatsugu after the Meiji restoration

3rd Daimyō of Sano Domain
- In office 1854–1868
- Monarchs: Shōgun: Tokugawa Iesada; Tokugawa Iemochi; Tokugawa Yoshinobu
- Preceded by: Hotta MAsahira
- Succeeded by: < position abolished >

Imperial Governor of Sano
- In office 1868–1871
- Monarch: Emperor Meiji

Personal details
- Born: December 14, 1842
- Died: May 11, 1896 (aged 53)}
- Parent: Hotta Masamoto (father)

Hotta Masatsugu (堀田正頌; December 14, 1842 – May 11, 1896) was the third (and final) daimyō of Sano Domain in Shimotsuke Province, Honshū, Japan (modern-day Tochigi Prefecture) under then Bakumatsu period Tokugawa shogunate. His courtesy title was Settsu-no-kami, later Shinano-no-kami and his Court rank was Junior Fifth Rank, Lower Grade.

== Biography ==
Hotta Masatsugu was the son of Hotta Masamoto, but as his father died young, he succeeded his grandfather, Hotta Masahira as daimyō of Sano. Despite his young age, he had good political acumen and capable advisors. He is noted for opening a han school. He was received in formal audience by Shogun Tokugawa Iesada in 1857. In 1868, he declared for the new Meiji government and supplied weapons to the new armies fighting to overthrow the Tokugawa shogunate. He was received by Emperor Meiji later that year, and in 1869 was appointed imperial governor of Sano.

After the Meiji Restoration, with the abolition of the han system in 1871 he relocated to Tokyo. In 1884, he was raised to the kazoku peerage title of shishaku (viscount).

== See also ==
- Hotta clan
