= Hotta Masayoshi =

Japanese official and daimyo (1810–1864)

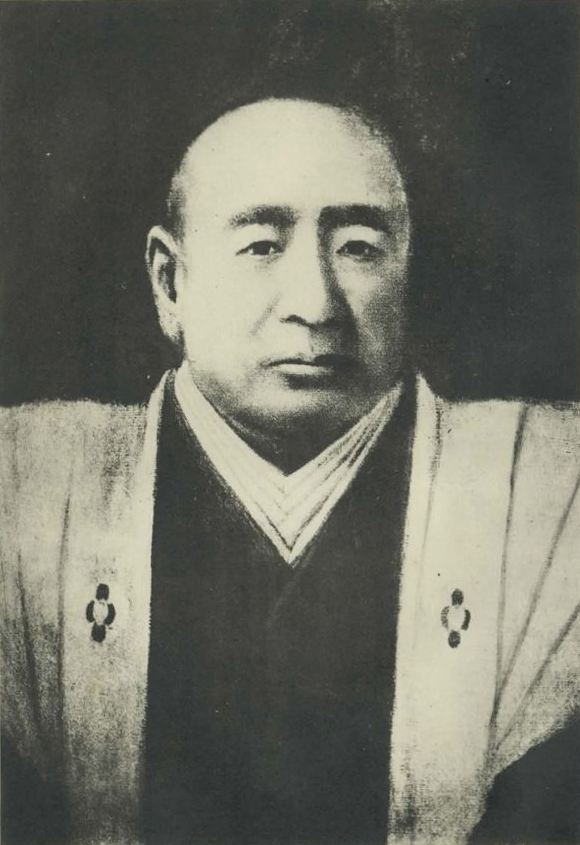
- Hotta Masayoshi

5th (Hotta) Lord of Sakura
- In office 1825–1859
- Preceded by: Hotta Masachika
- Succeeded by: Hotta Masamichi

Personal details
- Born: August 30, 1810 Edo, Japan
- Died: April 26, 1864 (aged 53) Sakura, Chiba, Japan

Hotta Masayoshi (堀田 正睦; August 30, 1810 – April 26, 1864) was the 5th Hotta daimyō of the Sakura Domain in the Japanese Edo period, who served as chief rōjū in the Bakumatsu period Tokugawa shogunate, where he played an important role in the negotiations of the Ansei Treaties with various foreign powers.

== Early life ==
Hotta Masayoshi was the younger son of the 3rd daimyō of Sakura, Hotta Masatoki, and was born at the domain's Edo residence. On the death of his father in 1811, he was adopted by his elder brother, the 4th daimyo of Sakura, Hotta Masachika, to secure the family succession. Masachika was of sickly physique and by 1824 there was a movement by the senior line of the Hotta clan to have him removed from office, and replaced by the son of Hotta Masatsu, the daimyo of Katada Domain and a wakadoshiyori in the government. This was strongly opposed by most of the leadership of the Sakura domain, and Hotta Masayoshi was appointed daimyo. Almost immediately, the domain was saddled with the fiscally taxing burden of improving coastal defenses in Edo Bay against incursions of the Black Ships. However, Masayoshi proved an able administrator, reforming the domain's finances, sponsoring studies of rangaku, especially western military science, and establishing the predecessor of Juntendo University.

== Official career ==
In April 1829, he was appointed a Sōshaban and in August 1834 became Jisha-bugyō. In May 1837 he was appointed Osaka-jō dai, however only two months later he was recalled to Edo to join the ranks of the rōjū. From 1841, he was regarded as the right arm of Mizuno Tadakuni, the architect of the Tenpō Reforms. However, after Mizuno fell out of favor in 1843 due to failure of the Tenpō Reforms, Hotta also lost his position as rōjū.

Returning to Sakura, Hotta remained one of the leaders of the party supporting ending the sakoku isolation policy and opening the country to foreign trade. In August 1855, the Ansei great earthquakes struck Japan, and the Hotta clan residence in Edo was destroyed. A week later, senior rōjū Abe Masahiro requested that Hotta return to the ranks of the rōjū.

Abe came under criticism from the tozama daimyōs, the Imperial Court and various factions within the government for perceived appeasement to the foreign powers in authorizing the signing treaties with the various western powers, starting with the Convention of Kanagawa which effectively ended the 220-year policy of national isolation, and in September 1855 was forced to resign his post, and was replaced by Hotta the following month, although Abe remained one of the rōjū and a powerful influence until his death in 1857.

=== Gaikoku-bōeki-toshirabe-gakari ===
On October 17, 1856, Hotta formed and headed an ad hoc committee of officials with special knowledge of foreign affairs. In November 1856, he charged the members to come up with recommendations about the terms for opening Japanese ports. The results of their deliberations would become the basis for negotiations which ultimately resulted in the Treaty of Amity and Commerce of 1858 (also known as the Harris Treaty), which open up six ports to American trade, and established extraterritoriality. Based on his knowledge of the events of the Arrow War, Hotta believed that a violent response from the United States would arise if the demands of American consul Townsend Harris were refused. However, it was necessary to convince the Emperor Kōmei to accept the treaty. Traveling to Kyoto, Hotta found the Emperor securely in the midst of the jōi faction within the Imperial Court, who favored expelling the foreigners from Japan, by force if necessary, and was forced to return to Edo empty-handed. On top of this, shōgun Tokugawa Iesada was very ill and factional strife erupted within the Shogunal court over who would be his successor. With these issues still largely unresolved, Hotta was replaced by Ii Naosuke on June 21, 1858, who was given the title of tairō.

On September 6, 1859, Hotta resigned his posts in favor of his son, and went into official retirement. He continued to lend his political support to the Hitotsubashi faction which was opposed to Ii Naosuke, and during the Ansei purge of Hitotsubashi partisans, he was placed under house arrest within Sakura Castle, where he died on March 31, 1864, at the age of 53.

== Ancestry ==
Ancestors of Hotta Masayoshi

16. Hotta Masatoshi (1634–1684)
8. Hotta Masatake (1685–1715)
17. Sakai
4. Hotta Masasuke, 1st Lord of Sakura (1712–1761)
9. Kobayashi
2. Hotta Masatoki, 3rd Lord of Sakura (1761–1811)
5. Machida
1. Hotta Masayoshi
6. Genta Mitsutoshi
3. Genta Yoshio

== Notes ==
Preceded by Hotta Masachika	5th (Hotta) Daimyō of Sakura; 1825–1859	Succeeded by Hotta Masamichi
