= Sakura Domain =

Sakura Domain 佐倉藩
- under Tokugawa shogunate Japan
- 1593–1871
- Capital: Sakura Castle
  - Type: Daimyō
- Historical era: Edo period
  - Established: 1593
  - Disestablished: 1871
- Today part of: part of Chiba Prefecture

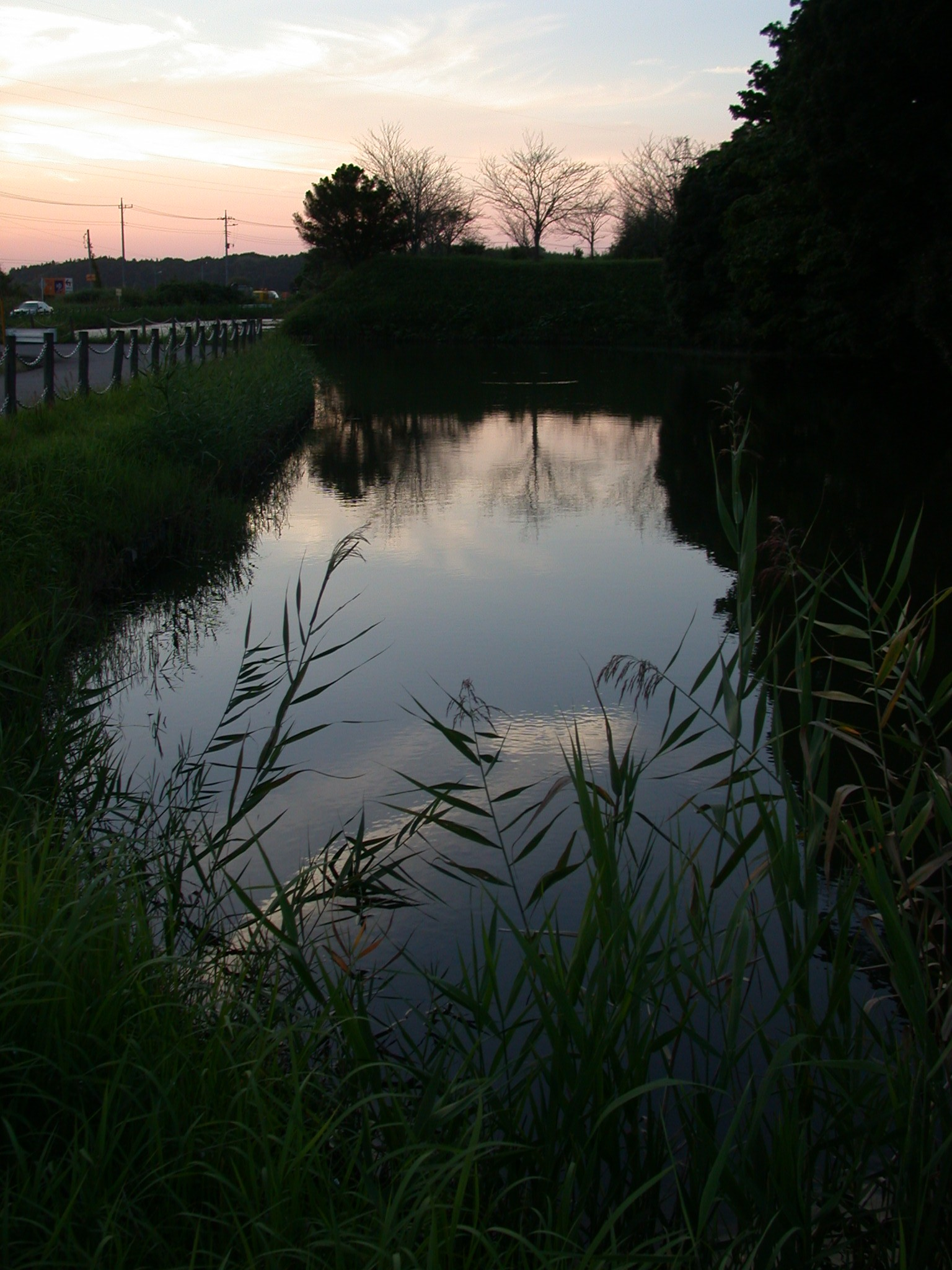
Moats of Sakura Castle, administrative center of Sakura Domain

Sakura Domain (佐倉藩, Sakura-han) was a feudal domain under the Tokugawa shogunate of Edo period Japan, located in Shimōsa Province (modern-day Chiba Prefecture), Japan. It was centered on Sakura Castle in what is now the city of Sakura, Chiba. It was ruled for most of its history by the Hotta clan.

== History ==
Sakura Domain was originally created for Takeda Tadateru, the fifth son of Tokugawa Ieyasu in 1593, near the site of an ancient castle of the Chiba clan, which had fallen into ruins in the early Sengoku period. The domain subsequently passed through a bewildering number of hands during the 1600s, before coming under the control of the Hotta clan in the mid-18th century. During the Bakumatsu period, Hotta Masayoshi was one of the major proponents of rangaku and an ending to the country’s national isolation policy. He was one of the signers of the Treaty of Amity and Commerce with the United States. His son, Hotta Masatomo was a key supporter of the Tokugawa shogunate in the early stages of the Boshin War. After the Meiji Restoration, he was pardoned, and eventually made a count (hakushaku) in the kazoku peerage.

== Holdings at the end of the Edo period ==
As with most domains in the han system, Sakura Domain consisted of several discontinuous territories calculated to provide the assigned kokudaka, based on periodic cadastral surveys and projected agricultural yields.

- Shimōsa Province
  - 31 villages in Chiba District
  - 146 villages in Imba District
  - 26 villages in Shimohabu District
  - 3 villages in Katori District
  - 3 villages in Sōsa District
  - 2 villages in Kaijō District
  - 8 villages in Sōma District
- Dewa Province (Uzen)
  - 45 villages in Murayama District
- Hitachi Province
  - 3 villages in Tsukuba District
  - 3 villages in Makabe District
- Shimotsuke Province
  - 16 villages in Tsuga District
  - 10 villages in Shioya District
- Musashi Province
  - 3 villages in Saitama District
  - 1 village in Koma District
  - 2 villages in Iruma District
  - 14 villages in Yokomi District
- Sagami Province
  - 5 villages in Kōza District
  - 10 villages in Ōsumi District
  - 2 villages in Aiko District

== List of daimyō ==
#	Name	Tenure	Courtesy title	Court Rank	kokudaka
Takeda clan (shimpan) 1593-1602
1	Takeda Nobuyoshi (武田信吉)	1593–1602	-none-	-none-	40,000 koku
Matsudaira clan (shimpan) 1602-1603
1	Matsudaira Tadateru (松平忠輝)	1602–1603	Sakone-no-shosho (左近衛少将)	Lower 4th (従四位下)	50,000 koku
Ogasawara clan (fudai) 1603-1608
1	Ogasawara Yoshitsugu (小笠原吉次)	1603–1608	Izumi-no-kami (和泉守)	Lower 5th (従五位下)	22,000 koku
Doi clan (fudai) 1608-1633
1	Doi Toshikatsu (土井利勝)	1608–1633	Ōi-no-kami (大炊頭); Jiju (侍従)	Lower 4th (従四位下)	32,000 –> 142,000 koku
Ishikawa clan (fudai) 1633-1634
1	Ishikawa Tadafusa (石川忠総)	1633–1634	Tonomo-no-kami (大炊頭)	Lower 4th (従四位下)	70,000 koku
Matsudaira (Katahara) clan (fudai) 1634-1640
1	Matsudaira Ienobu (松平家信)	1634-1638	Kii-no-kami (紀伊守)	Lower 4th (従四位下)	40,000 koku
2	Matsudaira Yasunobu (松平康信)	1638–1640	Wakasa-no-kami (若狭守)	Lower 4th (従四位下)	40,000 koku
Hotta clan (fudai) 1642-1640
1	Hotta Masamori (堀田正盛)	1642-1651	Dewa-no-kami (出羽守); Jiju (侍従)	Lower 4th (従四位下)	110,000 koku
2	Hotta Masanobu (堀田正信)	1651–1660	Kozuke-no-suke (上野介)	Lower 5th (従五位下)	110,000 koku
Matsudaira clan (fudai) 1661-1678
1	Matsudaira Norihisa (松平乗久)	1661–1678	Izumi-no-kami (和泉守)	Lower 4th (従五位下)	60,000 koku
Ōkubo clan (fudai) 1678-1686
1	Ōkubo Tadatomo (大久保 忠朝)	1678–1686	Kaga-no-kami (加賀守); Jiju (侍従)	Lower 4th (従四位下)	83,000 –> 93,000 koku
Toda clan (fudai) 1699-1701
1	Toda Tadamasa (戸田 忠昌)	1686–1699	Yamashiro-no-kami (山城守); Jiju (侍従)	Lower 4th (従四位下)	61,000 –> 71,000 koku
1	Toda Tadazane (戸田忠真)	1699–1701	Yamashiro-no-kami (山城守); Jiju (侍従)	Lower 4th (従四位下)	71,000 koku
Inaba clan (fudai) 1701-1723
1	Inaba Masamichi (稲葉正往)	1701–1707	Tango-no-kami (丹後守); Jiju (侍従)	Lower 4th (従四位下)	102,000 koku
2	Inaba Masatomo (稲葉正知)	1707–1723	Tango-no-kami (丹後守)	Lower 4th (従四位下)	102,000 koku
Matsudaira clan (fudai) 1723-1746
1	Matsudaira Norisato (松平乗邑)	1723–1745	Izumi-no-kami (和泉守); Jiju (侍従)	Lower 4th (従四位下)	60,000 koku
2	Matsudaira Norisuke (松平乗祐)	1745–1746	Izumi-no-kami (和泉守)	Lower 5th (従五位下)	60,000 koku
Hotta clan (fudai) 1746-1871
1	Hotta Masasuke (堀田正亮)	1746–1761	Sagami-no-kami (相模守); Jiju (侍従)	Lower 4th (従四位下)	100,000 ->110,000 koku
2	Hotta Masanari (堀田正順)	1761–1805	Sagami-no-kami (相模守); Jiju (侍従)	Lower 4th (従四位下)	110,000 koku
3	Hotta Masatoki (堀田正時)	1805–1811	Sagami-no-kami (相模守)	Lower 5th (従五位下)	110,000 koku
4	Hotta Masachika (堀田正愛)	1811–1824	Sagami-no-kami (相模守)	Lower 5th (従五位下)	110,000 koku
5	Hotta Masayoshi (堀田正睦)	1825–1859	Sagami-no-kami (相模守)	Lower 4th (従四位下)	110,000 koku
6	Hotta Masatomo (堀田正倫)	1859–1871	Sagami-no-kami (相模守)	Lower 5th (従五位下)	110,000 koku
