= Takeda Nobuyoshi =

Japanese daimyō

Takeda Nobuyoshi (武田 信吉; October 18, 1583 – October 15, 1603) was a Japanese daimyō of the early Edo period. He was the son of shogun Tokugawa Ieyasu.

== Life ==
Born Tokugawa Fukumatsumaru (福松丸), he was one of Tokugawa Ieyasu's sons. His mother is believed to have been Otoma, the daughter of Takeda clan retainer Akiyama Torayasu. As Ieyasu took pity on the destroyed Takeda clan, he changed his son's name to Takeda Manchiyomaru (万千代丸) and then Takeda Shichirō (七郎) Nobuyoshi. He entrusted the boy to the care of the Anayama of Kai Province.

After Ieyasu's move into the Kantō region, Nobuyoshi was granted a 30,000 koku fief centered on Kogane Castle in Shimōsa Province. From Kogane he was moved to Sakura Castle, and a fief of 100,000 koku. In 1600, for his service as rusui-yaku for the western enceinte of Edo Castle, Ieyasu (victorious in the wake of the Sekigahara Campaign) gave his son the 250,000 koku Mito fief. However, as Nobuyoshi had been sickly from birth, he soon died at the age of 19. With Nobuyoshi's death, the Takeda of Kai came to a second end.

== Family ==
- Father: Tokugawa Ieyasu
- Mother: Otoma no Kata (1564–1591) later Myoshin-in
- Adopted Father: Anayama Katsuchiyo (another name Takeda Nobuharu) (1572–1587)
- Adopted Mother: Gensho-in (d. 1622)
- Wife: Tenshoin
- Concubine: Otsu no Kata
