= Minagawa =

Minagawa (written: 皆川) is a Japanese surname. Notable people with the surname include:

- Hiroe Minagawa (皆川 博恵, born 1987), Japanese sport wrestler
- Hiroko Minagawa (皆川 博子, born 1930), Japanese writer
- Hiroshi Minagawa (皆川 裕史, born 1970), Japanese video game artist, designer and director
- Junko Minagawa (皆川 純子, born 1975), Japanese voice actress
- Kaho Minagawa (皆川 夏帆, born 1997), Japanese rhythmic gymnast
- Kentaro Minagawa (皆川 賢太郎, born 1977), Japanese alpine skier
- Ryōji Minagawa (皆川 亮二, born 1964), Japanese manga artist
- Yasuo Minagawa (皆川 康夫, born 1947), retired Japanese professional baseball pitcher
- Yusuke Minagawa (皆川 佑介, born 1991), Japanese international football player
