= Sakura Castle =

Ruins of a 17th-century castle in Sakura (Chiba Prefecture)

- 佐倉城
- Sakura, Chiba Prefecture, Japan
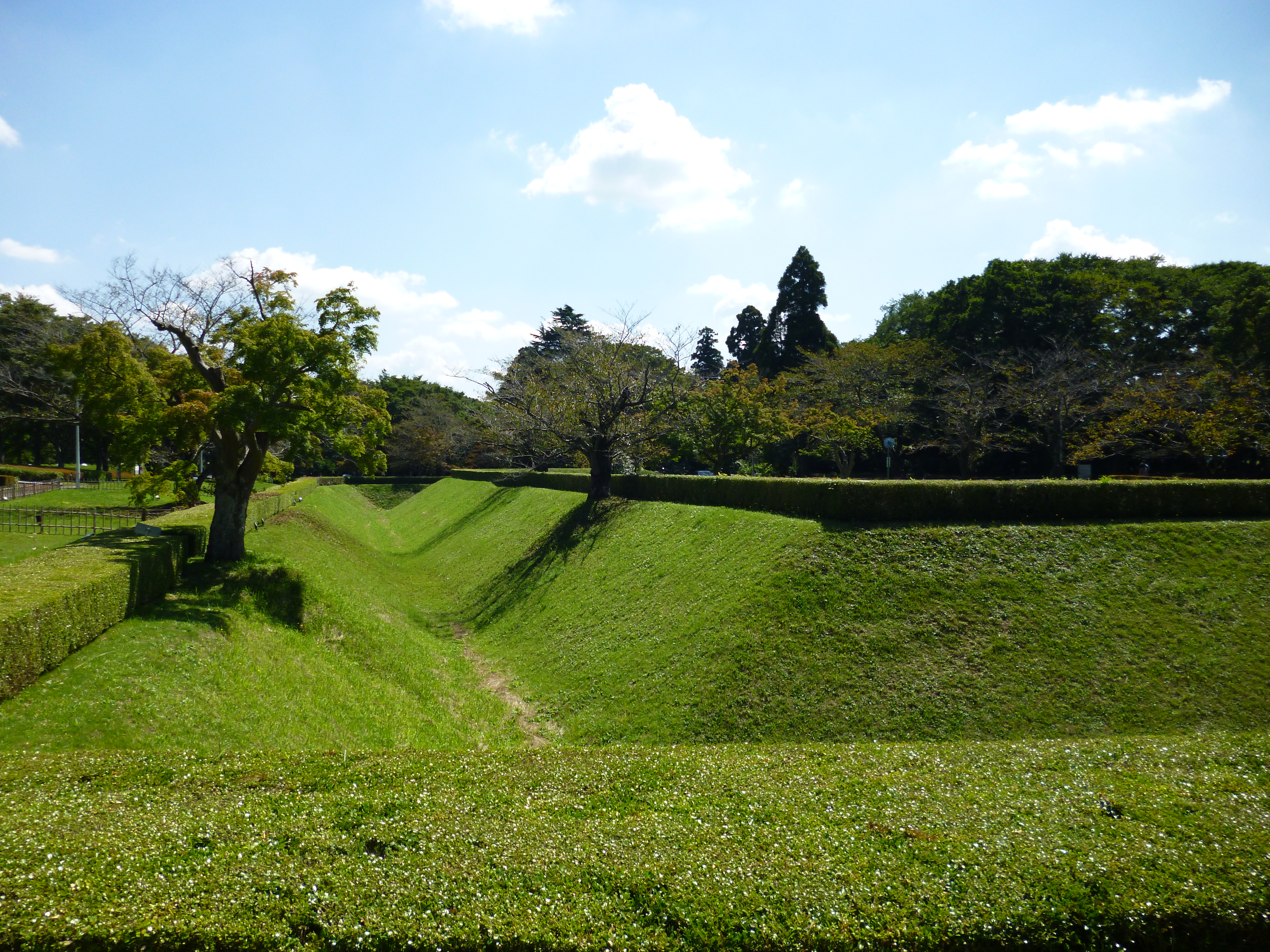
- Sakura Castle grounds

Site information
- Type: Japanese castle
- Open to the public: yes
- Condition: ruins

Location
- Sakura Castle
- Location within Chiba Prefecture Location within Japan
- Coordinates: 35.7220°N 140.2167°E

Site history
- Built: 1532-1555
- Built by: Chiba Kunitane, Doi Toshikatsu
- In use: Edo period
- Demolished: 1873

Sakura Castle (佐倉城, Sakura-jō) was a 17th-century castle, now in ruins, in Sakura, Chiba Prefecture. It was designated one of Japan's Top 100 Castles by the Japanese Castle Foundation.

== History ==
Sakura Castle fell to Honda Tadakatsu and Sakai Ietsugu of the Tokugawa army during the Siege of Odawara (1590). Chiba Shigetane, daimyō of the Chiba clan, surrendered the castle to the besieging forces on the condition that his clan would not be abolished.

Under the orders of his Lord, Tokugawa Ieyasu, Doi Toshikatsu started construction of this castle in 1610. It was completed in 1617. It was based on the foundations and unfinished work of the Chiba clan, who had started building Kashima Castle on the same site, in the earlier Sengoku period.

During the Edo era, it was ruled by powerful lords, all loyal to the Tokugawa rule. Sakura Castle was considered a location of strategic importance, in particular as it protected the eastern flank of Edo. At its peak it was a large complex; however, it was noted for having no stone walls. The defensive lines were reinforced by deep, dry moats, and earthen embankments (ramparts) demarcated the baileys. The main keep was actually a yagura relocated from Edo Castle.

The park was used as an army barracks during World War II.

== Current site ==
There is little left of the original castle, except for the moats, earthen walls, and some stone stairs. The National Museum of Japanese History stands on the site of the castle.
