= Hotta Masamori =

Japanese daimyo

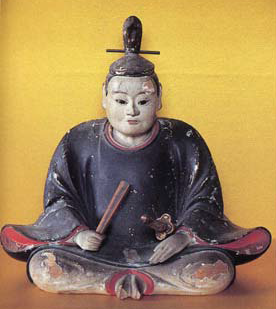
Hotta Masamori

Hotta Masamori (堀田 正盛; January 16, 1606 – June 8, 1651) was a Japanese daimyō of the early Edo period who was a key figure in the early decades of the Tokugawa shogunate.

== Origins ==
Hotta Masamori rose through the ranks of the Tokugawa shogunate; his family had a very short history with the Tokugawa family prior to his father Masayoshi's generation. Masayoshi was granted a 700 koku stipend and his house instituted as a hatamoto family, following his and his ancestors' service with a variety of other clans, among them the Oda, Toyotomi, Maeda, and Kobayakawa. Thanks to his distinction at the Osaka Winter Campaign, Masayoshi was granted an increase in stipend to 1000 koku, and the family was at this level of income when Masamori succeeded his father as the family head.

== Career ==
The early period of Masamori's rise in the ranks can be ascribed to his relation to Lady Kasuga, the Shōgun Iemitsu's wetnurse. Because of this connection, he was close to the Shōgun, and this was to open the doors wide for his future success. In 1626 (Kan'ei-3), he received his first post as a captain of the page corps (koshōgumi-bangashira). His income subsequently rose to the range of 5000 koku, and an additional 5000 koku was granted that year. He entered the ranks of the fudai daimyōs with the income of 10,000 koku.

On the 23rd day of the 3rd month of Kan'ei 10 (1633), he was appointed a member of the rokunin-shu (what became the wakadoshiyori council) together with Matsudaira Nobutsuna, and was granted another 5000 koku, together with the rank that came with being a castle lord. Masamori was subsequently shown great favor by Iemitsu, who promoted him to Rōjū on the 1st day of the 3rd month of Kan'ei 12 (1635). His income rose to 1,000,000 koku, and he was granted the fief of Matsumoto Domain, in Shinano Province. In 1642 he was moved to Sakura Domain in Shimotsuke Province, where his family remained enfeoffed at 110,000 koku for the remainder of the Edo period. Masamori committed junshi (suicide after the death of one's lord) in 1651, at the age of 44.

Preceded by Sakai Tadakatsu	Daimyō of Kawagoe; 1635–1638	Succeeded by Matsudaira Nobutsuna
Preceded by Matsudaira Naomasa	Daimyō of Matsumoto; 1638–1642	Succeeded by Mizuno Tadakiyo
Preceded by Matsudaira Yasunobu	Daimyō of Sakura; 1642–1651	Succeeded by Hotta Masanobu
