= Hotta Masayasu (Viscount) =

Japanese politician (1848–1911)

Viscount Hotta Masayasu
- 堀田 正養
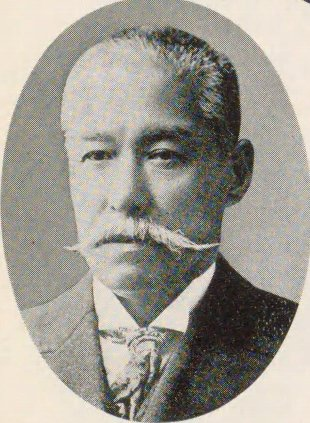
- Hotta Masayasu, post-Meiji restoration

Minister of Communications
- In office 25 March 1908 – 19 July 1908
- Prime Minister: Saionji Kinmochi
- Preceded by: Hara Takashi
- Succeeded by: Gotō Shinpei

Member of the House of Peers
- In office 10 July 1890 – 9 May 1911 Elected by the Viscounts

Governor of Miyagawa Domain
- In office 23 June 1869 – 14 July 1871
- Monarch: Meiji
- Preceded by: Himself (as Daimyō of Ōmi-Miyagawa)
- Succeeded by: Position abolished

Daimyō of Ōmi-Miyagawa Domain
- In office 4 July 1863 – 16 February 1868
- Shōgun: Tokugawa Iemochi; Tokugawa Yoshinobu
- Preceded by: Hotta Masami
- Succeeded by: Himself (as Governor of Miyagawa)

Personal details
- Born: 1 April 1848 Yurihonjō, Akita, Japan
- Died: 9 May 1911 (aged 63)
- Parent: Iwaki Takahiro (father)
- Relatives: Hotta Masami (father-in-law)

Viscount Hotta Masayasu (堀田正養; 1 April 1848 – 9 May 1911) was the 9th and final daimyō of Ōmi-Miyagawa Domain under the Tokugawa shogunate, and served as a politician and cabinet minister in the post-Meiji Restoration Empire of Japan.

== Biography ==
Hotta Masayasu was born as the 9th son of Iwaki Takahiro, the daimyō of Kameda Domain in Dewa Province. He was married to a daughter of Hotta Masami, the daimyō of Ōmi-Miyagawa Domain and upon Hotta Masami's death, he was posthumously adopted on 4 July 1863 to carry on the Hotta family name as daimyō of the 13,000 koku domain. He was received in formal audience by Shōgun Tokugawa Iemochi on 21 July, and was given the courtesy title of Buzen-no-kami and lower 5th court rank on 26 November. In July 1864, he was assigned the post of Osaka Kaban. Following the Boshin War on 16 February 1868, the new Meiji government abolished Miyagawa Domain and assigned its territory to neighboring Hikone Domain and temporarily placed him under house arrest. However, on 23 June 1869, Hotta was returned to his former holdings as Imperial Governor, retaining that position until the abolition of the han system in 1871. In September 1871, he relocated to Tokyo.

In December 1878, Hotta was elected to a seat in the Tokyo Prefectural Assembly from Asasuka Ward (now part of Taitō, Tokyo), becoming Chairman of the Assembly in March 1879. In January 1880, he became head of Akasaka Ward (now part of Minato, Tokyo) and in June 1881, he became head of Shitaya Ward (now part of Taitō, Tokyo) followed by Fukawaga Ward (now part of Kōtō, Tokyo) in August of the same year. In July 1884, he was awarded the kazoku peerage title of shishaku (viscount). He was president of the Chikuhō Railway (筑豊鉄道, Chikuhō Tetsudō), a local railway line which operated in Fukuoka Prefecture from 1891 to 1897.

In July 1890, Hotta became a member of the House of Peers in the new Diet of Japan. On 25 March 1908 he joined the First Saionji Cabinet as Minister of Communications, but was forced to resign with the collapse of the Saionji Cabinet in July of the same year.
