= Jurakudai =

Residence built for Toyotomi Hideyoshi in Kyoto

Coordinates: 35°01′30″N 135°44′45″E

Japanese name
- Kana: じゅらくだい/じゅらくてい
- Kyūjitai: 聚樂第
- Shinjitai: 聚楽第
Transcriptions
- Revised Hepburn: Jurakudai/Jurakutei

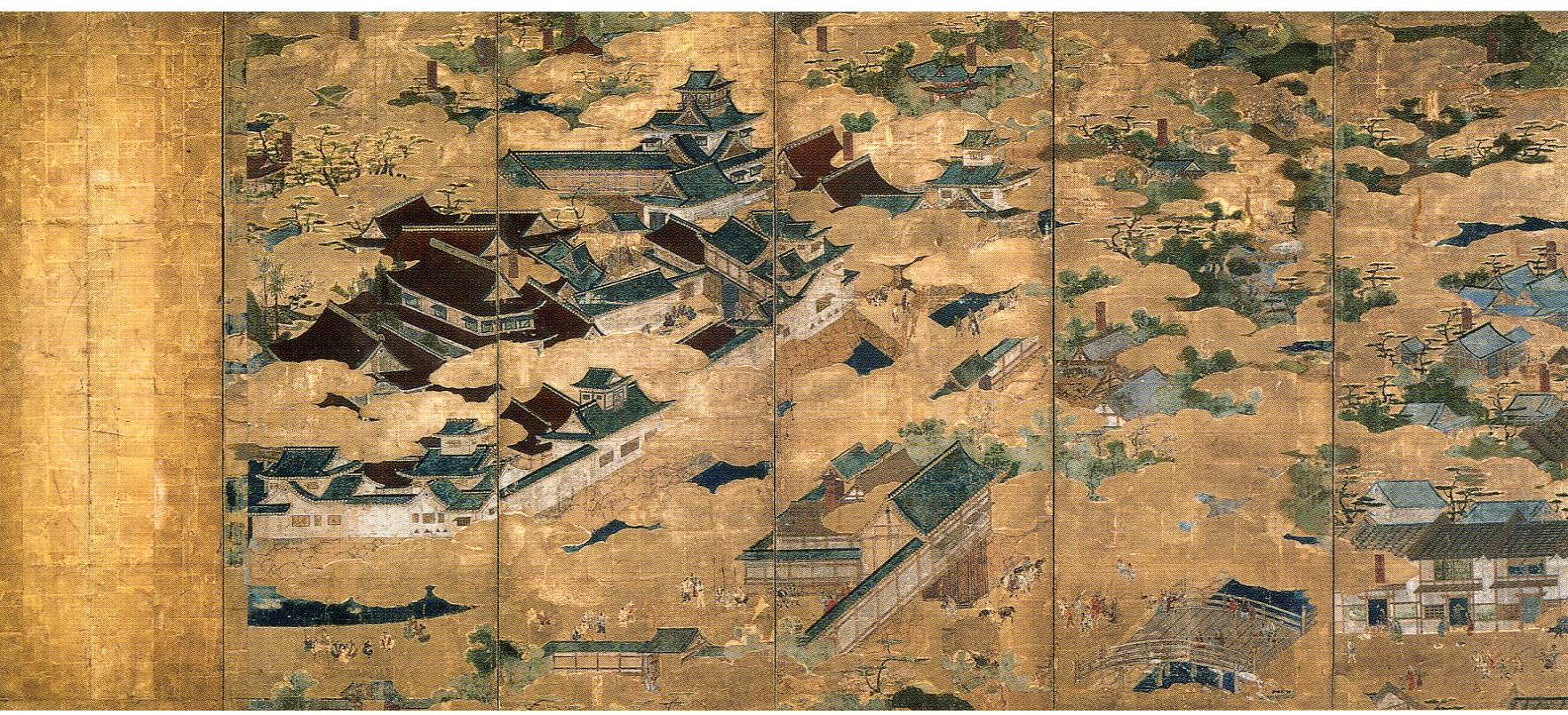
Screen painting of Jurakudai

The Jurakudai or Jurakutei (聚樂第/聚楽第) was a palace constructed at the order of Toyotomi Hideyoshi in Kyoto, Japan.

== History ==
Construction began in 1586, when Hideyoshi had taken the post of Kampaku, and required nineteen months to complete. Its total area was almost equal to the Imperial Palace Enclosure. It was decorated exceptionally lavishly, but had thick walls and a moat more reminiscent of fortresses such as that at Osaka. It was located in present-day Kamigyō, on the site where the Imperial palace had stood in the Heian period.

In late 1587, following the Jurakudai's completion, Hideyoshi moved there from his castle at Osaka, just after his victory over the Shimazu family in Kyūshū. He made it the base for his administration and invited Go-Yōzei, the reigning emperor, to stay there in the first month of 1588. Maeda Geni, one of his Five Commissioners, studied previous receptions of emperors and the requisite protocols. The emperor was escorted by many Court nobles, mounted samurai (including Hideyoshi's foremost generals), and "innumerable men at arms". Hideyoshi rode immediately afterwards, the highest ranking Court official in his capacity as Kampaku. Within the Jurakudai itself, the great daimyō awaited the emperor, most importantly Tokugawa Ieyasu and Oda Nobukatsu. The emperor stayed in the palace for five days, and the daimyō gathered there were asked to sign an oath to the following principles:

1. "We who are assembled here weep tears of gratitude for the presence of His Majesty."
2. "If any evil persons should attempt to confiscate Crown estates or the property of Court nobles, we will take action against them, and we bind ourselves and our descendants to carry out this undertaking."
3. "We swear that we will obey the commands of the Regent down to the smallest particular."

Kusunoki Masatora is the source for these events, having recorded them in his diary.

In 1589, the most important Court nobles and daimyō were again invited to the Jurakudai. Here Hideyoshi displayed a vast amount – approximately 5.5 tonnes (6.1 tons) – of gold and silver heaped on plates; it was then distributed among those gathered.

When Hideyoshi resigned from the post of Kanpaku in 1591, his nephew Toyotomi Hidetsugu assumed the position; he took up residence at Jurakudai with Hideyoshi's other nephew, Toyotomi Hidekatsu. Hidetsugu hosted a second visit for Go-Yōzei. However, Hideyoshi began to construct his new castle in 1594 and when Hidetsugu was forced to commit seppuku in 1595, the Jurakudai was dismantled, with many parts being moved to Fushimi and reassembled.

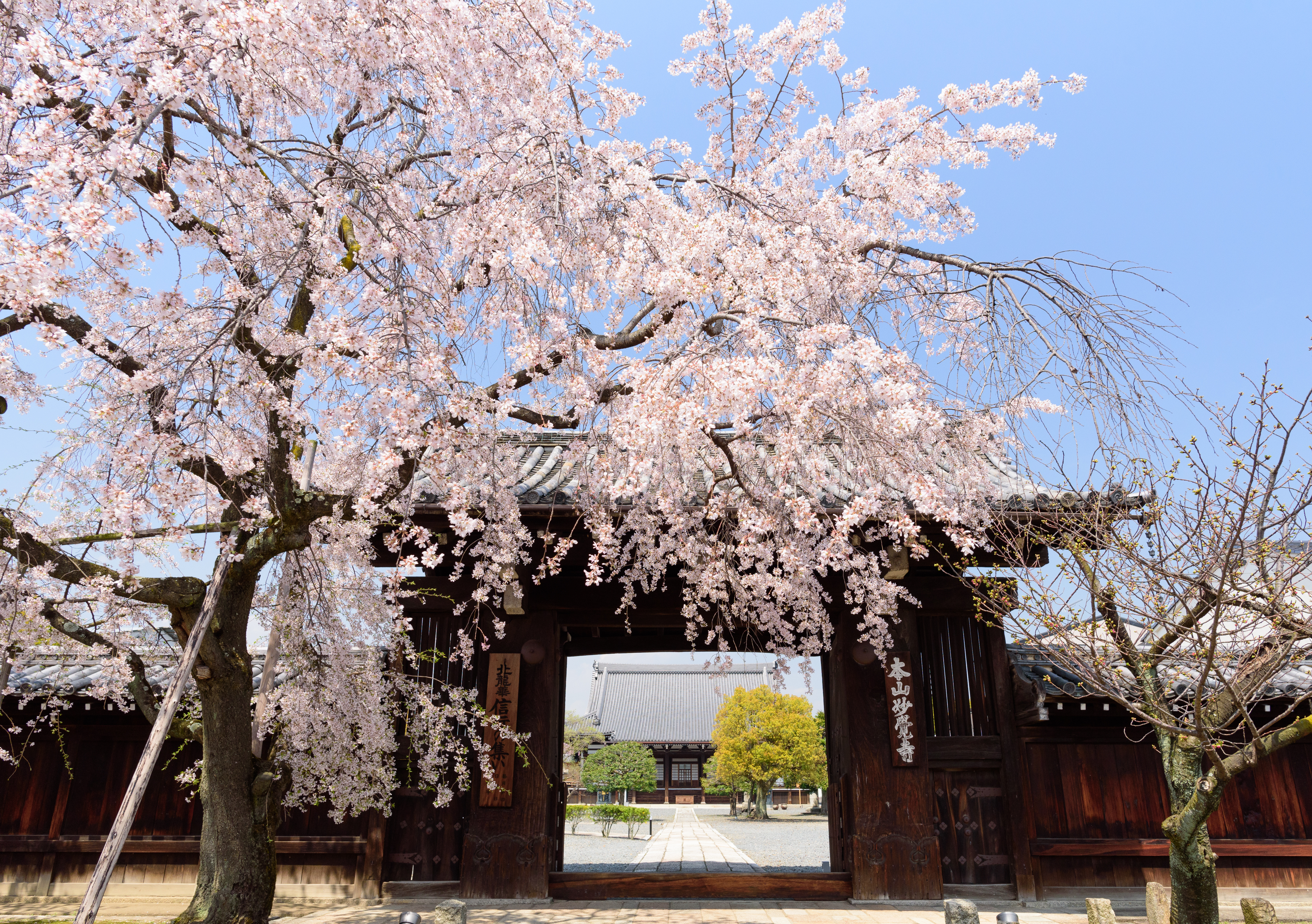
Front gate of Myōkaku-ji

Some buildings of the Jurakudai survive, among them the Hiun-kaku at Nishi Hongan-ji, the Karamon at Daitoku-ji, and the front gate at Myōkaku-ji (all in Kyoto). Recent excavations have yielded some tiles bearing gold leaf.

== See also ==
- Golden Tea Room
