= Hotta clan =

Hotta 堀田
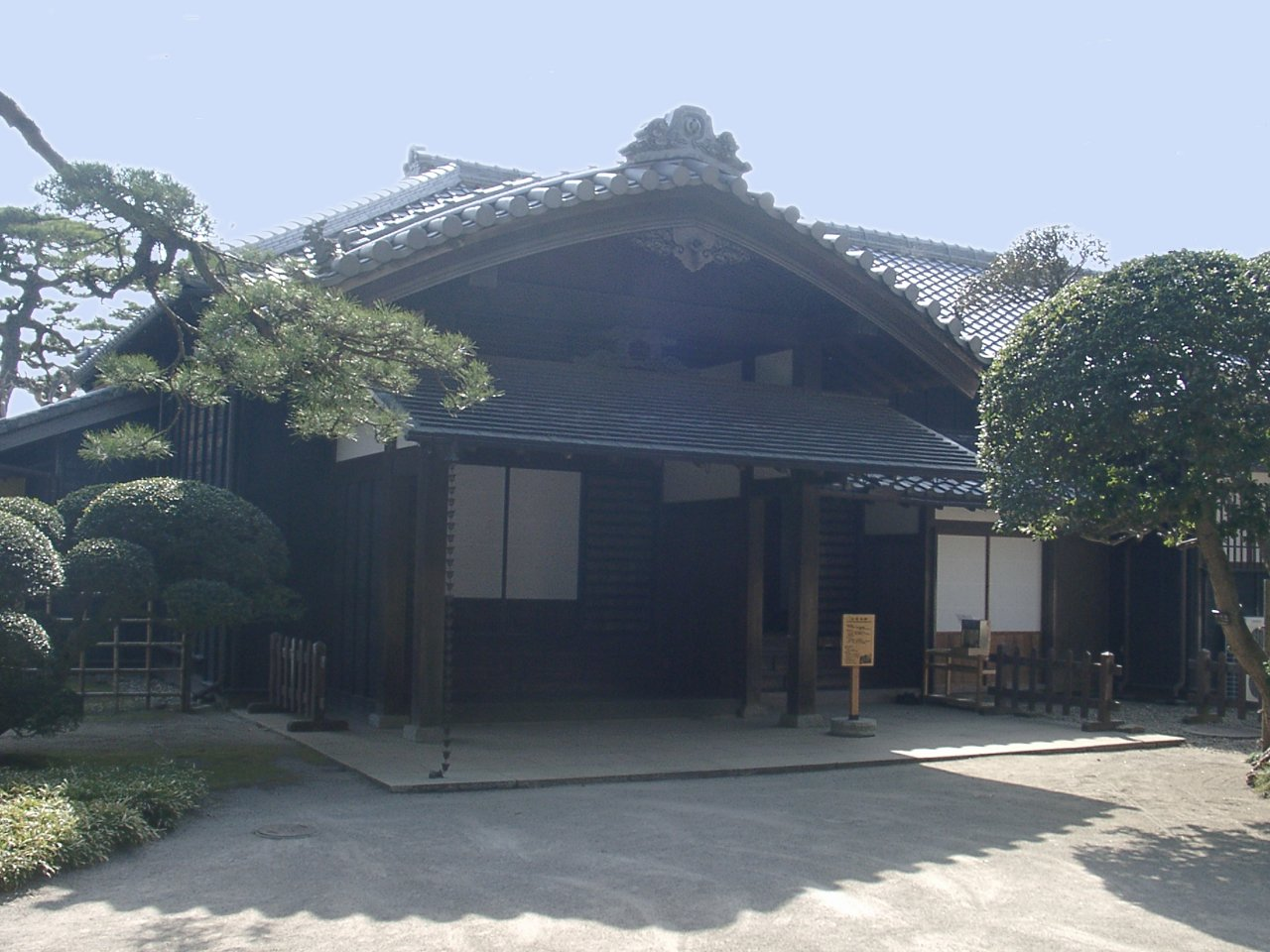
- The historic household of the Hotta clan
- Home province: Shimosa

The Hotta clan (堀田氏, Hotta-shi) was a Japanese clan that ruled the Sakura Domain in Shimosa Province in the late Edo period. Jindai-ji in the present-day city of Sakura was the clan's bodaiji, or family temple, and has many of the tombstones of prominent members of the Hotta clan.
