= History of China–Japan relations =

Overview of the history of China-Japan relations

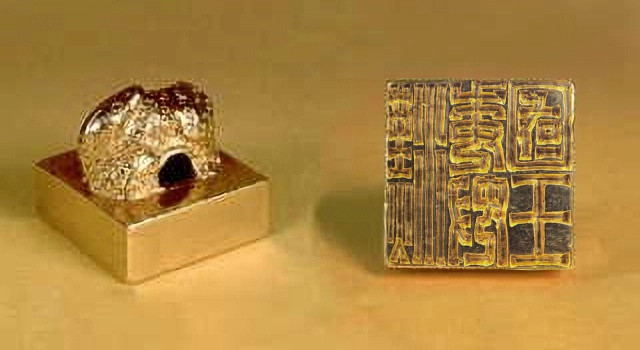
Composite image showing two views of the King of Na gold seal, which was bestowed upon Japan by China in 57 AD. It was discovered in 1784 on Shikanoshima Island in Fukuoka Prefecture, Japan.

The history of China–Japan relations spans thousands of years through trade, cultural exchanges, friendships, and conflicts. Japan has deep historical and cultural ties with China; cultural contacts throughout its history have strongly influenced the nation – including its writing system, (Note: See also: Kanji and Kanbun.) architecture, (Note: See also: East Asian hip-and-gable roof.) cuisine, (Note: See also: Japanese Chinese cuisine and Ramen, which uses Chinese noodles.) culture, literature, religion, (Note: See also: Confucianism.) philosophy, and law. China, in return, has been deeply influenced by Japan.

The first mention of the Japanese archipelago was in the Chinese historic text Book of the Later Han, in the year 57, in which it was noted that the Han dynasty gave a golden seal to Wa. During the Sui dynasty and Tang dynasty, Japan sent many students on a limited number of Imperial embassies to China. In 663 the Battle of Baekgang took place, the first China–Japan conflict in recorded history. Japan sought ties with China after the fall of the Paekche, with whom Japan was closely allied. Trade began with the two nations, and important elements were brought back from China, including Buddhist teachings, Chinese customs and culture, bureaucracy, architecture and city planning. Japan attempted to invade Korea in the 16th century, but was defeated by Joseon and the Ming dynasty. Direct trade with China was limited by the Tokugawa shogunate after 1633, when Japan decided to close all direct links with the foreign world.

Large-scale trade between the two nations began in the 1860s. After old Tokugawa shogunate was overthrown during the Meiji Restoration, Japan rapidly modernized and started to see the Qing dynasty as weak. Japan achieved victory in the First Sino-Japanese War of 1894–95, forcing China to sign the Treaty of Shimonoseki, forcing China to recognize the independence of Korea and cede Taiwan and the Penghu Islands to Japan. Japanese troops participated in the suppression of the Boxer Rebellion in 1900. Many Chinese students had also studied in Japan and was also used as a base by Chinese political activists to overthrow the imperial Qing dynasty in 1912. Following the outbreak of the First World War in 1914, Japan occupied the German colony of Qingdao and secretly demanded extensive concessions from China. Though forced to back down, Japan provided financial support to China through the Nishihara Loans, and pressured China into signing the secret Sino-Japanese Joint Defence Agreement in 1918. in 1919, China was refused a return of the former German concessions, leading to the May Fourth Movement.

In 1931, the Japanese army staged the Mukden Incident, using it as justification to invade northeast China and establish the puppet state Manchukuo. Between 1931 and 1937 there were intermittent clashes. In July 1937, the conflict escalated after the Marco Polo Bridge incident, marking the beginning of the Second Sino-Japanese War. Japan made rapid territorial advancements in China and committed numerous war crimes, including the Nanjing Massacre and Unit 731. After the defeat of Japan in 1945, China regained all lost territories. After the establishment of the People's Republic of China in 1949, relations were tense, with Japan continuing to recognize the Republic of China based in Taiwan. Japan established diplomatic relations with the PRC in 1972. Since then, trade has expanded greatly between the two nations and despite geopolitical disagreements are generally at peace with each other.

== First evidence of Japan in Chinese historical records AD 1–300 ==
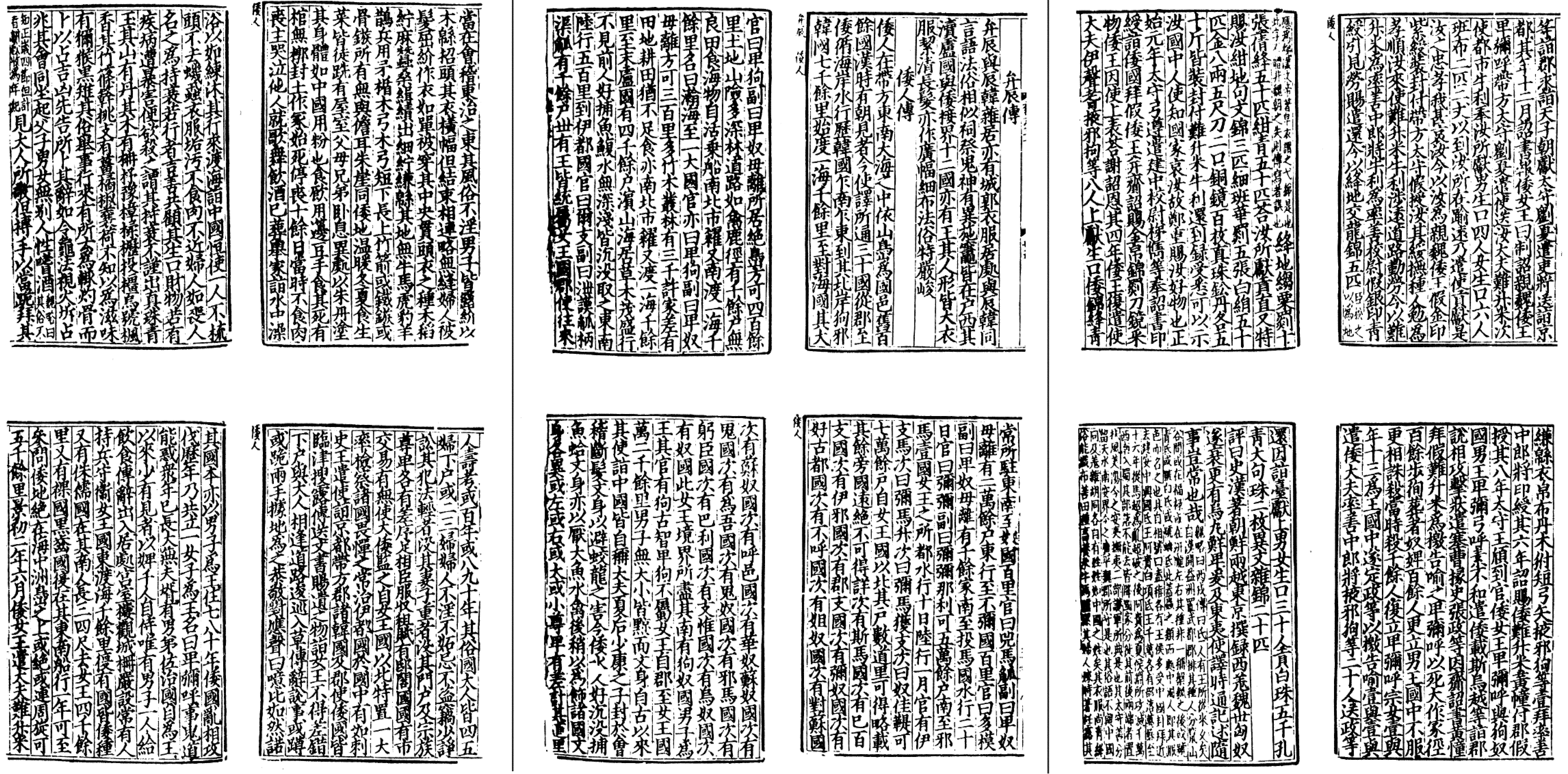
Text of the Wei Zhi (c. 297)

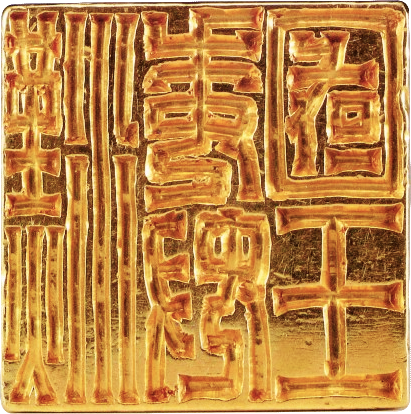
The King of Na gold seal: Base (left), together with its imprint (right). The imprint is read from right to left, top to bottom.

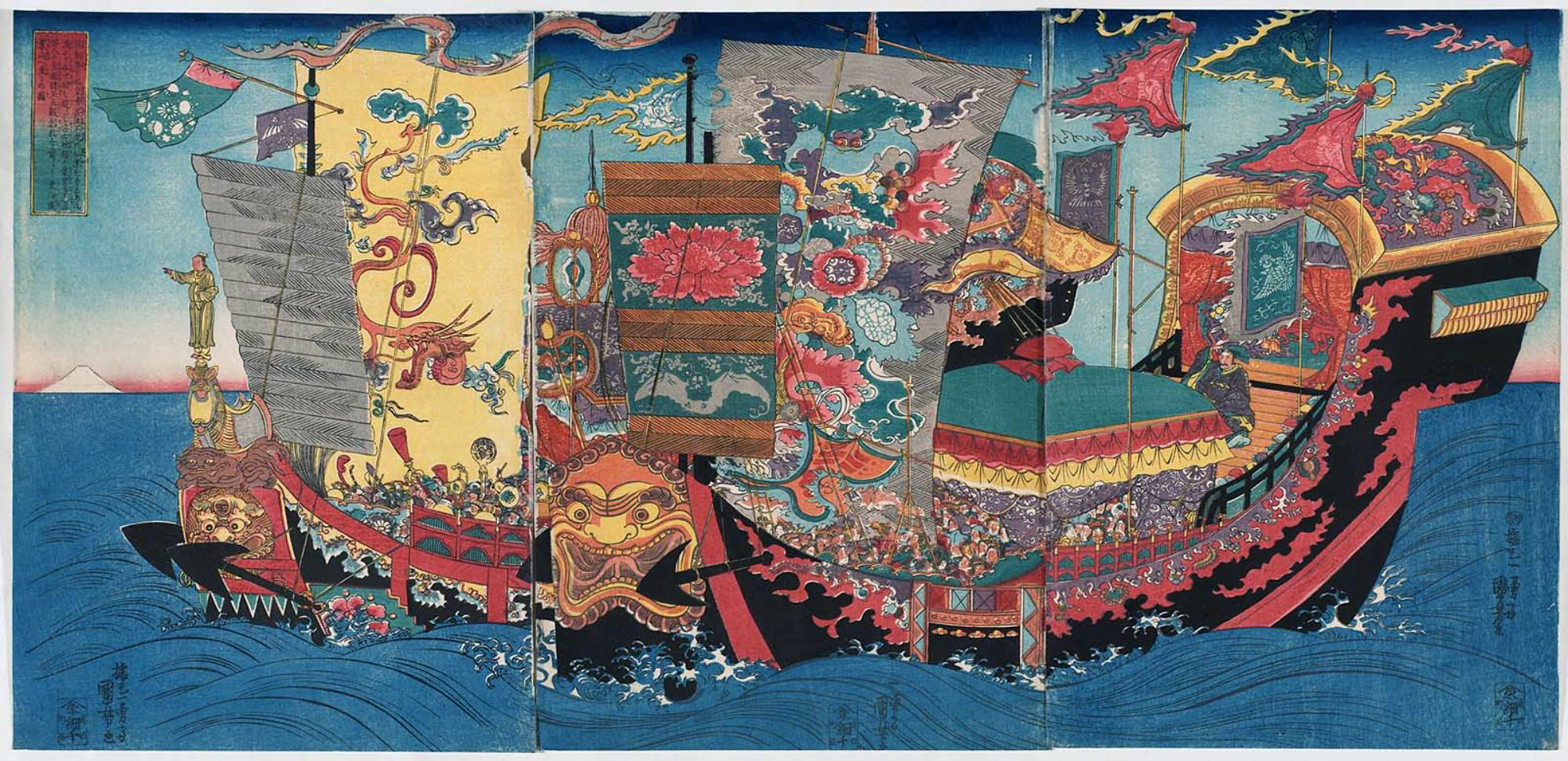
The expedition of Xu Fu in search of the medicine for immortality. Kuniyoshi, c. 1843

The first mention of the Japanese archipelago was in the Chinese historic text Book of the Later Han, in the year 57, in which it was noted that the Emperor of the Han dynasty gave a golden seal to Wa (Japan). The King of Na gold seal was discovered in northern Kyūshū in the eighteenth century. From then on Japan was repeatedly recorded in Chinese historical texts, at first sporadically, but eventually continuously as Japan matured into a notable power in the region.

There is a Chinese tradition that the first Chinese Emperor, Qin Shi Huang, sent several hundred people to Japan to search for medicines of immortality. Xu Fu was sent by Qin Shi Huang to the eastern seas twice to look for the elixir of life. His two journeys occurred between 219 BC and 210 BC. It was believed that the fleet included 60 barques with soldiers, ship crewmen, and 3,000 boys and 3,000 girls, and craftsmen of different fields. During the third century, Chinese travelers reported that inhabitants of Japan claimed ancestry from Wu Taibo, a king of the Wu state (located in modern Jiangsu and Zhejiang) during the Warring States era. They recorded examples of Wu traditions including ritual teeth-pulling, tattooing and carrying babies on backs. Other records at the time show that Japan already had the same customs recognized today. These include clapping during prayers, eating from wooden trays and eating raw fish (also a traditional custom of Jiangsu and Zhejiang before pollution made this impractical). Kofun era traditions appear in the records as the ancient Japanese built earthen mound tombs.

The first Japanese personage mentioned by the Wei Zhi (Records of Wei) is Himiko, the female shaman leader of a country with hundreds of states called Yamataikoku. Modern historical linguists believe Yamatai was actually pronounced Yamato.

== Introduction of Chinese political system and culture in Japan AD 600–900 ==
During the Sui dynasty and Tang dynasty, Japan sent many students on a limited number of Imperial embassies to China, to help establish its own footing as a sovereign nation in northeast Asia. After the fall of the Korean confederated kingdom of Baekje (with whom Japan was closely allied) to combined Tang and Silla forces, Japan was forced to seek out the Chinese state on its own, which in those times was a treacherous undertaking, thus limiting the successes of Japanese overseas contacts during this time.

Important elements brought back from China (and some which were transmitted through Baekje to Japan) included Buddhist teachings, Chinese customs and culture, bureaucracy, architecture and city planning. The Japanese kimono is very similar to the clothing of the Tang dynasty, and many historians believe that the Japanese started wearing robes like what Tang royalty wore, eventually adapting the garb to match Japanese culture. The capital city of Kyoto was also planned according to Feng Shui elements from the Chinese capital of Chang'an. During the Heian period, Buddhism became one of the major religions, alongside Shinto.

The use of the Chinese model of Imperial government ceased by the tenth century, overtaken by traditional Japanese clan and family rivalries (Soga–Mononobe, Taira–Minamoto).

== First recorded China–Japan battle ==
In AD 663 the Battle of Baekgang took place, the first China–Japan conflict in recorded history. The battle was part of the ancient relationships between the Korean Three Kingdoms, the Japanese Yamato, and Chinese dynasties. The battle itself came near the conclusion of this period with the fall of Baekje, one of the three Korean kingdoms, coming on the heels of this battle.

The background of that large battle involves Silla (one of the Korean kingdoms) trying to dominate the Korean Peninsula by forging an alliance with the Tang dynasty, who were trying to defeat Goguryeo, an ongoing conflict that dated back to the Sui dynasty. At the time, Goguryeo was allied to Baekje, the third major Korean kingdom. Yamato Japan supported Baekje earnestly with 30,000 troops and sending Abe no Hirafu, a seasoned general who fought the Ainu in campaigns in eastern and northern Japan. As part of Silla's efforts to conquer Baekje, the battle of Baekgang was fought between Tang China, Baekje, Silla, and Yamato Japan.

The battle itself was a catastrophic defeat for the Yamato forces. Some 300 Yamato vessels were destroyed by a combined Silla–Tang fleet of half the number of ships, and thus the aid to Baekje from Yamato could not help on land, having been defeated at sea. Baekje fell shortly thereafter, in the same year.

Once Baekje was defeated, both Silla and Tang focused on the more difficult opponent, Goguryeo, and Goguryeo fell in 668 AD. For the most part, Silla, having been rivals with Baekje, also was hostile to Yamato Japan, which was seen as a brother state to Baekje, and this policy continued (with one pause between roughly AD 670–730) after Silla united most of what is now Korea and repelled Tang China from what is now the Korean peninsula. Yamato Japan was left isolated for a time and found itself having to forge ties with mainland Asia on its own, having had the most safe and secure pathway obstructed by a hostile Silla.

== The prosperities of maritime trading 600–1600 ==
Marine trades between China and Japan are well recorded, and many Chinese artifacts could be excavated. Baekje and Silla sometimes played the role of middleman, while direct commercial links between China and Japan flourished.

After 663 (with the fall of allied Baekje) Japan had no choice (in the face of hostility from Silla, which was temporarily deferred in the face of Tang imperialism – as Tang imperialism posed a threat both to Japan and unified Silla – but resumed in after 730 or so) but to directly trade with the Chinese dynasties. At first the Japanese had little long-range seafaring expertise of their own but eventually (some suggest with the aid of Baekje expatriates who fled their country when it fell) the Japanese improved their naval prowess as well as the construction of their ships.

The ports of Ningbo and Hangzhou had the most direct trading links to Japan and had Japanese residents doing business. The Ming dynasty decreed that Ningbo was the only place where Japanese–Chinese relations could take place. Ningbo, therefore, was the destination of many Japanese embassies during this period. After going into Ningbo they then went to other cities in China. In 1523, two rival embassies were sent to Ningbo by Japan, then in a state of civil war known as the Sengoku period. One of the emissaries was a Chinese, Song Suqing, who had moved to Japan earlier. A hundred Japanese monks visited in the fifteenth and sixteenth centuries, visiting, making contact with Chinese literati in Ningbo, Beijing, Hangzhou, Suzhou, Nanjing, the valley of the Huai and Tianjin. Song Suqing became involved in a disagreement with a rival Japanese trade delegation, which led to the Ningbo incident where the Japanese pillaged and plundered in the vicinity of Ningbo before escaping in stolen ships, defeating a Ming pursuing flotilla on the way. In retaliation the port of Ningbo was closed to the Japanese and two more Japanese missions were received (in 1540 and 1549) until the end of the Ming dynasty. Direct trade with China was limited by the Tokugawa shogunate after 1633, when Japan decided to close all direct links with the foreign world, with the exception of Nagasaki which had Dutch and Chinese trading posts. Some trading was also conducted by the Shimazu clan of Satsuma province through the Ryukyu Islands and with the Ainu of Hokkaido.

== Japanese piracy on China's coasts and Mongol invasions 1200–1600 ==
Japanese pirates (or Wokou) were a constant problem, not only for China and Korea, but also for Japanese society, from the thirteenth century until Hideyoshi's failed invasions of Korea at the end of the sixteenth century. Japanese pirates were often from the undesirable parts of Japanese society, and the Japanese were just as happy to be (for the most part) rid of them as they were raiding more prosperous shores (at the time, Japan was ravaged by civil wars, and so while Korea, China, and the Mongol Empire were enjoying relative peace, prosperity, and wealth, the Japanese were upon hard times).

== Ming dynasty during Hideyoshi's Korean invasions of 1592–1598 ==
Toyotomi Hideyoshi was one of the three unifiers of Japan (Oda Nobunaga and Tokugawa Ieyasu were the others). After subduing the Mōri and Shimazu clans, Hideyoshi had the dream of eventually conquering China but needed to cross through Korea.

When Hideyoshi received refusals to his demands by Korea to cross the country to Ming-dynasty China, he invaded Korea. In the first year of invasion in 1592, the Japanese reached as far as Manchuria under Katō Kiyomasa and fought the Jianzhou Jurchens. Seonjo (Korean king) requested aid from the Ming dynasty, but since Japanese advances were so fast, only small Ming forces were initially committed. Konishi Yukinaga, who garrisoned in Pyongyang in winter 1592, first encountered and defeated a force of 5,000 Chinese soldiers. In 1593, greater Chinese participation under General Li Rusong with an army of 45,000 took Pyongyang with artillery and drove the Japanese to the south, but the Japanese forces defeated them at the Battle of Byeokjegwan.

After 1593, there was a truce of about four years. During that time, Ming granted Hideyoshi the title as "King of Japan" as withdrawal conditions, but Hideyoshi felt it insulted the Emperor of Japan and demanded concessions including the daughter of the Wanli emperor. Further relations soured and war reignited. The second invasion was far less successful for Hideyoshi. The Chinese and Koreans were much more prepared and quickly confined and besieged the Japanese in the south until they were finally driven to the sea and defeated by the Korean admiral Yi Sun Shin. The invasion was a failure but severely damaged the Korean cities, culture and countryside with huge civilian casualties (the Japanese massacred civilians in captured Korean cities). The invasions also drained Ming China's treasury and left it weak against the Manchus, who eventually destroyed the Ming dynasty and created the Qing dynasty in 1644.

Afterwards, Japan, under the Tokugawa shogunate adopted a policy of isolationism until forced open by Commodore Perry in the 1850s.

In the Tokugawa period, considerable trade occurred between China and Japan. China and Japan conducted this trade both directly and indirectly via Ryukyu.

== Ming and Qing dynasties and Edo period Tokugawa Japan ==
Chinese dishes, delicacies, sweets, and candies were introduced to Japan by Chinese men, who taught their Japanese girlfriends how to make them. In the Genroku era (1688–1704) a Chinese instructed his girlfriend on how to make plum blossom-shaped sugar and rice flour soft sweet called "kōsakō." The songs were sung in the Tōsō-on The Kagetsu Entertainment (Kagetsu yokyō) booklet contained information about songs the Chinese men taught to their Japanese girlfriends showing that they were sung in Tōsō-on with instruments like hugong (two-stringed violin), chixianchin (seven-stringed dulcimer), and yuechin (lute). The Japanese women of Nagasaki were taught dance, songs, and music of Chinese origin. The gekkin (yuechin) were used to play these Kyūrenhwan songs. The Kankan-Odori dance accompanied one of these songs which spread in Edo and Kyōto as it gained fame. Exhibitions of the original Chinese style dance were performed in Edo by arranging for the sending of Nagasaki officials managing Chinese affairs and geisha to be sent there by Takahashi Sakuzaemon (1785–1829) who was the court astronomer of the Shogunate. He became famous due to the Siebold Incident. Later on, women were sent to service the Dutch at Dejima after they serviced Chinese at Maruyama being paid for by the Commissioners for Victualing.

== Meiji Restoration and the rise of the Japanese Empire 1868–1931 ==
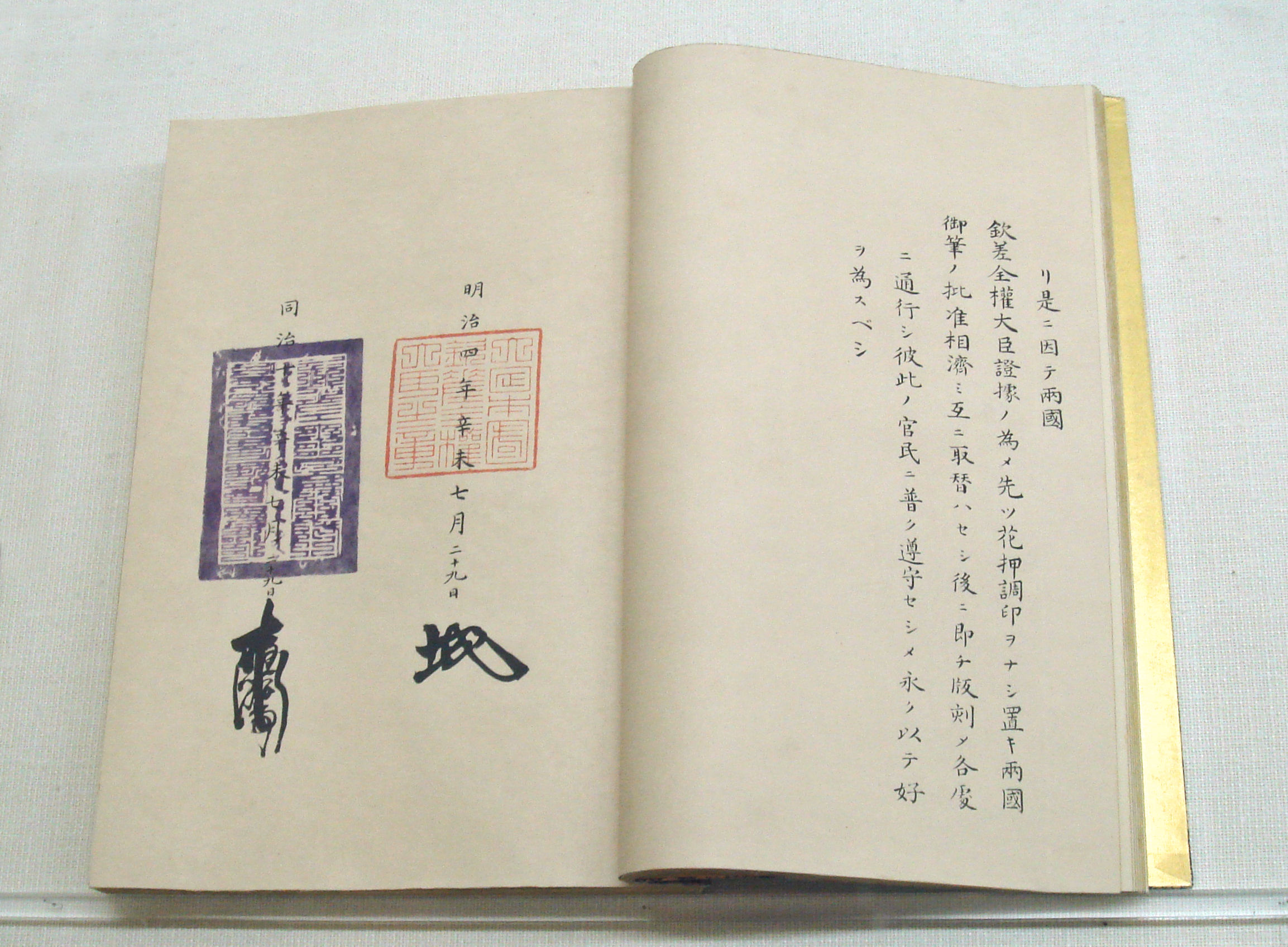
Sino-Japanese Friendship and Trade Treaty of September 13, 1871 signed in Tientsin by Date Munenari and Li Hongzhang.

In 1854 the show of Western naval force by American Commodore Perry led to the Convention of Kanagawa and the opening of Japan to western trading. Senzai Maru's 1862 journey to Shanghai taught Japan the danger of closing off its borders and refusing to change. In the long run it stimulated an expansion of horizons and the need to learn from the outside world. Japanese leaders realized it needed to modernize to avoid the humiliation suffered by China during the First and Second Opium Wars in the 1840s and 1850s. From these lessons, Japan transitioned from isolationism to reformist. After old Tokugawa shogunate was overthrown during the Meiji Restoration in the 1860s Japan initiated structural reforms resulting in rapid modernization, industrialization, militarization and imperialism modeled after the imperialistic Western powers.

China's Manchu leaders meanwhile did not learn comparable lessons. China's communications with the outside world were dramatically transformed in 1871 when the Great Northern Telegraphic Company opened cables linking Shanghai to Hong Kong, Singapore, Nagasaki, and Vladivostok, with connections to India and Europe. The first landline telegraph opened between Shanghai and Tianjin in 1881. China's first modern commercial treaty with Japan was signed on the basis of equality in 1871. As part of its diplomatic opening China established legations in Tokyo, London, Berlin, Washington, Madrid, and St. Petersburg in 1877–1880. Everyone carried optimistic expectations of highly profitable trade with China's hundreds of millions of consumers. It did not happen. By 1890 the total value of all Chinese imports and exports combined was only £50 million, less than many smaller countries. China was too poor, too self-sufficient, too lacking in railways for profitable trade relationships.

=== Conflict after 1880 ===
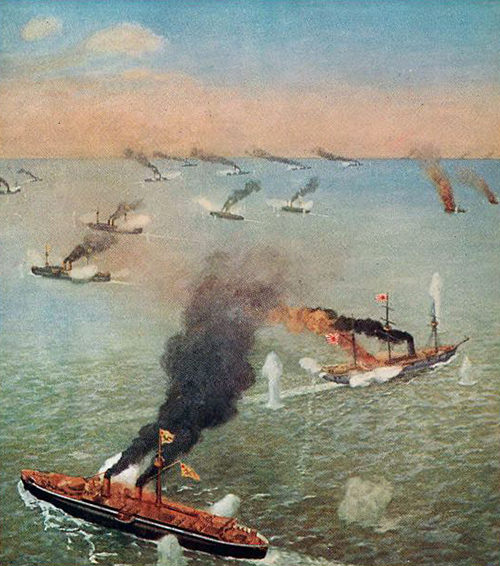
Battle of the Yalu River (1894)

As Japan modernized and built a strong economy and military, friction more and more often arose with China. Hot spots included the Ryukyu Islands, Formosa (Taiwan), and Korea. Japan, having built up a stable political and economic system with a small but well-trained army and navy, and far superior technology, surprised the world with its easy victory in the First Sino-Japanese War of 1894–95. Japanese soldiers massacred the Chinese after capturing Port Arthur on the Liaotung Peninsula. In the Treaty of Shimonoseki of April 1895, China was forced to recognize the independence of Korea, and ceded to Japan Taiwan, the Pescadores Islands and the Liaotung Peninsula. China further paid an indemnity of 200 million silver taels, opened five new ports to international trade, and allowed Japan (and other Western powers) to set up and operate factories in these cities. However, Russia, France, and Germany saw themselves disadvantaged by the treaty and in the Triple Intervention forced Japan to return the Liaotung Peninsula in return for a larger indemnity. The only positive result for China came when those factories led the industrialization of urban China, spinning off a local class of entrepreneurs and skilled mechanics.

Japanese troops participated in a coalition of imperialist powers that suppressed the Boxer Rebellion in 1900. The Chinese were again forced to pay another huge indemnity, but Japan was pressured to accept much less by the United States. Rivalries between the Eight-Nation Alliance and the American Open Door Policy prevented China from being carved up into various colonies.

In 1905-1907 Japan made overtures on China to enlarge its sphere of influence to include Fujian. Japan was trying to obtain French loans and also avoid the Open Door Policy. Paris provided loans on condition that Japan respect the Open Door and not violate China's territorial integrity. In the French-Japanese Entente of 1907, Paris secured Japan's recognition of the special interests France possessed in “the regions of the Chinese Empire adjacent to the territories” where they had “the rights of sovereignty, protection or occupation,” which meant the French colonial possessions in Southeast Asia as well as the French spheres of influence in three provinces in southern China—Yunnan, Guangxi, and Guangdong. In return, the French recognized Japan's spheres of influence in Korea, South Manchuria, and Inner Mongolia.

The Japanese government had its own uses for anti-Qing elements using the islands as a base. At different times it treated Sun Yat-sen in four different ways: lending support to his causes, keeping a neutral distance, prodding him to leave Japan, and suppressing his revolutionary inclinations. In the most favorable phases the government provided a base of operations to Sun Yat-sen and other members of the Tongmenghui. Thus it helped them to overthrow the Qing dynasty in 1912 and the establishment of the Republic of China. It also helped Sun's failed efforts to remove president Yuan Shikai in 1915–1916.

=== First World War and 21 Demands ===
A Japanese expeditionary force quickly moved to capture all German possessions in the Pacific upon the outbreak of the First World War in 1914. Japan occupied the German colony of Qingdao, along with occupying portions of Shandong Province. China was financially chaotic, highly unstable politically, and militarily very weak. Its best hope was to attend the postwar peace conference, and hope to find friends who would help block the threats of Japanese expansionism. China declared war on Germany in August 1917 as a technicality to make it eligible to attend the postwar peace conference. Beijing planned to send a combat unit to the Western Front, but never did so. British diplomats were afraid that the U.S. and Japan would displace Britain's leading role as a trading partner with China. They sought to play Japan and the United States against each other, while simultaneously maintaining cooperation among all three nations against Germany.

In January 1915, Japan secretly issued an ultimatum of Twenty-One Demands to the Chinese government. The 21 points demanded immediate control of former German rights, 99 year leases in southern Manchuria, an interest in steel mills, and concessions regarding railways. The fifth set of demands would give Japan a strong voice inside China's government and make China practically a protectorate. China published the demands and the Allies were angry. Washington and London successfully pressured Tokyo to drop the fifth set of demands. However Japan tried to cling to the provision that would put Fujian province in Japan's sphere of influence. The other four sets were accepted by all sides and went into effect. Japan gained very little. It did not take over Fujian, and it lost prestige in Washington and London. Japan provided financial support to Duan Qirui's administration through the Nishihara Loans, and also pressured him into signing the secret Sino-Japanese Joint Defence Agreement in 1918. When these developments leaked to the press, the Chinese public was outraged. While China had a seat at the Paris Peace Conference in 1919, it was refused a return of the former German concessions, and had to continue its long-time concessions to Western powers. China thus refused to sign the Versailles Treaty. A major reaction to this humiliation was a surge in Chinese nationalism expressed in the May Fourth Movement. The Chinese outrage continues into the 21st century.

== Second Sino-Japanese War ==
The 1920s were years in which Japan looked to secure its economic interests through the treaty system, a policy that became unhinged in 1931 when, following the Mukden Incident in Manchuria, the Japanese adopted a more aggressive strategy of colonial annexation. In 1926 at the beginning of the Shōwa period, the Japanese wanted to occupy Manchuria for its resources. Due to the fractious nature of China, the Japanese were able to gain influence in the region through espionage, diplomacy, and use of force. In 1928 the Japanese assassinated Zhang Zuolin, the Chinese warlord who controlled Manchuria. The Japanese army in 1931 staged the Mukden Incident, using it as justification for the full-scale invasion of Manchuria and establishment of a puppet state, Manchukuo.

Between 1931 and the beginning of the Second Sino-Japanese War in 1937 there were intermittent clashes and engagements between Japanese and the various Chinese forces. These engagements were collectively described by the Japanese government as "incidents" to downplay existing tension. This was primarily to prevent the United States deeming the conflict an actual war and thusly placing an embargo upon Japan as per the neutrality acts. The incidents collectively placed pressure on China to sign various agreements to Japan's benefit. These included: the demilitarization of Shanghai, the He–Umezu Agreement, and the Chin–Doihara Agreement. The period was turbulent for the Chinese Nationalists, as it was mired in a civil war with the Chinese Communists and maintained an uneasy truce with remnant warlords, who nominally aligned with Generalissimo Chiang Kai-shek (Jiang Jieshi), following the Northern Expedition. This period also saw the Chinese Nationalists' pursuit in modernizing its National Revolutionary Army, through the assistance of Soviet, and later German, advisors.

China's Kuomintang (KMT) government sought to censor anti-Japanese messages through mechanisms including the 10 June 1935 Directive Urging Citizens to Foster Friendly Relations with Other Nations and the 20 February 1936 Emergency Measures for Maintaining Public Order which prohibited anti-Japanese movements and gave military police the power to arrest leftist activists and anti-Japanese activists.

In July 1937, the conflict escalated after a significant skirmish with Chinese forces at the Marco Polo Bridge. This marked the beginning of the Second Sino-Japanese War. Chinese nationalist forces retaliated by attacking Shanghai. The Battle of Shanghai lasted for several months, concluding with Chinese defeat on November 26, 1937.

Following this battle, Japanese advances continued to the south and west. A contentious aspect of these Japanese campaigns are the war crimes committed against Chinese people. The most infamous example was the Rape of Nanjing, when Japanese forces subjected the population to looting, mass rape, torture, massacres, and other war crimes. Other (less publicized) atrocities were committed during Japanese advances; it is estimated that millions of Chinese civilians were killed. Various attempts to quantify the crimes committed have proved contentious, if not divisive.

From 1938 onwards, the war was marked by Chinese use of guerrilla tactics to stall advances, and retreat to the deep interior where necessary. This eventually limited Japanese advances because of supply-line limitations – the Japanese were unable to adequately control remote areas but they did control practically all the major cities and ports, as well as air space.

== World War II ==
By 1938, the United States increasingly was committed to supporting China and, with the cooperation of Britain and the Netherlands, threatening to restrict the supply of vital materials to the Japanese war machine, especially oil. The Japanese army, after sharp defeats by the Russians, wanted to avoid war with the Soviet Union, even though it would have aided the German war against the USSR. The Navy, increasingly threatened by the loss of its oil supplies, insisted on a decision, warning the alternatives were a high-risk war, Japan might lose, or a certain descent into third-class status and a loss of China and Manchuria. Officially the Emperor made the decision, but he was told by a key civilian official on 5 November 1941:

it is impossible, from the standpoint of our domestic political situation and of our self-preservation, to accept all of the American demands....we cannot let the present situation continue. If we miss the present opportunity to go to war, we will have to submit to American dictation. Therefore, I recognize that it is inevitable that we must decide to start a war against the United States. I will put my trust in what it has been told: namely, that things will go well in the early part of the war; and that although we will experience increasing difficulties as the war progresses, there is some prospect of success.

The Emperor became fatalistic about going to war, as the military assumed more and more control. Prime Minister Fumimaro Konoe was replaced by the war cabinet of General Hideki Tojo (1884–1948), who demanded war. Tōjō had his way and the attack was made on Pearl Harbor in December 1941, as well as British and Dutch strong points. the main American battle fleet was disabled, and in the next 90 days Japan made remarkable advances including the Dutch East Indies, the Philippines, Malaya and Singapore.

Following the attack on Pearl Harbor and the entry of the US into the war, fighting in the Pacific, and Southeast, and Southwest Asia significantly weakened the Japanese.

== Occupation ==
After the atomic bombings of Hiroshima and Nagasaki and the Soviet invasion of Japanese-occupied Manchuria, Japan surrendered. During the American occupation, 1945–1952, American officials under Douglas MacArthur supervised the Japanese government. All foreign relations were controlled by the United States, and all Japanese diplomats abroad were brought home. The Communist party inside Japan was tolerated, and it supported Mao Zedong's side of the civil war underway in China. Mao prevailed in 1949, and the Japanese left opened small-scale contacts with China, especially using labor unions and artistic groups. When Japan surrendered in 1945, six and a half million of its citizens were stranded in Asia and Pacific islands. That included 3.5 million in the military and 3 million civilians. 2.6 million Japanese were in China, including 1.1 million in Manchuria. All of these Japanese citizens were relocated back to Japan over a period of months and even years. However thousands of Japanese technicians were left behind in Northeast China until they were repatriated in 1953. The Chinese Communist Party was based on peasants and used these skilled men to update the technology, train local workers, and rebuild factories, mines, railways, and other industrial sites.

The Republic of China (ROC) administrated Taiwan after Japan's surrender, in accordance with a decision by the Allied Powers at the Cairo Conference in 1943. The ROC moved its central government to Taiwan in December 1949, following the victory of the PRC in the Chinese Civil War. Later, no formal transfer of the territorial sovereignty of Taiwan to the PRC was made in the postwar San Francisco Peace Treaty, and these arrangements were confirmed in the Treaty of Taipei concluded by the ROC and Japan in 1952. At the time, the Taiwanese authorities (the Chinese Nationalist Party, or Kuomintang (KMT)) were recognized by Japan, not communist China (the People's Republic of China, or PRC). As such, the KMT did not accept Japanese reparations only in the name of the ROC government. Later, the PRC also refused reparations in the 1970s. See more details in the section about World War II reparations and the statement by Japanese Prime Minister Tomiichi Murayama (August, 1995). When Japan finally normalized relations with the People's Republic of China in 1972, the Chinese agreed not to pursue the issue of reparations. In 2022, both China and Japan commemorated the 50th anniversary of the normalization of relations between their two nations.

== See also ==
- International relations (1814–1919)
- China–Japan relations, since 1949
- Republic of China–Japan relations
- Zhou's Four Principles
- Economic history of China
- Wasei-kango
