= Uwajima Castle =

- 宇和島城
- Uwajima, Ehime Prefecture, Japan
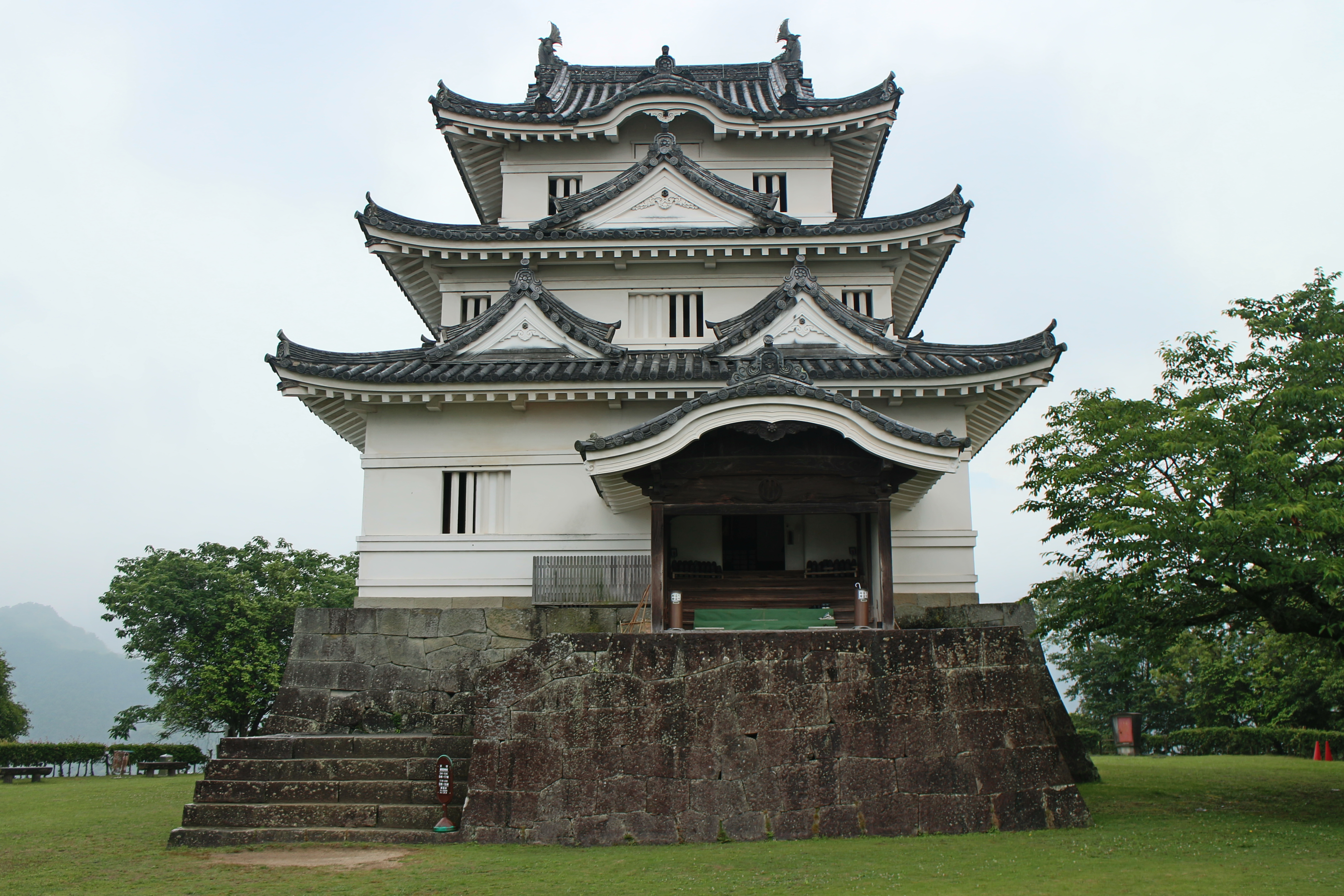
- The original wooden tenshu (keep) of Uwajima Castle

Site information
- Type: Hirayama-style Japanese castle)
- Condition: The tenshu, a few other buildings and some ruins remain.

Location
- Uwajima Castle
- Location within Ehime Prefecture Location within Japan
- Coordinates: 33°13′10.12″N 132°33′54.85″E
- Height: Three stories

Site history
- Built: 1596–1601
- Built by: Tōdō Takatora
- In use: 1601 to 1889
- Materials: Earth, stone, and wood
- Demolished: Most of the castle during the Meiji Restoration, though the tenshu survived.
- National Historic Site of Japan Important Cultural Property

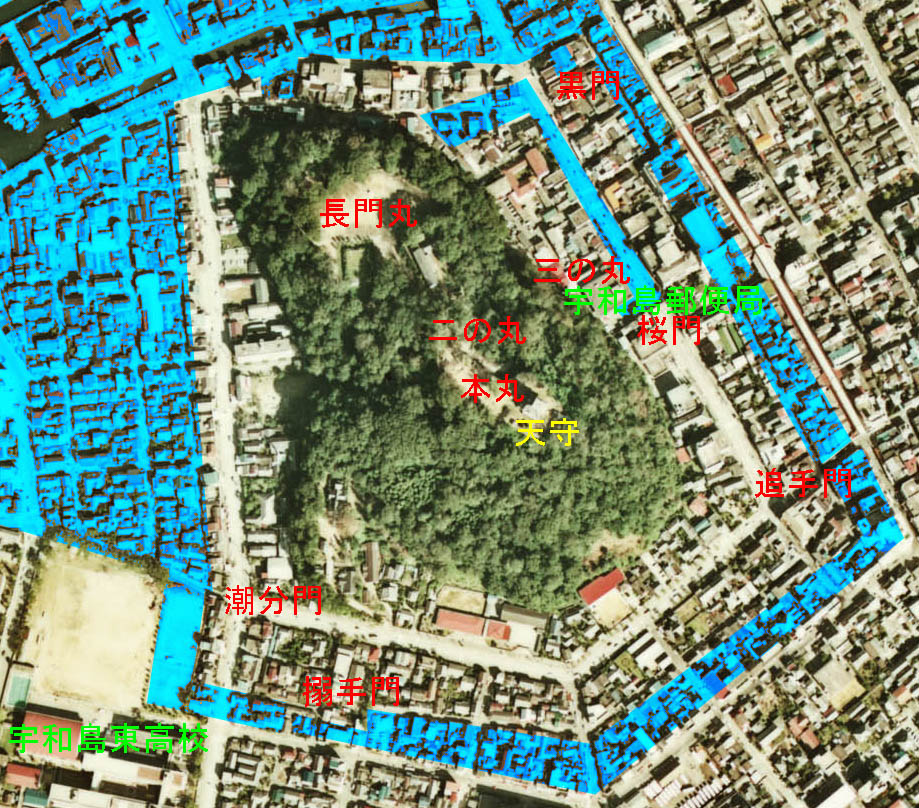
Aerial view of Uwajima Castle

Uwajima Castle (宇和島城, Uwajima-jō) is a hirayama-jiro Japanese castle located in the city of Uwajima, Ehime, Japan. An alternate name for this castle is Tsurushima-jō. The castle is one of twelve Japanese castles to still have its historical tenshu. It has been protected as a National Historic Site since 1937.

== History ==
Uwajima Castle is located on a hill at the center of the city of Uwajima in southern part of former Iyo Province. It was originally built on the seashore, with the ocean forming a natural moat on three sides; however, due to land reclamation it is now in the center of the city. During the Heian period, Uwajima (notably the island of Hiburijima in Uwajima Bay) was center of piracy in the Seto Inland Sea and became the stronghold of Fujiwara no Sumitomo in his rebellion. In 941 Tachibana Tachibana, a guard envoy, set up a fort in this area when suppressing the rebellion, and named the fortification "Itashima Marugushi Castle". During the Muromachi period, a branch of the Saionji family was appointed as governor of the area by the Ashikaga shogunate, but was constantly being invaded his more powerful and aggressive neighbors. The Saionji survived by the fluid loyalties and fierce resistance, but were eventually overcome by Chōsokabe Motochika, who was in turn overthrown by the forces of Toyotomi Hideyoshi.

Iyo Province was given to Kobayakawa Takakage, who assigned the area around Uwajima to his adopted son and half-brother, Hidekane. Takakage was later transferred to Kyushu and was replaced by Hideyoshi's general Toda Katsutaka, who expanded on the minor fortification, transforming it into a Sengoku period castle. Toda, who ruled with extreme harshness, went insane and died during the invasion of Korea without heir. Hideyoshi then assigned Tōdō Takatora to the domain. A noted castle designer, Takatora spent six years re-building the castle, starting in 1601. In 1604 he moved the tenshu of Kagomori Castle to Uwajima Castle and made it the castle's Tsukimi Yagura. Tōdō Takatora retained the original layout of the castle, which had an oblong inner bailey measuring 30 by 100 meters, with the tenshu in the center of the southern portion. He added stone walls and expanded on the surrounding secondary enclosures, adding fortified gate and water moats. The castle was noteworthy in the use of an innovative pentagonal layout of moats and walls, which made it difficult for attackers to attack any one side without having blind spots to their flanks.

Under the Tokugawa shogunate, Uwajima Domain was assigned to Date Hidemune, the eldest son of Date Masamune and head of a cadet branch of the Date clan. The castle was renamed Uwajima Castle around 1617. The castle was severely damage due to an earthquake in 1649. Major repairs and expansion began in 1650, but was not completed until 1671. Date Munetoshi replaced the former tenshu with the current structure in 1666. The castle was severely damaged again in the 1854 Ansei great earthquakes, during which time the tenshu and 24 yagura were damaged and four yagura completely destroyed. Major restoration work continued to 1860. The Date clan continued to rule Uwajima Domain until the Meiji restoration. During the Bakumatsu period, Date Munenari introduced military reforms and built up a western-style army; however, the domain did to participate in the Boshin War and the castle was undamaged.

== Current situation ==
The castle initially escaped the effects of government decrees for the destruction of all former feudal fortifications, but from 1900 to 1913, much of its stone walls and remaining gates and yagura were destroyed with construction work on the expansion of Uwajima Port. In 1934, the tenshu and Otemon (main gate) were designated a National Treasure (国宝) before the 1950 National Treasure Protection Law (文化財保護法施) was enacted, and in 1937 the site received National Historic Site designation. However, the Otemon gate was subsequently destroyed in the final days of World War II by American air raids. In 1949, the Date clan donated the tenshu and remaining grounds of the castle to the city of Uwajima.In 1950, the tenshu was redesignated as a National Important Cultural Property under the current Law for the Protection of Cultural Properties. In 1952, one surviving gate of the castle, the Nagaya Gate, was relocated and reconstructed on the site of the former Otemon. The tenshu was extensively repaired from 1960 to 1962. In 1965, the Nagaya Gate and one other surviving gate, the Noboritachimon gate were designated Uwajima City Tangible Cultural Properties. Further repairs on the stone walls was conducted in 1994.

Uwajima Castle was listed as one of Japan's Top 100 Castles by the Japan Castle Foundation in 2006.

The castle is located a 20-minute walk from JR Shikoku Uwajima Station.

== Cultural Properties ==
The Tenshu (天守) of Uwajima Castle has been protected as an Important Cultural Property since 1934

== Gallery ==
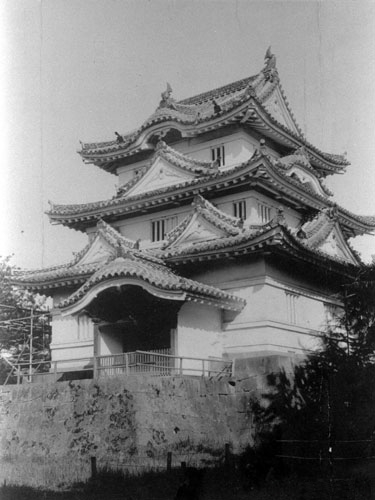
Uwajima Castle keep tower in 1928

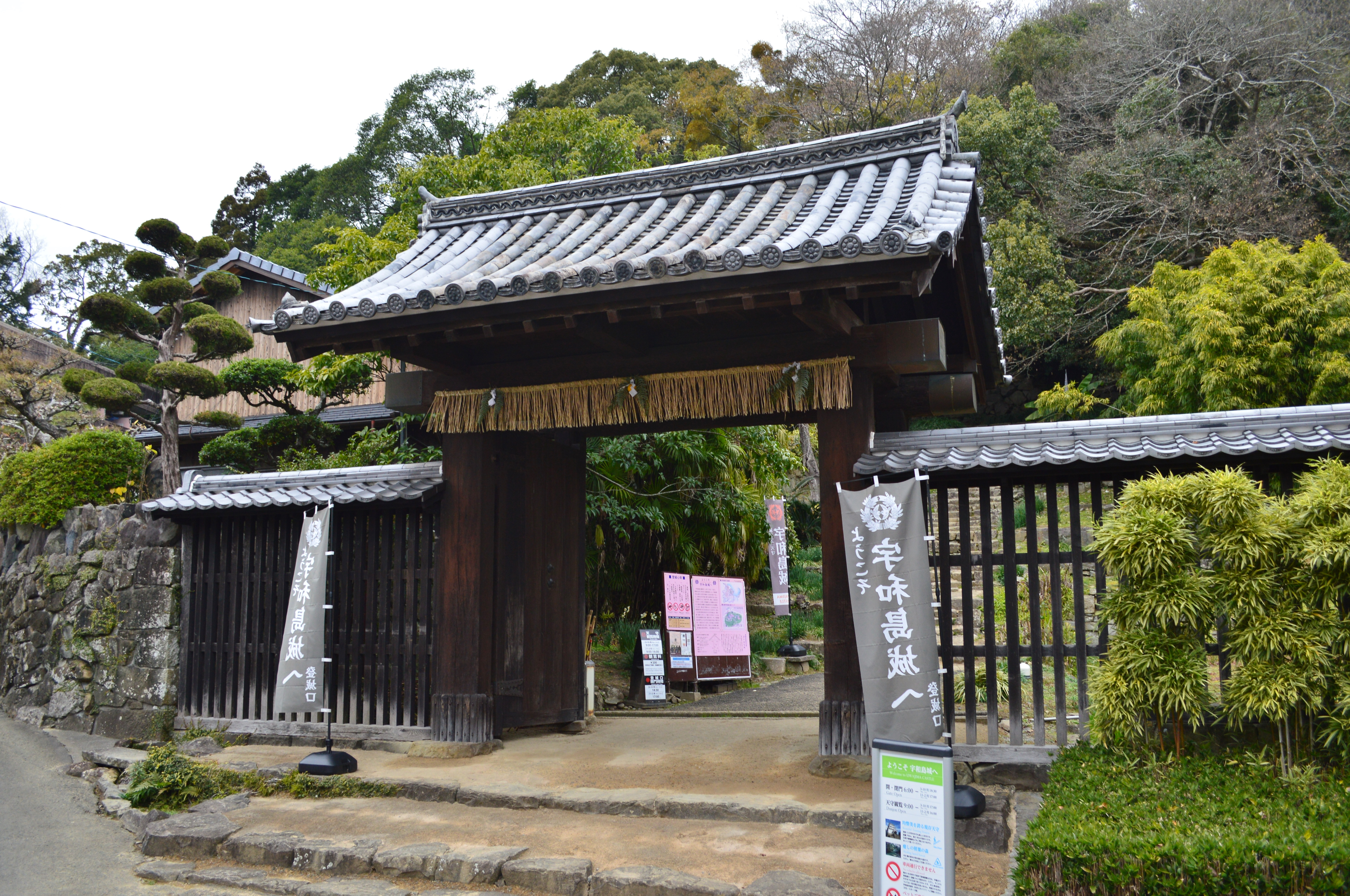
Noboritachimon

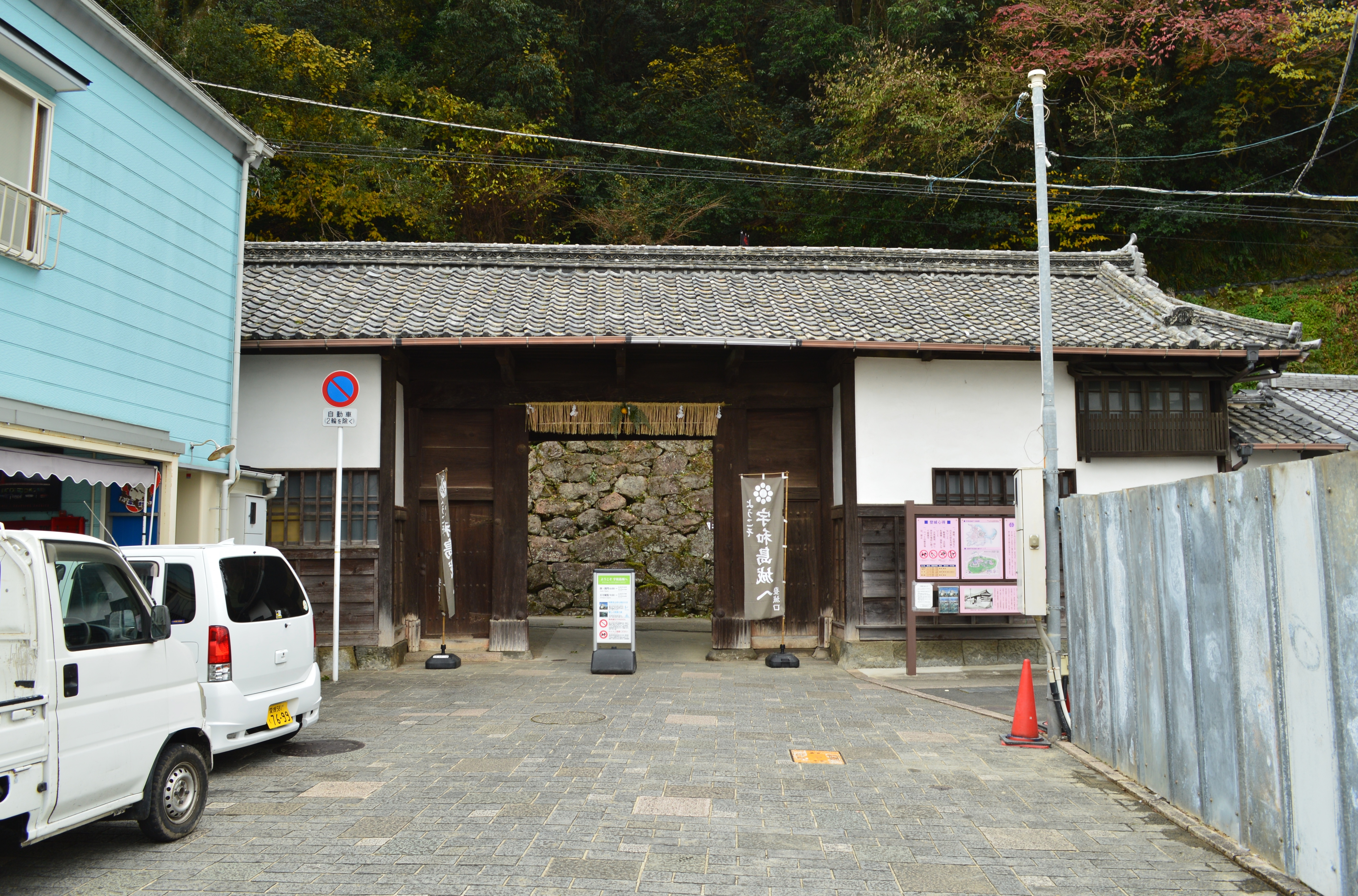
Nagayamon

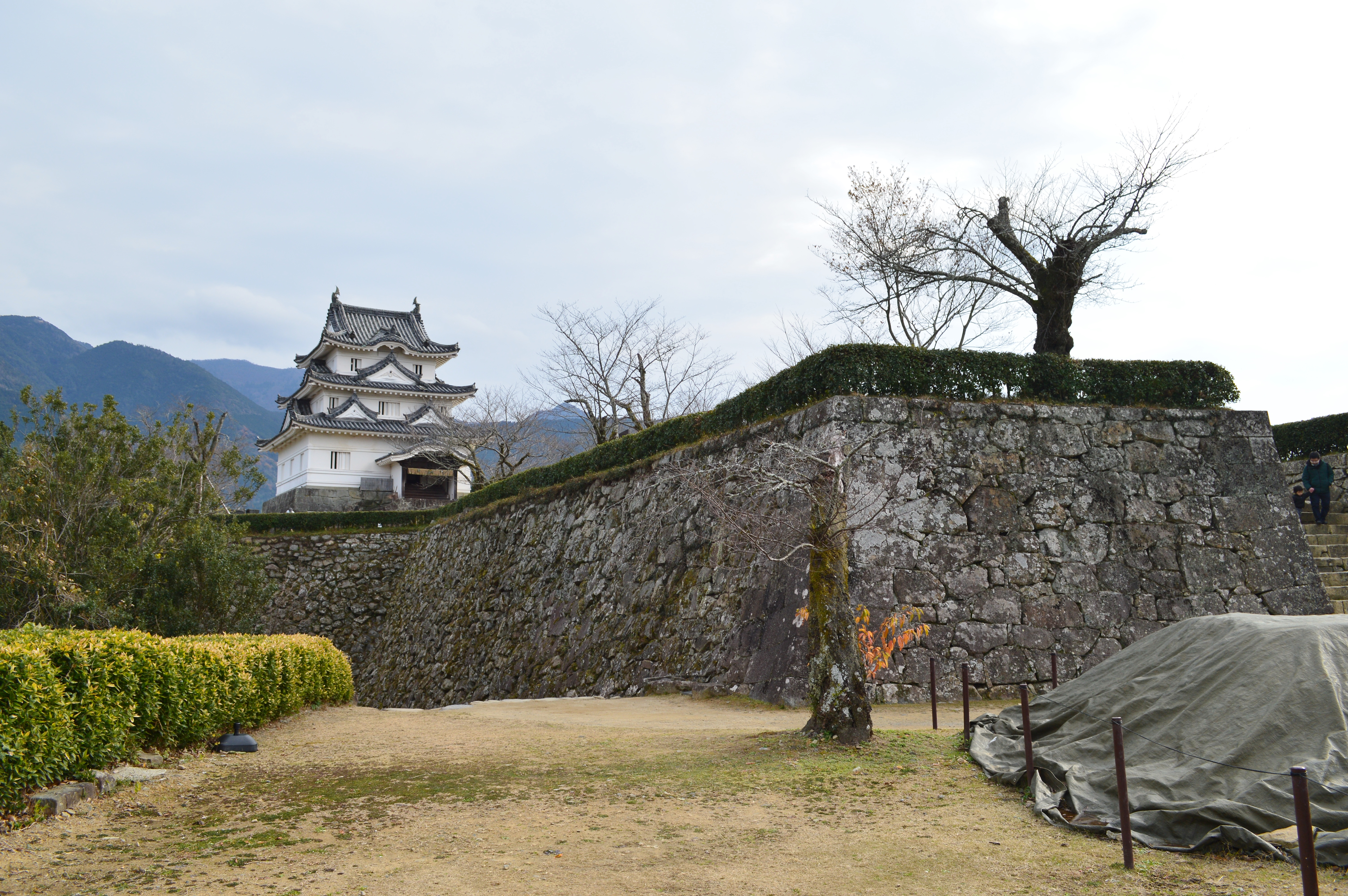
Walls of the inner bailey

== See also ==
- List of Historic Sites of Japan (Ehime)

== Literature ==
- De Lange, William (2021). An Encyclopedia of Japanese Castles. Groningen: Toyo Press. pp. 600 pages. ISBN 978-9492722300.
- Mitchelhill, Jennifer (2013). Castles of the Samurai:Power & Beauty. USA: Kodansha. ISBN 978-1568365121.
- Schmorleitz, Morton S. (1974). Castles in Japan. Tokyo: Charles E. Tuttle Co. ISBN 0-8048-1102-4.
- Motoo, Hinago (1986). Japanese Castles. Tokyo: Kodansha. pp. 200 pages. ISBN 0-87011-766-1.
