= Huaya =

Stylized signature used in parts of Asia

- Kaō of lord Toyotomi Hideyoshi (1537-1598)

Chinese name
- Chinese: 花押
Transcriptions
Standard Mandarin
- Hanyu Pinyin: huāyā

Vietnamese name
- Vietnamese alphabet: hoa áp
- Chữ Hán: 花押

Korean name
- Hangul: 화압
- Hanja: 花押
Transcriptions
- Revised Romanization: Hwaap
- McCune–Reischauer: Hwaap

Japanese name
- Kanji: 花押
- Kana: かおう
Transcriptions
- Romanization: Kaō

Huaya ("flower seal"; Chinese: 花押; pinyin: Huā Yā; Korean: 화압, romanized: Hwaap; Japanese: 花押, romanized: Kaō, Vietnamese: hoa áp, chữ Hán: 花押) are stylized signatures or marks used in East Asian cultures in place of a fully written signature. Originating from China, the huaya was historically used by prominent figures such as government officials, monks, artists, and craftsmen. The use of stamp seals gradually replaced the huaya, though they are still used occasionally in modern times by important people.

== Design ==
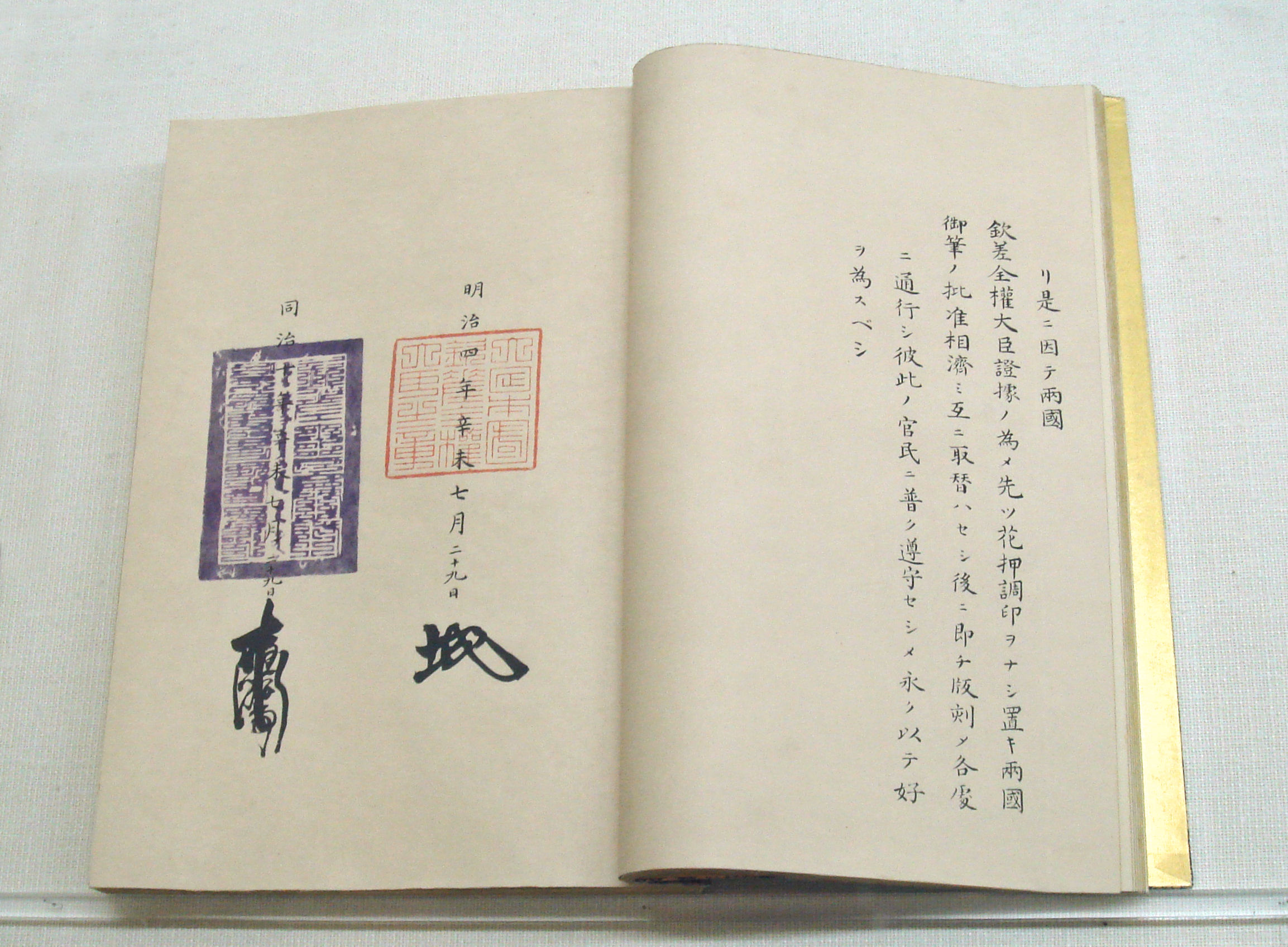
The Sino-Japanese Friendship and Trade Treaty of 1871, showing the marks of general Li Hongzhang (left) and lord Date Munenari (right)

Most huaya are constructed from parts of Chinese characters and resemble them to a certain degree. A small number of early marks, mostly used by Buddhist monks, are simply abstract pictures related to the person's identity.

Generally, one or more of the characters from the person's name is used in creating a huaya. Designs are often taken from highly calligraphic, distorted, or alternative forms of a character, as well as merging parts of two characters into a single mark (similar to a monogram). Descendants of the same family or artistic lineage will often have similar-looking marks.

Several styles of huaya have existed throughout history. Early marks from the Tang (618-907) and Song dynasties (960–1279) were more abstract and minimalistic compared to later designs. During the Ming dynasty (1368-1644), marks with a design between two horizontal lines became popular in China, and was adopted later by the Tokugawa clan in Japan.

== History ==
=== China ===
The oldest surviving record of huaya is in the Book of Northern Qi, the official history of the Northern Qi dynasty (550–577 AD). Huaya reached its peak popularity during the Northern Song dynasty (960-1127). After that, its popularity began to decline.

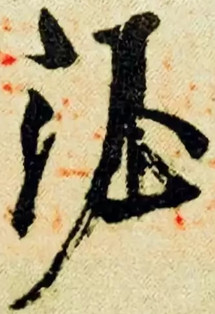
Mark of Emperor Xuanzong of Tang (685-762)

Mark of Emperor Taizu of Song (927-976)

Mark of Emperor Taizong of Song (939–997)

"天下一人" Mark of Emperor Huizong of Song (1082-1135)

Mark of the Hongwu Emperor (1328-1398)

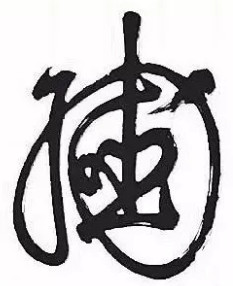
"朱由检" Mark of the Chongzhen Emperor (1611-1644)

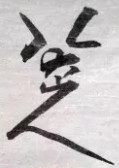
"八大山人" Mark of the painter Bada Shanren (1626–1705)

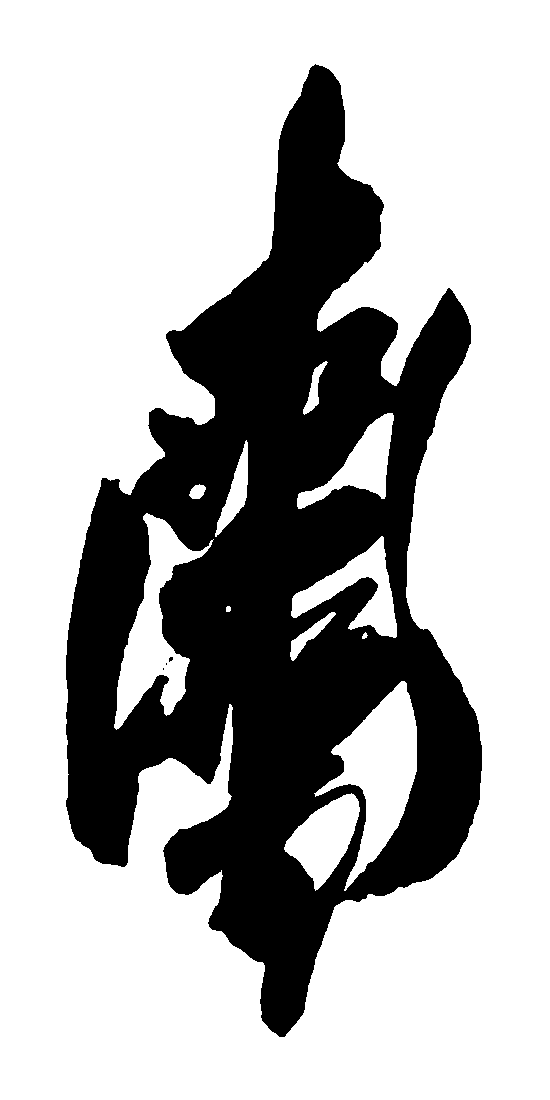
"李鴻章" Mark of general Li Hongzhang (1823-1901)

=== Japan ===
Huaya first spread to Japan during the Heian period (794-1185), where it is called Kaō. Though their use became far less widespread after the Edo period, they continue to be used even by some contemporary politicians and other famous people. The reading and identification of individual kaō often requires specialist knowledge; whole books devoted to the topic have been published.

Mark of Taira no Tadamori (1096–1153)

Mark of shogun Ashikaga Takauji (1305-1358)

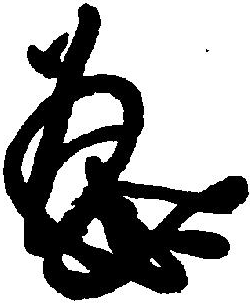
Mark of Emperor Go-Hanazono (1418-1471)

Mark of shogun Tokugawa Ieyasu (1543-1616)

Mark of prime minister Hideki Tojo (1884-1948)

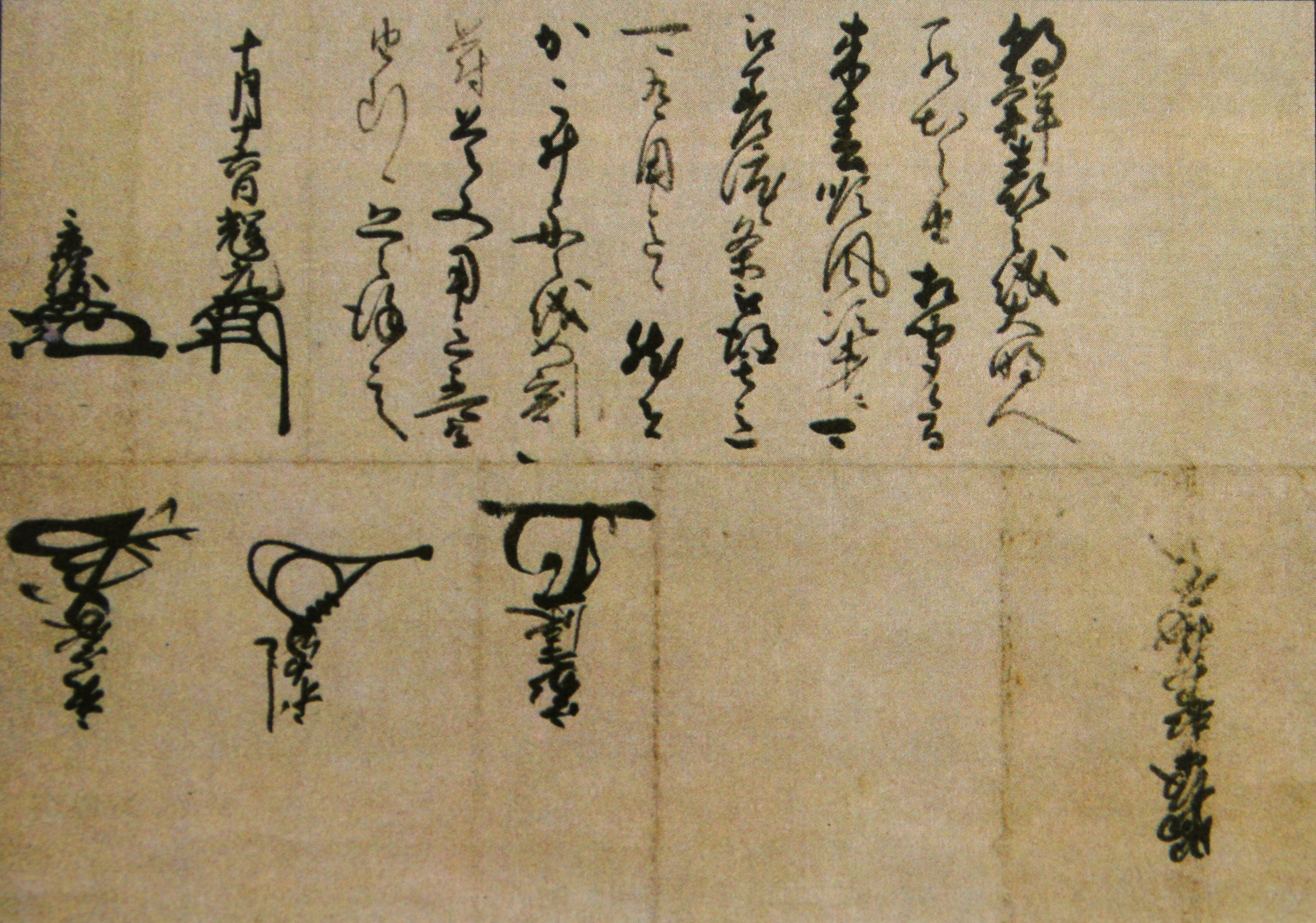
Marks of members of the Council of Five Elders

=== Vietnam ===
Huaya spread to Vietnam after Vietnamese independence from China. It was referred to as hoa áp. It was widely used during the Lê dynasty with both the Nguyễn and Trịnh lords using their own hoa áp. These hoa áp are seen in letters to Japan and other nations.

The hoa áp on a 1635 letter to Japan.

The hoa áp on a 1684 letter to Japan.

This hoa áp "曉示 hiểu thị" is from a 1606 letter by Nguyễn Hoàng 阮潢 to Tokugawa Ieyasu 徳川家康.

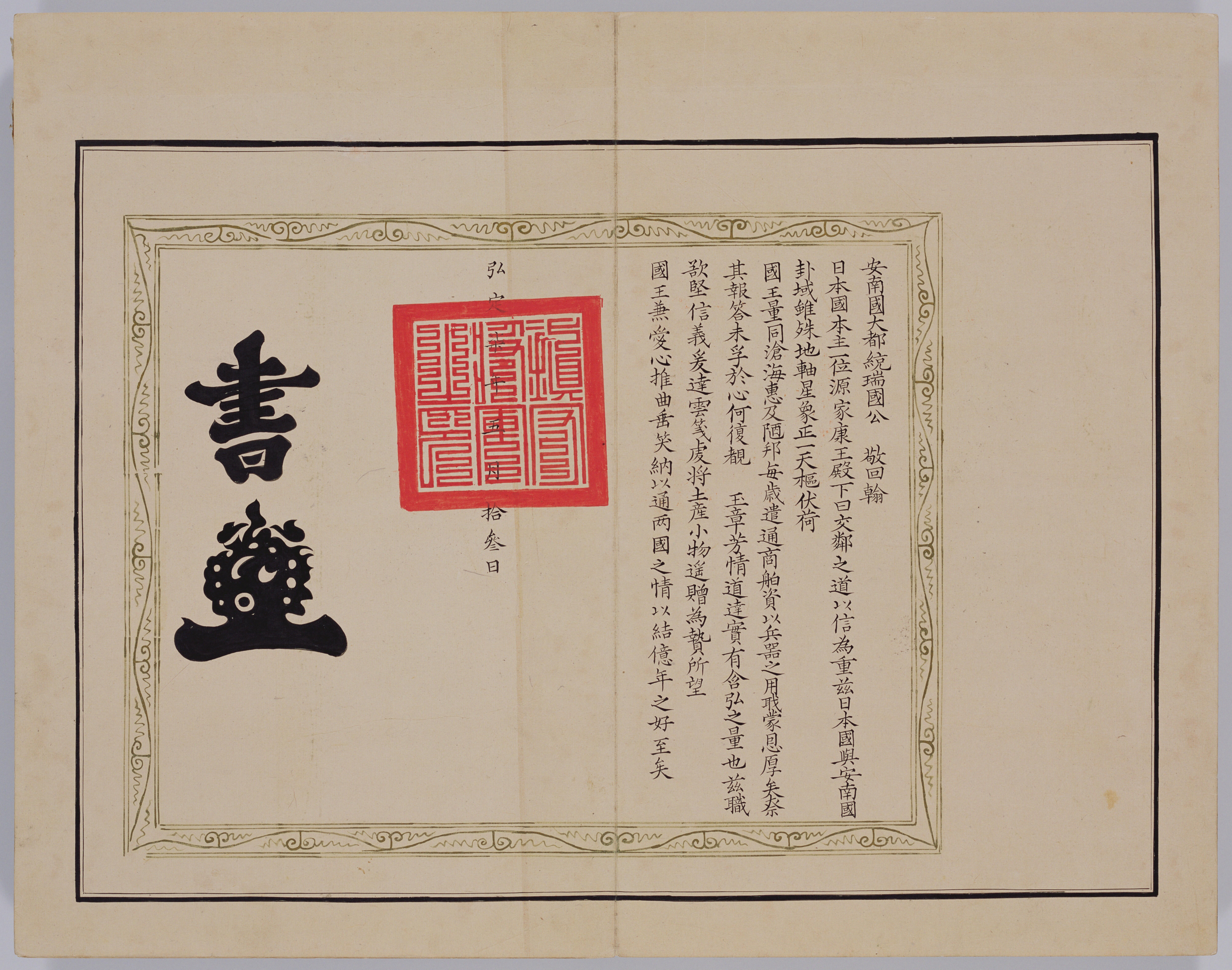
Mark of Nguyễn Hoàng (阮潢; 1525-1613) seen on a copy of a letter from Japan.

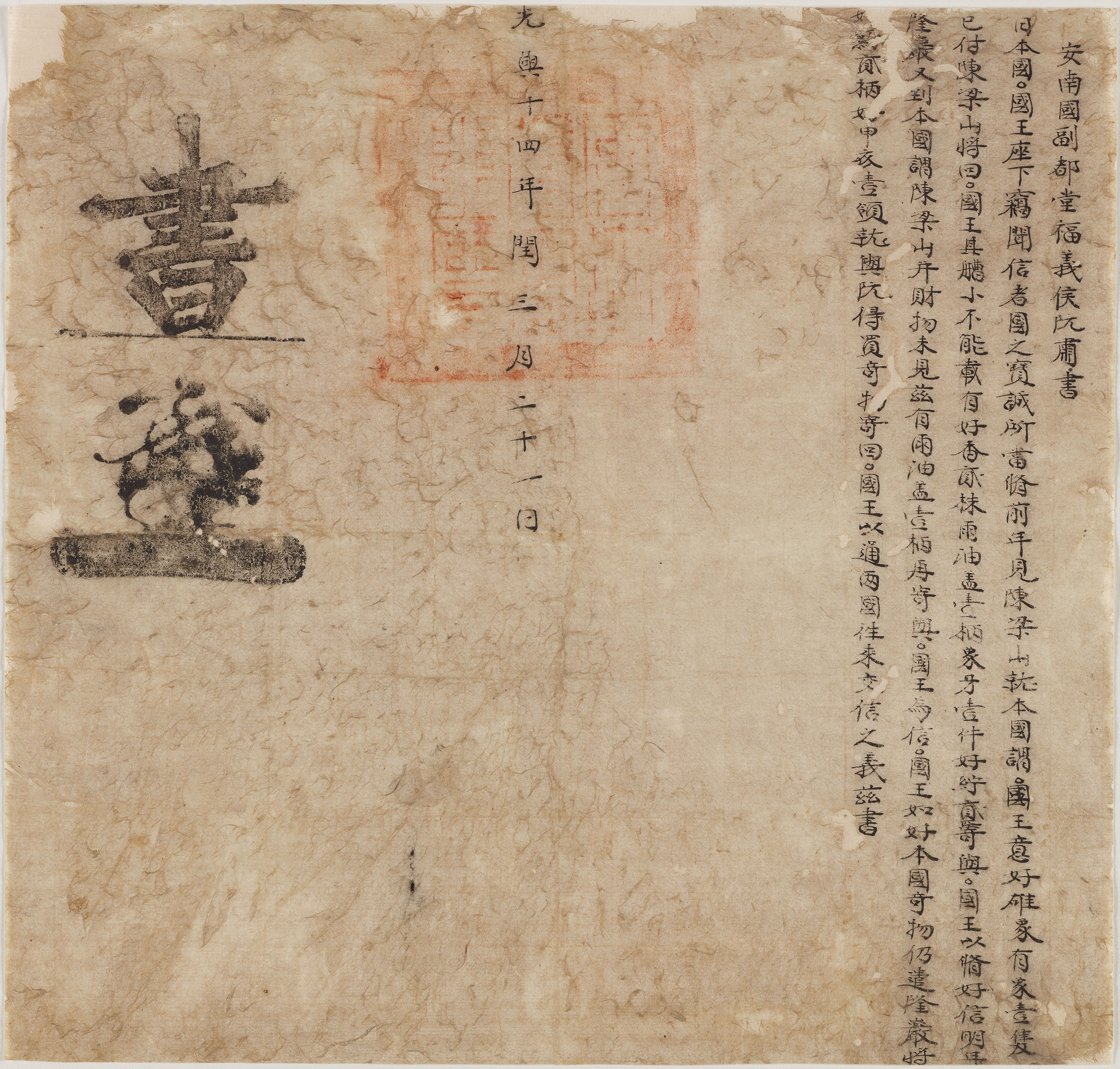
A hoa áp seen on a letter from Phúc Nghĩa Hầu (福義侯) to the “King of Japan”.

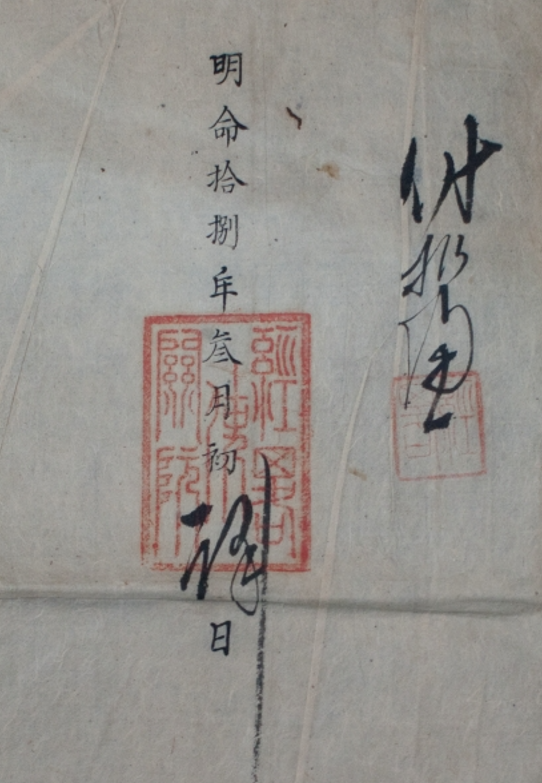
The hoa áp of Trương Đăng Quế (1793–1865) who had the position of Kinh lược sứ (經畧使).

== See also ==
- Tughra, stylised Arabic signatures used by Ottoman sultans
- Khelrtva, stylised Georgian calligraphic signatures
- Monogram
- Seals in the Sinosphere
- Signature
