= Uwajima Domain =

Administrative division in Japan during the Edo period

Uwajima Domain 宇和島藩
- Domain of Japan
- 1608–1871
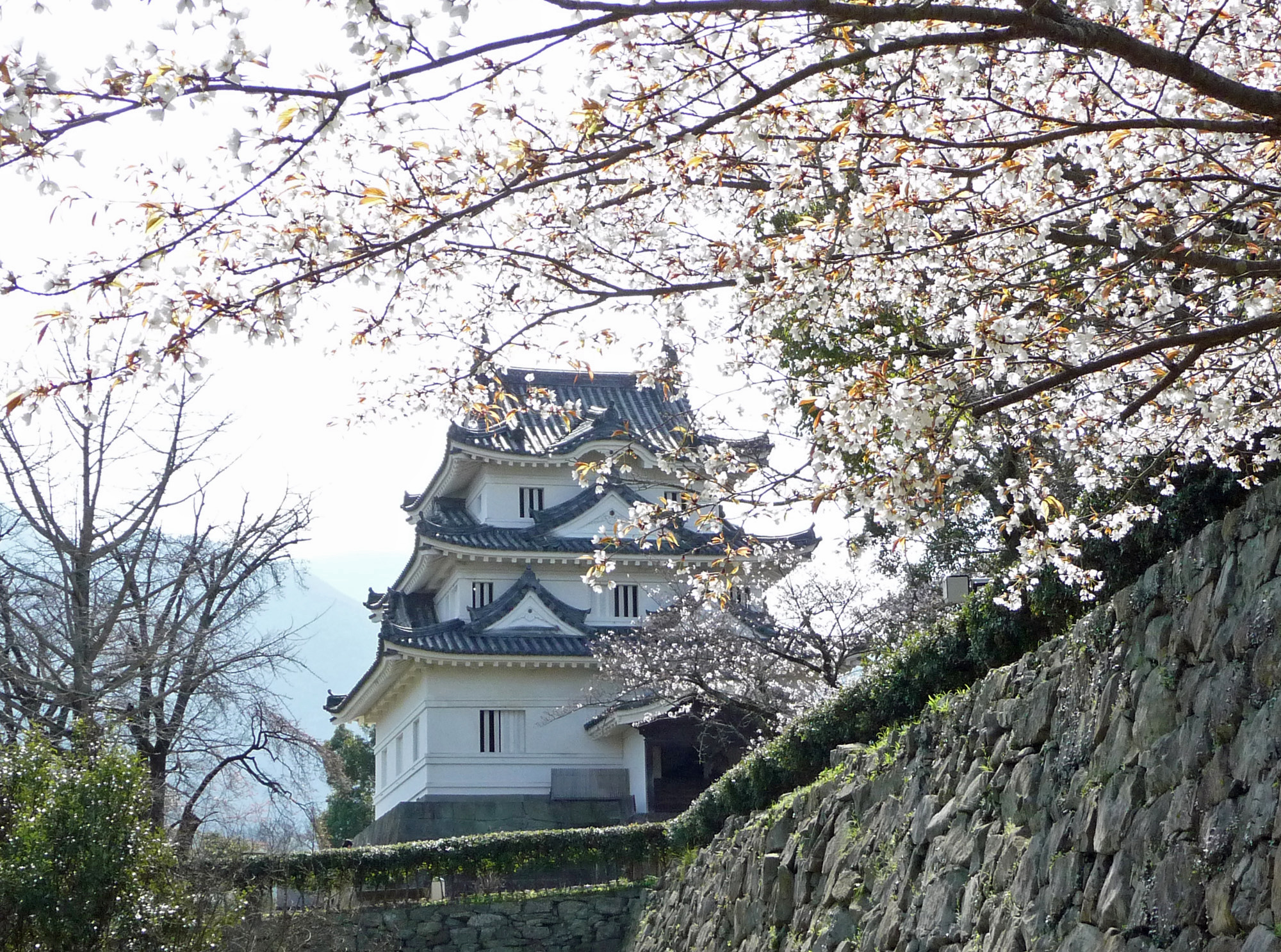
- Uwajima Castle in Uwajima, Ehime

- Mon of the Date clan
- Capital: Uwajima Castle
- Area
  - Coordinates: 33°13′10.12″N 132°33′54.85″E
- Historical era: Edo period
  - Established: 1608
  - Abolition of the han system: 1871
- Contained within
  - Province: Iyo
- Today part of: Ehime Prefecture

Location of Uwajima Castle
Uwajima Domain (Japan)

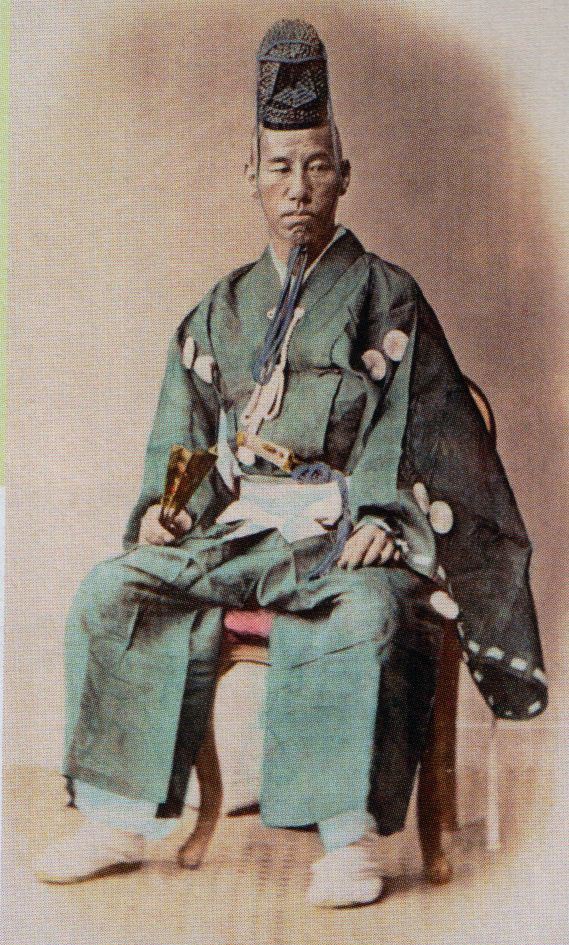
Date Munenari

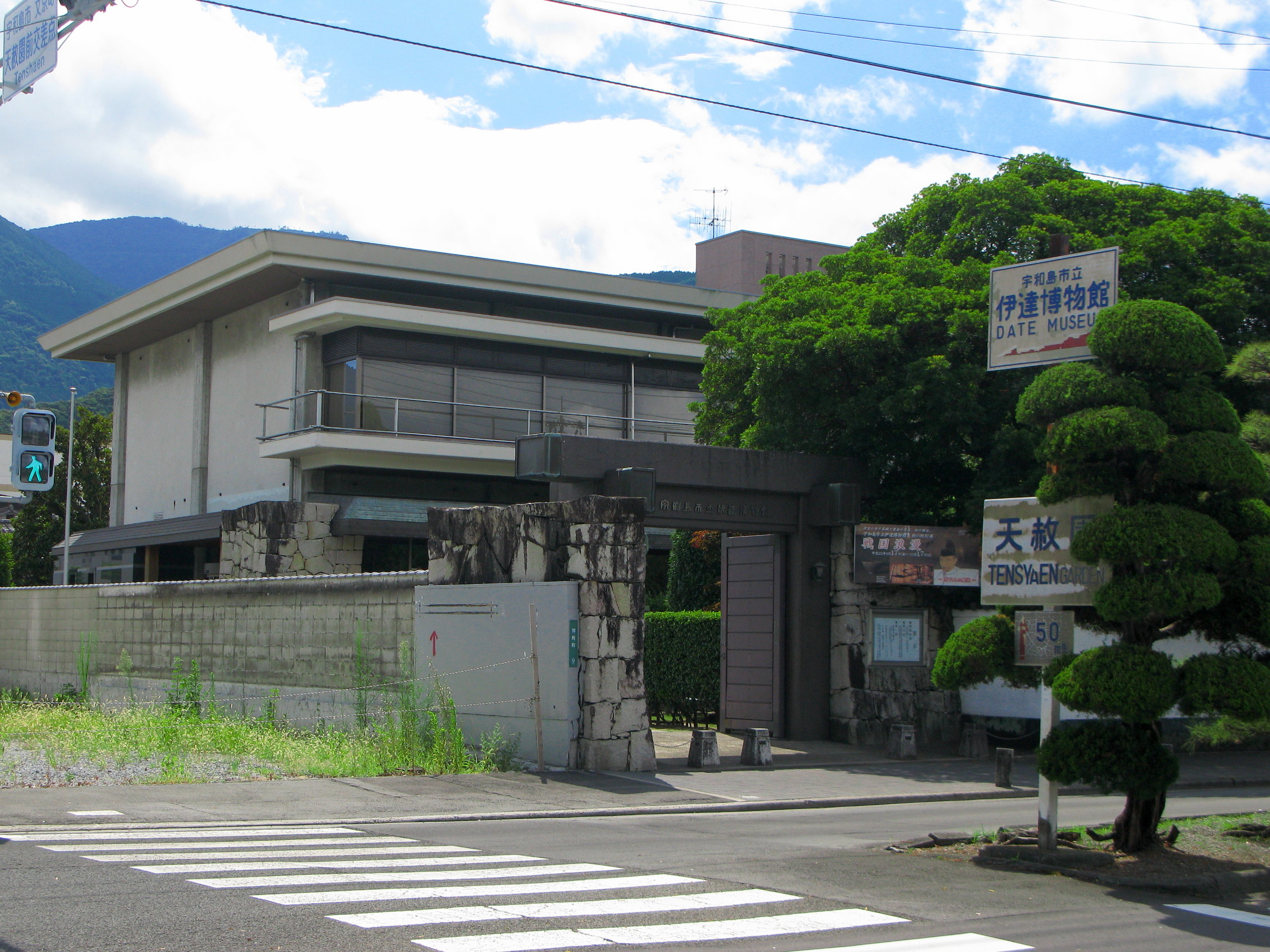
Uwajima Date Museum

Uwajima Domain (宇和島藩, Uwajima-han) was a feudal domain under the Tokugawa shogunate of Edo period Japan, in what is now western Ehime Prefecture on the island of Shikoku. It was centered around Uwajima Castle, and was ruled throughout its history by the tozama daimyō Date clan. Uwajima Domain was dissolved in the abolition of the han system in 1871 and is now part of Ehime Prefecture.

== History ==
=== Pre-Edo period Uwajima ===
During the Heian period, Uwajima (notably the island of Hiburijima in Uwajima Bay) was a center of piracy in the Seto Inland Sea and became the stronghold of Fujiwara no Sumitomo in his rebellion. During the Muromachi period, a branch of the Saionji family was appointed as governor of the area by the Ashikaga shogunate, but was constantly being invaded his more powerful and aggressive neighbors, including Ouchi Yoshitaka, Mōri Motonari, Ōtomo Sōrin, the Tosa-Ichijo clan and the Chōsokabe clan. The Saionji survived by the fluid loyalties and fierce resistance, but were eventually overcome by Chōsokabe Motochika, who was in turn overthrown by the forces of Toyotomi Hideyoshi. Iyo Province was given to Kobayakawa Takakage, who assigned the area around Uwajima to his adopted son and half-brother, Hidekane. Takakage was later transferred to Kyushu and was replaced by Hideyoshi's general Toda Katsutaka. In contrast to the Kobayakawa, the Toda ruled with extreme harshness, murdering the descendants of the Saionji family and thinking nothing of robbery, rape and murder of the local inhabitants. When ordered to send troops to the invasion of Korea in 1592, he cut down large trees in shrines and temples throughout his domain to construct ships. He went insane during the campaign, and died in Korea without heir. Hideyoshi then assigned Tōdō Takatora to the domain. A noted castle designer, Takatora spent six years building Itajima Castle, which would later be called Uwajima Castle. Following the Battle of Sekigahara and other campaigns, he was promoted to the 220,000 koku Tsu Domain in Ise Province.

=== Under the Tokugawa shogunate ===
In 1608, Tomita Nobutaka, daimyō of Tsu Domain with 50,000 koku, was ordered to trade places with Tōdō Takatora, and his kokudaka was increased to 101,900 koku. Tomita's wife was the daughter of Ukita Tadaie, and was a famous as a female warrior who had fought against the Mōri army in the Battle of Sekigahara. Her brother Sakazaki Naomori had a conflict with his nephew Ukita Samon. One of his pages had an affair with Ukita Samon, and the outraged Sakazaki Naomori ordered one of his vassals to kill the page. Instead, the vassal was killed, and Ukita Samon fled to Tomita Nobutaka for sanctuary. Nobutaka refused to turn Samon over to Sakazaki Naomori, which led to armed conflict and Naomori filed an appeal to the Shogun Tokugawa Hidetada and retired shogun Tokugawa Ieyasu for redress. Ukita Samon meanwhile fled to Kato Kiyomasa in Kumamoto, and then to Takahashi Mototane in Nobeoka. In 1613, the issue was brought to trial before the shogunate court, which ruled in favor of Sakazaki Naomori. Nobutaka and Mototane were deprived of their domains, and Nobutaka was sent to exile in Iwakidaira Domain, where his descendants were reduced to hatamoto status and Uwajima came under direct control of the shogunate.

In 1614, Date Hidemune was awarded the 100,000 koku Uwajima Domain by Shogun Tokugawa Hidetada, and moved into Uwajima Castle the following year. Hidemune was the illegitimate eldest son of Date Masamune who had been raised by Toyotomi Hideyoshi, but who sided loyally with the Tokugawa clan at the Siege of Osaka. Strictly speaking, this establishment was not a branch domain of Sendai Domain, but was regarded as a completely independent domain, although this status was frequently disputed by Sendai. In 1657, Hidemune retired, making his son Munetoshi is successor, but splitting the domain. Munetoshi had only 70,000 koku, and his younger brother Date Munezumi was given 30,000 koku and allowed to establish a cadet branch of the clan and subsidiary domain called Iyo-Yoshida Domain.

Munetoshi's tenure lasted for 36 years, and became a model for later generations; however, he had to contend with droughts, tight finances, floods, large fires, and boundary disputes with the Tosa and Iyo-Yoshida domains. In 1688, a five-year plan was drawn up, and in November 1693, Munetoshi handed over the domain to his son-in-law, Date Muneyoshi and retired. In 1696, the domain was officially able to restore its official kokudaka to 100,000 koku through development of new rice lands; however, the shogunate forced the domain to reconstruct the Yushima Seido in Edo, adding to its expenses. In 1711, Munetoki died and his third son, Muratoshi, became the fourth daimyō. During this period, droughts, famines, and floods continued, leading to a variety of reforms, including the issuance of paper currency, relief for victims, tree planting, civil engineering projects as emergency employment measures for refugees, and frugality ordinances, but he died suddenly at the age of 31 in May 1735.

The 5th daimyō Munetoki was a son of Muratoshi, and undertook a long-term revival during his 60-year tenure. In 1743, he issued a thrift ordinance and embarked on a reform of domain administration. He encouraged learning and martial arts, and in 1748, he opened the Naitokukan (later Meirinkan), han school open to both samurai and commoners. He also made wax an important product of the domain and established a monopoly on wax and on paper. In addition, he carried out large-scale agricultural policy reforms, prohibited gambling, conducted a review of duties of offices, and tax reform. These reforms were successful, but the Great Tenmei famine affected the domain seriously, leading to a succession of uprisings and peasant riots. In the midst of this, Munetoki died and was succeeded by Date Munenaga who continued his father's reforms centering on the appointment of capable samurai, frugality and expenditure restraint, expansion of revenue through the cultivation of commercial crops and sericulture, and relief for disaster victims. However, during this period, there were eight storms and floods, and one drought. In 1812, a revolt called the "Hagimori Incident" occurred due to a conflict of opinions among senior vassals over financial reconstruction.

In 1817, due to illness, Munenaga retired and his heir, Munetada, took over the administration of the domain, officially becoming seventh daimyō in 1824. He retired in 1844, and Date Munenari became eighth daimyō. Munenari promoted westernization, especially for the domain's the military, and employed Ōmura Masujirō among others, as advisors. He was also involved in the administration of the shogunate, and was later called one of the four wise leaders of the Bakumatsu period, along with Matsudaira Shungaku of Fukui Domain, Yamauchi Yōdō of Tosa Domain, and Shimazu Nariakira of Satsuma Domain. He was forced to retire during the Ansei Purge by Ii Naosuke, and his son Mune'e was appointed daimyō. However, Munenari continued to rule from behind-the-scenes and Mune'e was little more than a figurehead. Munenari returned to the forefront after the assassination of Ii Naosuke in 1860, had an audience with Emperor Kōmei and played an important role as a "go between" between the shogunate and the imperial court. During the Boshin War, he attempted to keep the domain as neutral and as far away from the fighting as possible, and devoted considerable energy to preventing pro-Tokugawa Iyo-Yoshida Domain from taking any action, and towards persuading Date Yoshikuni, the head of the pro-Tokugawa Ōuetsu Reppan Dōmei to surrender.

Under the Meiji government, Munenari served as Foreign Secretary, and in April 1871 was appointed ambassador plenipotentiary to conclude the Sino-Japanese Friendship and Trade Treaty. Later that year, with the abolition of the han system, Uwajima Domain became Uwajima Prefecture, which later became part of Ehime Prefecture. in 1884, Date Munenari became a marquess in the kazoku peerage. This was a higher title than the Sendai branch of the clan, but Uwajima played only a minor role in the Meiji government as it had not participated in Boshin War and few of its retainers left the domain for Tokyo.

== Holdings at the end of the Edo period ==
Unlike most domains in the han system, which consisted of several discontinuous territories calculated to provide the assigned kokudaka, based on periodic cadastral surveys and projected agricultural yields, Uwajima Domain was a single unified holding.

- Iyo Province
  - 163 villages in Uwa District

== List of daimyō ==
#	Name	Tenure	Courtesy title	Court Rank	kokudaka
Tomita clan, 1608–1613 (Tozama)
1	Tomita Nobutaka (富田信高)	1608–1613	Shinano-no-kami (信濃守)	Junior 4th Rank, Lower Grade (従四位下)	120,000 koku
tenryō 1613–1614
Date clan, 1614–1871 (Tozama)
1	Date Hidemune (伊達秀宗)	1614–1657	Totomi-no-kami (遠江守); Jijū (侍従)	Junior 4th Rank, Lower Grade (従四位下)	100,000 koku
2	Date Munetoshi (伊達宗利)	1657–1693	Totomi-no-kami (遠江守); Jijū (侍従)	Junior 4th Rank, Lower Grade (従四位下)	70,000 koku
3	Date Muneyoshi (伊達宗贇)	1693–1711	Kii-no-kami (紀伊守); Jijū (侍従)	Junior 4th Rank, Lower Grade (従四位下)	70,000 ->100,000 koku
4	Date Muratoshi (伊達村年)	1711–1735	Totomi-no-kami (遠江守)	Junior 4th Rank, Lower Grade (従四位下)	100,000 koku
5	Date Muratoki (伊達村候)	1735–1794	Sakone-no-chūjo (左近衛権少将)	Junior 4th Rank, Lower Grade (従四位下)	100,000 koku
6	Date Muranaga (伊達村寿)	1794–1824	Ukone-no-chūjo (右近衛権少将)	Junior 4th Rank, Lower Grade (従四位下)	100,000 koku
7	Date Munetada (伊達宗紀)	1824–1844	Sakone-no-chūjo (左近衛権少将)	Junior 4th Rank, Lower Grade (従四位下)	100,000 koku
8	Date Munenari (伊達宗城)	1844–1858	Sakone-no-chūjo (左近衛権少将); Jijū (侍従)	Junior 4th Rank, Upper Grade (従四位上)	100,000 koku
9	Date Mune'e (伊達宗徳)	1858–1871	Totomi-no-kami (遠江守)	Junior 4th Rank, Lower Grade (従四位下)	100,000 koku

== See also ==
- List of Han
- Abolition of the han system
