= Nishihara Loans =

Interwar Chinese loans from Japan

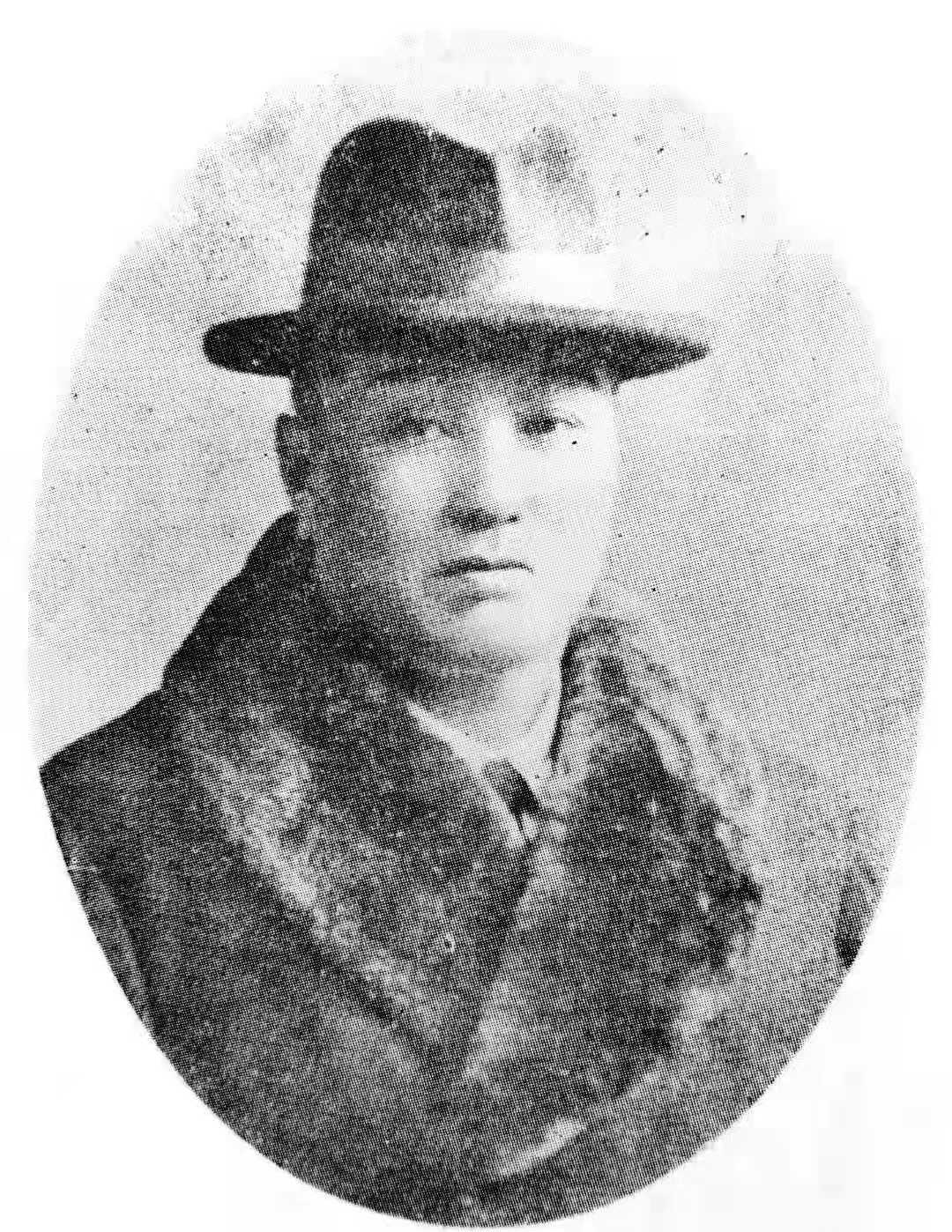
Kamezo Nishihara c. 1890-1920

The Nishihara Loans (西原借款, Nishihara Shakkan) were a series of loans made by the Japanese government under the administration of Prime Minister Terauchi Masatake to the Anhui clique warlord Duan Qirui from January 1917 to September 1918 to persuade him to favor Japanese interests in China. They were named after Nishihara Kamezō, Masatake's secretary.

In January 1917, Prime Minister Terauchi sent a personal envoy, a private businessman named Nishihara Kamezo (1873–1954) to negotiate a series of eight loans totaling 145 million yen to the leader of one of the splinter groups of the former Beiyang Army, Duan Qirui. Nishihara was backed by Finance Minister Shoda Kazue, formerly the president of the Bank of Chōsen in Korea. The loans were ostensibly private loans made by private banks as investments in the development of China; however, in reality the loans were underwritten by the Japanese government in assisting Duan Qirui in his civil war to overcome his rivals for control of northern China.

In return for this financial support, Japan received confirmation of its claims to the former German Kiautschou Bay concession in Shandong Province, control of the railways in Shandong Province, and additional rights in Manchuria.

When the loans and details of the Sino-Japanese Joint Defence Agreement were leaked to the public, Duan Qirui was virulently attacked for having made traitorous deals with the Japanese. Some of the rights granted to Japan were very similar to the 5th clause of the recently rejected Twenty-One Demands. This popular discontent grew into the May Fourth Movement.
