= Sino-Japanese Joint Defence Agreement =

1918 military agreement between the Republic of China and the Empire of Japan

- Signed: 16 May 1918 (Army agreement); 19 May 1918 (Naval agreement)
- Location: Beijing
- Expiration: 28 January 1921
- Parties: China; Japan
- Languages: Chinese; Japanese

The Sino-Japanese Joint Defence Agreement was a series of secret military pacts between the Republic of China and the Empire of Japan, signed in May 1918. Drawn up following China's entry into the First World War on the part of the Allied Powers, the agreements, which were concluded in secrecy, granted Japan numerous military privileges within Chinese territory along the Sino-Russian border. The content of agreements were leaked to the press at an early stage, sparking a widespread protest movement by Chinese students in Japan and across China. The agreements were officially terminated in January 1921, their continuance made untenable by Chinese public opinion.

== Background ==
Sino-Japanese Joint Defence Agreement

Chinese name
- Traditional Chinese: 中日共同防敵軍事協定
Transcriptions
Standard Mandarin
- Hanyu Pinyin: Zhōng rì gòngtóng fáng dí jūnshì xiédìng

Japanese name
- Kanji: 日支共同防敵軍事協定
Transcriptions
- Romanization: Nisshi kyōdō bōteki gunji kyōtei

The government of the Republic of China, led by Premier Duan Qirui, declared war on the German Empire and Austria-Hungary on 14 August 1917, marking China's entry into the First World War on the side of the Allied Powers, which included the Empire of Japan. As a result, Germany and Austria-Hungary became China and Japan's common enemy. Furthermore, following the outbreak of the 1917 October Revolution in Russia, the Allies declared the new communist government of Vladimir Lenin a threat.

From this time, Tanaka Giichi, then Vice Chief of the Imperial Japanese Army General Staff Office, began planning to conclude a military pact with China, including a potential military alliance. In late January, Tanaka wired instructions to the Japanese military attaché in Beijing, ordering him to swiftly move to form a Sino-Japanese agreement, and furthermore, to try and get the Chinese side to suggest the idea first.

Within the Chinese government, there were doubts about the Japanese side's intentions with regard to any agreement, and specifically, they were concerned that such an agreement might lead to the Japanese effecting control over Manchuria. However, Japanese foreign minister Motono Ichirō offered the example of Allied military co-operation in France, and said that, if the Allies could jointly operate their military forces there, it would be illogical to not do the same in Manchuria. The Japanese side also hinted at the possibility of unilateral deployment in the event China did not acquiesce. With the 3 March 1918 signing of the Treaty of Brest-Litovsk between the nascent Russian Soviet Republic and Germany, the Chinese side grew increasingly concerned about the presence of 100,000 German prisoners of war in neighbouring Siberia. Worried that these German forces would be released and threaten the security of the Far East, they came to feel the necessity of concluding a Sino-Japanese agreement.

== The agreement ==
The Terauchi Masatake government decided on 8 March to begin drawing up plans for the proposed Sino-Japanese agreement, and informed Chinese Minister in Tokyo Zhang Zongxiang as such. A team led by Major General Saitō Suejirō was despatched to China to negotiate the terms of the agreement. On 25 March, Zhang and foreign minister Motono exchanged correspondence wherein they agreed that enemy forces were spreading rampantly along the Russian border, threatening the Far East's security, and agreed to consider the conclusion of a joint defence agreement.

While these negotiations were conducted in secret, newspapers quickly caught wind of them, and reported on them from early April. Opposition to the agreement spread quickly throughout China. The Japanese side's intent is made clear by a Foreign Ministry record written around this time, which states that the establishment of a Sino-Japanese alliance would allow for the free movement of Japanese troops within Chinese territory, the commandeering of any resources that were militarily required, active interference in China's domestic politics, and the "planting" of pro-Japanese forces across China.

On 3 May, Tanaka Giichi visited Zhang at the Chinese Legation in Tokyo, and demanded an apology from the Chinese side for doubting Japan's intentions and failing to participate in further deliberations. He stated that, until an agreement was signed, Japan would have no choice but to suspend the financial and military aid it had been providing to China through the Nishihara Loans. Accordingly, negotiations were reopened the following day, and by 16 May, the army agreement was signed. A naval agreement, largely mirroring the army agreement, was signed on 19 May.

The army agreement consists of twelve articles. While the second article ostensibly establishes the parties of the agreement as equals, the third article specifies that the Chinese authorities must "try their best" to co-operate with the Japanese military in the relevant regions and prevent them from "experiencing any obstacles" in their operations. The fourth article specifies that Japanese troops will be "entirely withdrawn" from Chinese territory at the termination of the war. The seventh article specifies the placement of liaison officers in each party's military to facilitate communication between the two parties, and specifies that both parties must provide whatever resources are required to for facilitate their joint defence. The full contents of the pact were not officially disclosed until 14 March 1919.

Because of the start of the Paris Peace Conference on 18 January 1919, it was necessary to clarify the end date of the agreements, which was done on 5 February for the army agreement and 1 March for the naval agreement. The pact was thus specified to terminate when both the Chinese and Japanese governments approved the peace treaties with Germany and Austria negotiated by the European powers, and when all Chinese and Japanese troops stationed outside of Chinese territory had been withdrawn.

== Effect ==
While the agreement's ostensible goal was to counter German–Austrian forces, the emergent communist threat in Siberia and Manchuria was of a more immediate concern. The agreement allowed Japan to lay the groundwork for its intervention in Siberia, and effectively placed the Chinese military in northern Manchuria under Japanese command.

Though the Japanese government had issued orders prohibiting any discussion of the negotiations in the domestic media, Chinese students in Japan were made aware of the impending signing of the agreement through reporting in foreign newspapers, and swiftly moved to organise a protest movement against the agreement from the end of April 1918. Called the "Returning Home Movement", it resulted in one-third of the three thousand students in Japan returning to China. The students returned to Japan in the autumn of 1918, however. Future Chinese premier Zhou Enlai, then studying in Japan, observed the movement with interest, but did not return to China. Protests also occurred in China, specifically by students in Beijing and by chambers of commerce across the country. The agreement, which was essentially an alliance, was viewed by the Chinese public as an attempt by Japan to use Duan Qirui to control China, and the anti-agreement movement that it spurred laid the groundwork for the May Fourth movement.

While Duan desired to retain the agreement in some form after the end of the First World War, public opinion driven by the protest movement made this impossible. Duan was forced to resign in August 1920 following his loss in the Zhili–Anhui War, and as a result, the basis for the agreement completely collapsed. It was officially terminated on 28 January 1921.
