= Zhou's Four Principles =

Four Principles of Zhou Enlai or simply Zhou's Four Principles (Chinese: 周四原則; pinyin: zhōusì yuánzé) were presented by China's Premier Zhou Enlai as conditions for continuing trade between China (PRC) and Japan when Kenzō Matsumura visited China on April 19, 1970. It is said that the China side's intention behind these conditions was to counter the hostile policy toward China adopted by the Satō Cabinet in Japan at the time.

At the time, China (PRC) said it would refuse to do business with any of the following:

1. Companies conducting trade with South Korea and Taiwan.
2. Companies making investments in South Korea and Taiwan.
3. Companies providing weapons to the United States for use in the Vietnam War.
4. U.S. subsidiaries in Japan or U.S. joint ventures with Japanese companies.

Zhou's Four Principles prompted a move by Japanese companies seeking to do business in China to temporarily suspend economic exchanges with or investments in South Korea and Taiwan (ROC), but Zhou's Four Principles was abolished on March 7, 1973, following the 1972 normalization of diplomatic relations between China and Japan.
