= Date Hidemune =

Japanese daimyō

- 伊達 秀宗
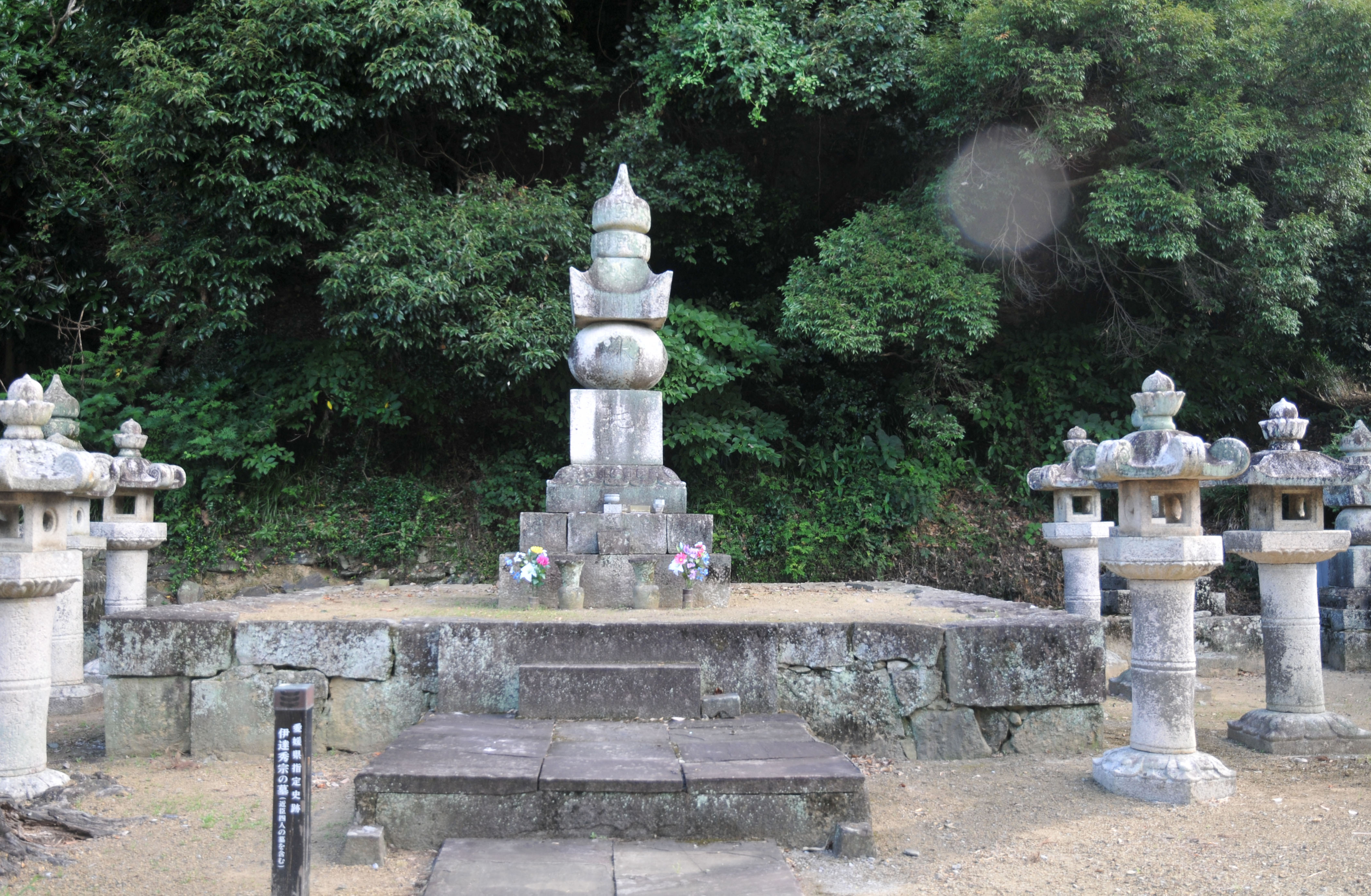
- Date Hidemune's grave at Tōgaku-ji in Uwajima

Daimyō of Uwajima
- In office 1614–1657
- Preceded by: Tomita Nobutaka
- Succeeded by: Date Munetoshi

Personal details
- Born: November 11, 1591 Mutsu Province, Japan
- Died: July 8, 1658 (aged 66) Uwajima Domain, Japan
- Spouse: a daughter of Ii Naomasa
- Parent: Date Masamune (father)

Military service
- Allegiance: Date clan Tokugawa Shogunate
- Unit: Date clan
- Commands: Uwajima Domain
- Battles/wars: Osaka Campaign

Date Hidemune (伊達 秀宗; DAH-tay; November 11, 1591 – July 8, 1658) was a Japanese daimyō of the early Edo period. He was the eldest son of Date Masamune, born in 1591 by Shinzo no Kata (a concubine). Coming of age while living with Toyotomi Hideyoshi, he received a character from Hideyoshi's name and took the adult name of Hidemune. Hideyoshi also granted him the court rank of junior 5th, lower grade (従五位下, ju go-i no ge) and the title of ji-jū, appointing the young Hidemune as a page to his own son Toyotomi Hideyori. After Hideyoshi's death in 1598, he was made a hostage at the residence of Ukita Hideie.

Though he was Masamune's eldest son, Hidemune was born by a concubine, and therefore could not be the successor to the Sendai Domain, which his father ruled. Masamune therefore considered the possibility of having Hidemune start a branch family. This was made possible in 1614, when father and son took part in the Osaka Campaign: Hidemune received the 100,000 koku Uwajima Domain which Tokugawa Ieyasu granted to Masamune. Hidemune immediately entered his new fief as daimyō, and ruled until his retirement in Meireki 3 (1657).

Preceded by Tomita Nobutaka	Daimyō of Uwajima; 1614–1657	Succeeded by Date Munetoshi
