= Sino-Japanese Friendship and Trade Treaty =

1871 treaty between Japan and China

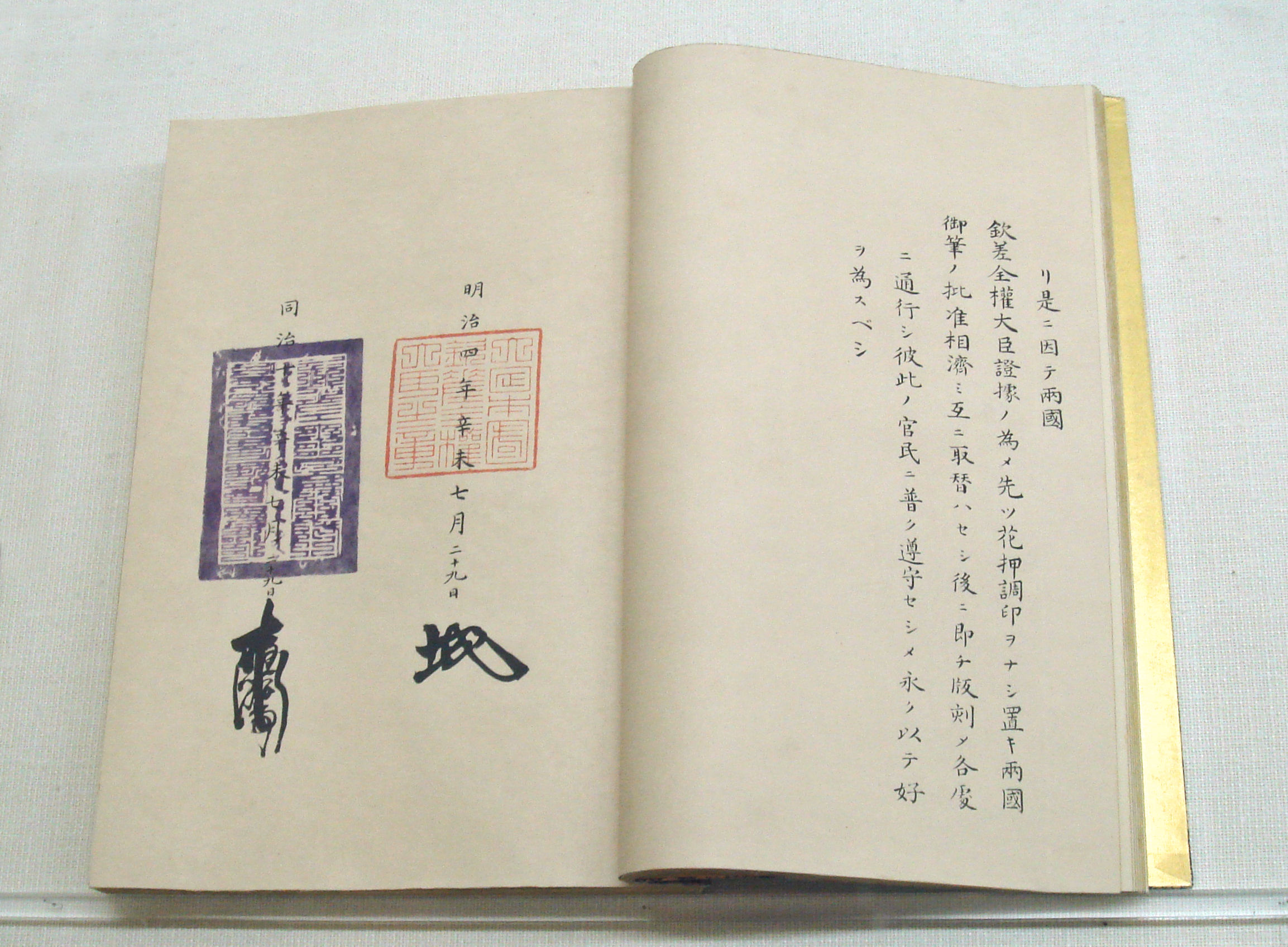
Sino-Japanese Friendship and Trade Treaty, 13 September 1871. The treaty was signed in Tientsin, by Date Munenari and Li Hongzhang.

The Sino-Japanese Friendship and Trade Treaty (Note: (Nisshin shūkō jōki (日清修好条規); simplified Chinese: 中日修好条规; traditional Chinese: 中日修好條規; pinyin: Zhōngrì Xiūhǎo Tiáoguī)) was the first treaty between the Empire of Japan and Qing China. It was signed on 13 September 1871 in Tientsin by Date Munenari and Plenipotentiary Li Hongzhang.

The treaty guaranteed the judiciary rights of Consuls, and fixed trade tariffs between the two countries.

The treaty was ratified in the spring of 1873 and was applied until the First Sino-Japanese War, which led to a renegotiation with the Treaty of Shimonoseki.

== See also ==
- People's Republic of China–Japan relations
