= Date Munenari =

Japanese lord and politician (1818–1892)

Junior First Rank Date Munenari
- 伊達 宗城
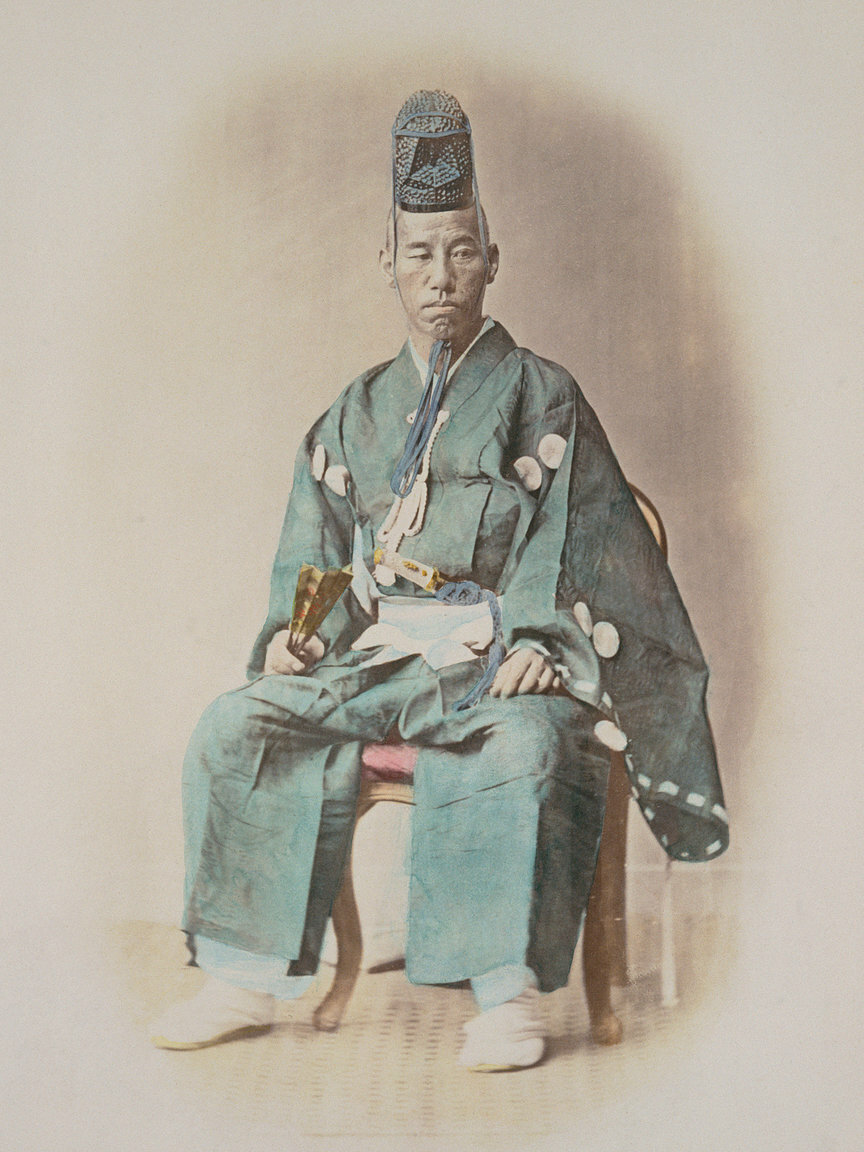
- Daimyo Date Munenari

Lord of Uwajima
- In office 1844–1858
- Preceded by: Date Munetada
- Succeeded by: Date Mune'e

Personal details
- Born: September 1, 1818 Edo, Japan
- Died: December 20, 1892 (aged 74)

Date Munenari (伊達 宗城; DAH-tay; September 1, 1818 – December 20, 1892) was the eighth head of the Uwajima Domain during the Late Tokugawa shogunate and a politician of the early Meiji era.

== Early life ==
Munenari was born in Edo, the 4th son of the hatamoto Yamaguchi Naokatsu. Munenari, then known as Kamesaburō 亀三郎, was a candidate for adoption by the heirless 7th generation Uwajima lord Date Munetada because Naokatsu's father was the 5th Uwajima lord, Date Muratoki.

== Clan leader ==
Munenari succeeded to headship in 1844. The tairō Ii Naosuke ordered Munenari's retirement in 1858. He was placed under house arrest.

He returned to prominence in the subsequent years of political maneuvering in Kyoto, as a member of the conciliatory kōbu gattai (公武合体 union of court and bakufu) party. Late in Bunkyū 3 (1863), as a proponent of kōbu gattai, he was made a member of the imperial advisory council (sanyō-kaigi 参与会議), together with Matsudaira Katamori and other like-minded lords.

== National leader ==
After the fall of the shogunate in 1868, Munenari took an active role in the new imperial government; Uwajima as a domain was also deeply involved in the military campaign of the Boshin War (1868–1869).

Munenari was a crucial figure in Japan's international relations during the early Meiji period. In 1871, representing the Japanese government, he signed the Sino-Japanese Friendship and Trade Treaty (Nisshin shukō jōki (日清修好条規)) with Li Hongzhang, a viceroy of Qing Dynasty China.

Also in 1871, the han system was abolished in Japan, and he was able to fully cut his political ties to Uwajima. In 1881, Munenari entertained King Kalākaua, of the Kingdom of Hawaiʻi, on the first state visit to Japan of an actual head of state in its recorded history. His stepson Mune'e was first created a count in the new peerage system, but was later promoted to marquess.

Munenari died at Imado in Tokyo in 1892, at age 75.

== Gallery ==
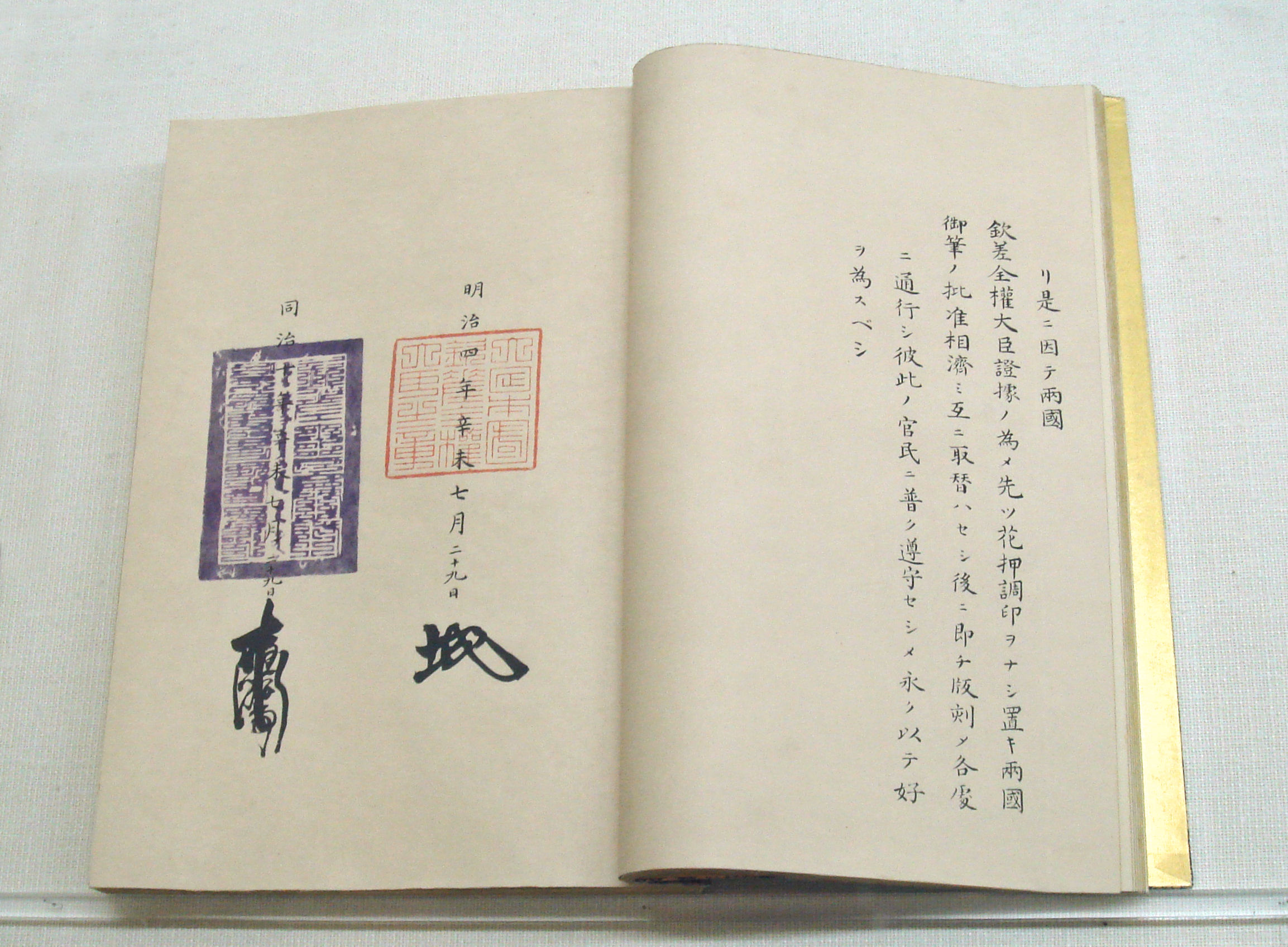
Sino-Japanese Friendship and Trade Treaty, 13 September 1871. The treaty was signed in Tientsin, by Date Munenari and Li Hongzhang

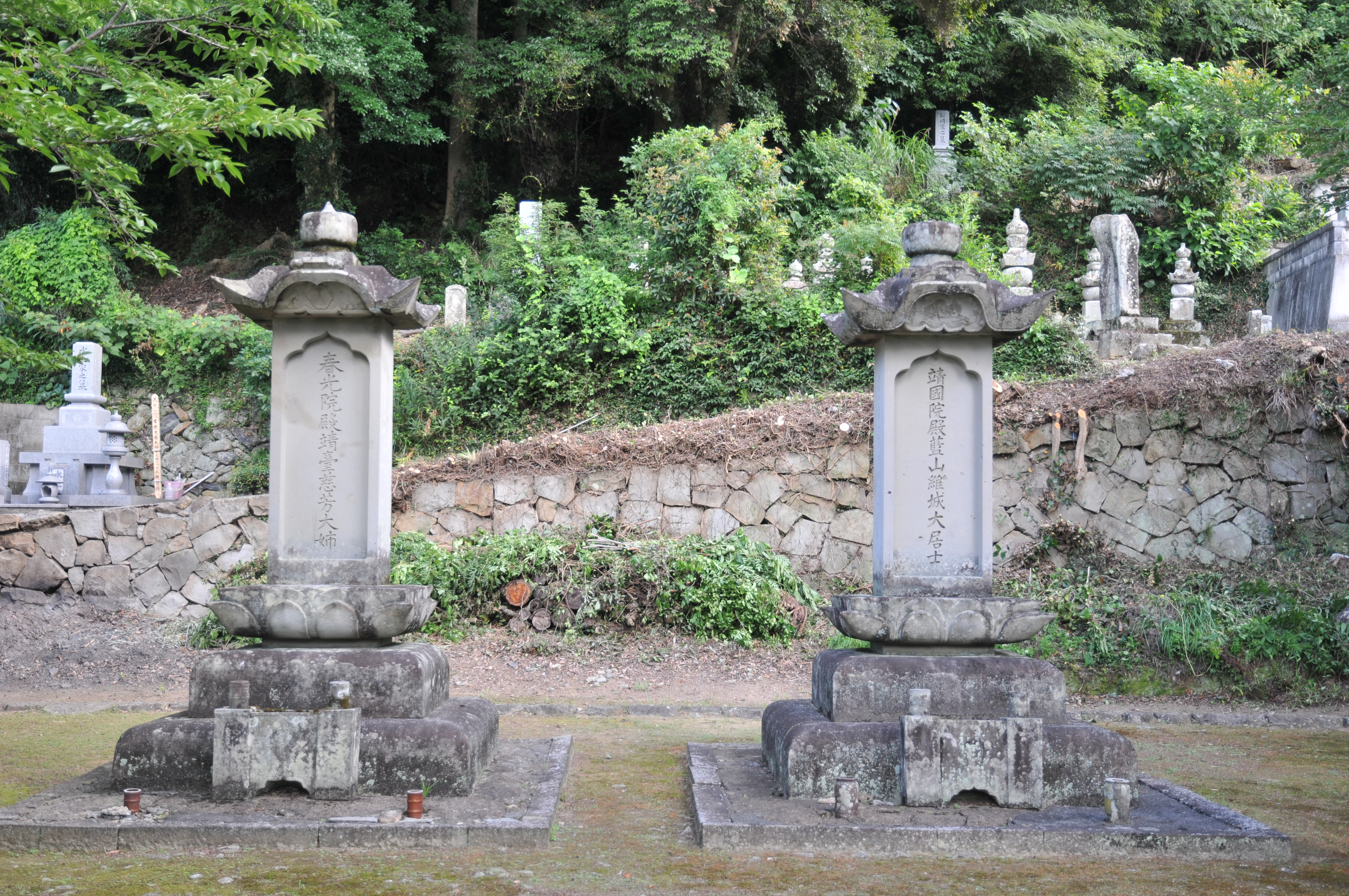
Tomb of Date Munenari (right) in Uwajima (宇和島 等覚寺)

The emblem (mon) of the Date clan

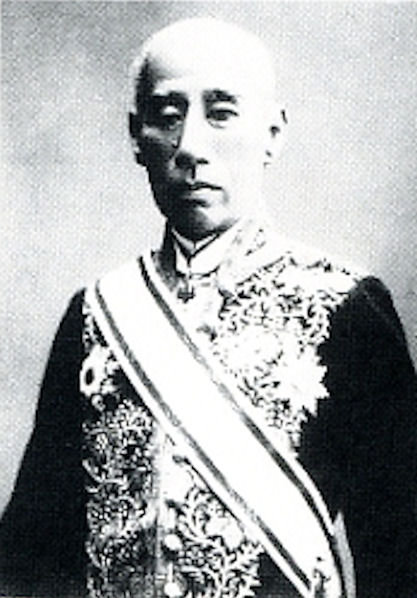
The Marquis Date Munenari

== See also ==
- Ansei purge
- Date clan

== Ancestry ==
Ancestors of Date Munenari

16. Date Muratoshi, 4th Lord of Uwajima (1705-1735)
8. Date Muratoki, 5th Lord of Uwajima (1725-1794)
17. Date Tomiko
4. Yamaguchi Naokiyo (1754-1793)
9. Tanaka
2. Yamaguchi Naokatsu (1777-1825)
5. Yamaguchi Yoshiko
1. Date Munenari
3. Sawagi

== Notes ==
Preceded by Date Munetada	Daimyō of Uwajima; 1844-1858	Succeeded by Date Mune'e
