= Dokuganryū Masamune =

- Cover of Disc 5 DVD Release
- Genre: Historical, Jidaigeki
- Written by: James Miki
- Directed by: Katsuji Nakamura
- Starring: Ken Watanabe; Tomokazu Miura; Teruhiko Saigō; Junko Sakurada; Yasuko Sawaguchi; Hiroyuki Sanada; Kanako Higuchi; Eiji Okuda; Hironobu Nomura; Chosuke Ikariya; Takanori Jinnai; Hiroshi Katsuno; Yoichi Hayashi; Shigeru Kōyama; Mikiko Otonashi; Renji Ishibashi; Minori Terada; Raita Ryū; Kei Tani; Ryūnosuke Kaneda; Ryō Ikebe; Isao Yamagata; Kumiko Akiyoshi; Hideji Ōtaki; Yoshio Harada; Kaoru Yachigusa; Masahiko Tsugawa; Shima Iwashita; Kin'ya Kitaōji; Shintaro Katsu
- Narrated by: Seiji Kasai
- Opening theme: NHK Symphony Orchestra
- Composer: Shin’ichirō Ikebe
- Country of origin: Japan
- Original language: Japanese
- No. of episodes: 50

Production
- Running time: 45 minutes

Original release
- Network: NHK
- Release: January 1987 – December 1987

Dokuganryū Masamune (独眼竜政宗) is a 1987 Japanese historical television series. It is the 25th NHK taiga drama. The broadcast received an average viewer rating of 39.7 percent in the Kanto area with the highest viewing rating of 47.8%. The drama was adapted from the novel of Sōhachi Yamaoka.

== Plot ==
The drama takes place during the late Sengoku and early Edo periods.

It chronicles the life of Date Masamune, from before his birth until his death.

Toyotomi Hideyoshi unified Japan in 1590, but Date Masamune did not abandon his ambition to rule the nation at every possible opportunity.

== Production ==
- Original – Sōhachi Yamaoka
- Music – Shin’ichirō Ikebe
- Historical research – Keizō Suzuki
- Sword fight arranger - Kunishirō Hayashi
- Supervisor - Yasumune Date

== Cast ==
=== Starring role ===
- Ken Watanabe as Date Masamune, the one-eyed dragon
  - Ryota Fujima (later Fujima Kanjuro VIII) as Bontenmaru (child Masamune)
  - Eiji Shima as Tojiro (pre-teen Masamune)

=== Date clan ===
- Kin'ya Kitaōji as Date Terumune, Masamune's father
- Shima Iwashita as Yoshihime, Masamune's mother
- Junko Sakurada as Megohime (adult), Masamune's wife
  - Kumiko Goto as Megohime (teenager)
- Tomokazu Miura as Date Shigezane, Masamune's cousin
- Raita Ryū as Date Sanemoto, Shigezane's father
- Teruhiko Saigō as Katakura Kojūrō, Masamune's most trusted vassal
- Keiko Takeshita as Katakura Kita, Kojūrō's half-sister
- Mikiko Otonashi as Tsuta, Kojūrō's wife
- Kenichi Okamoto as Date Kojirō, Masamune's younger brother
- Kumiko Akiyoshi as Iizaka no Tsubone, also known as Neko Gozen
- Yasuko Sawaguchi as Iroha, Masamune's first daughter
- Chosuke Ikariya as Oniniwa Sagetsu
- Takehiro Murata Oniniwa Tsunamoto
- Shigeru Kōyama as Endō Motonobu
- Kyōzō Nagatsuka as Rusu Masakage
- Mitsuru Hirata as Suzuki Motonobu
- Minori Terada as Ōuchi Sadatsuna
- Machiko Washio as Ochako
- Nobuo Yana as Munefuyu Murata
- Shirō Sano as Goto Nobuyasu
- Issey Ogata as Kokubu Morishige
- Hironobu Nomura as Date Tadamune, Masamune's second son
- Michiko Godai as Tose, Shigezane's wife
- Muneyuki Satō as Hasekura Tsunenaga
- Dai Nagasawa as Nakajima Munemoto

=== Mogami clan ===
- Yoshio Harada as Mogami Yoshiaki
- Imafuku Masao as Mogami Yoshimori
- Kaori Sakagami as Komahime, Yoshiaki's second daughter

=== Toyotomi clan ===
- Shintaro Katsu as Toyotomi Hideyoshi, the ruler of Japan
- Kaoru Yachigusa as Nene
- Kanako Higuchi as Yodo-dono, Hideyori's mother
- Eiji Okuda as Ishida Mitsunari
- Kisuke Yamashita as Toyotomi Hideyori, Hideyoshi's son
- Maiko Itō as Senhime
- Yoichi Hayashi as Asano Nagamasa
- Takanori Jinnai as Toyotomi Hidetsugu
- Yumiko Nogawa as Asahi no kata
- Takaaki Enoki as Ōno Harunaga
- Minoru Ōki as Maeda Toshiie
- Ken Teraizumi as Gamō Ujisato
- Gō Wakabayashi as Sanada Yukimura
- Tatsuo Matsumura as Katagiri Katsumoto
- Nobuyuki Katsube as Gotō Matabei
- Makoto Yuasa as Maeda Gen'i

=== Tokugawa clan ===
- Masahiko Tsugawa as Tokugawa Ieyasu, the founder and first shogun of the Tokugawa shogunate
- Hiroyuki Sanada as Matsudaira Tadateru, Iroha's husband
- Hiroshi Katsuno as Tokugawa Hidetada
- Shin Takuma as Tokugawa Iemitsu
- Junichi Nitta as Yūki Hideyasu
- Renji Ishibashi as Yagyū Munenori

=== Tamura clan ===
- Akira Kubo as Tamura Kiyoaki, Megohime's father
- Isao Yamagata as Mukaidate Takumi

=== Others ===
- Hideji Ōtaki as Kosai Sōitsu
- Ryūnosuke Kaneda as Ōkubo Nagayasu
- Ryō Ikebe as Sen no Rikyū
- Kei Tani as Imai Sōkun
- José Cardini as Luis Sotelo
- Joe Grace as Sebastián Vizcaíno
- Gentarō Ishida as Hatakeyama Yoshitsugu
- Hiroshi Arikawa as Shinjō Danjō
- Shinichi Tsutsumi as Ashina Yoshihiro
- Ryūzaburō Ōtomo as Kubota Jūrō
- Shin Aomori as Furukawa Danjō

== Television schedule ==
Episode	Original airdate	Title	Directed by	Rating
1	January 4, 1987	"Birth" (誕生, Tanjō)	Masahiro Higuchi	28.7%
2	January 11, 1987	"Fudō Myō'ō" (不動明王, Fudō Myō'ō)	Masahiro Higuchi	36.9%
3	January 18, 1987	"Parental Love" (親ごころ, Oya Gokoro)	Yoshiyuki Yoshimura	40.7%
4	January 25, 1987	"Coming-of-age Ceremony" (元服, Genpuku)	Yoshiyuki Yoshimura	37.9%
5	February 1, 1987	"Megohime" (愛姫, Megohime)	Masahiro Higuchi	42.0%
6	February 8, 1987	"Handmaidens Punishment" (侍女成敗, Jijo Seibai)	Masahiro Higuchi	45.8%
7	February 15, 1987	"First Battle" (初陣, Uijin)	Yoshiyuki Yoshimura	43.0%
8	February 22, 1987	"Young Warrior" (若武者, Wakamusha)	Yoshiyuki Yoshimura	45.2%
9	March 1, 1987	"Ambition" (野望, Yabō)	Masahiro Higuchi	43.4%
10	March 8, 1987	"A Man's Ability" (男の器量, Otoko no Kiryō)	Masahiro Higuchi	43.7%
11	March 15, 1987	"Slaughter of Eight Hundred" (八百人斬り, Happyakunin-giri)	Yoshiyuki Yoshimura	46.9%
12	March 22, 1987	"Terumune's Cold-blooded Tragedy" (輝宗無残, Terumune Muzan)	Yoshiyuki Yoshimura	43.1%
13	March 29, 1987	"Hitotoribashi" (人取橋, Hitotori-bashi)	Yoshiki Nishimura	41.2%
14	April 5, 1987	"Declared Victor" (勝ち名乗り, Kachinanori)	Masahiro Higuchi	36.5%
15	April 12, 1987	"Mego and Neko" (めごとねこ, Mego to Neko)	Yoshiyuki Yoshimura	35.9%
16	April 19, 1987	"Enemy of the North and South" (南北の敵, Nanboku no Teki)	Yoshiyuki Yoshimura	35.1%
17	April 26, 1987	"Court Service" (宮仕え, Miyazukae)	Yukinori Kida	40.3%
18	May 3, 1987	"Lady of the East's Stand" (お東、居座る, Ohigashi, Isuwaru)	Masahiro Higuchi	36.9%
19	May 10, 1987	"Great Migration" (大移動, Dai-idō)	Yoshiki Nishimura	35.0%
20	May 17, 1987	"Decisive Battle, Suriagehara" (決戦、摺上原, Kessen, Suriagehara)	Yoshiyuki Yoshimura	44.7%
21	May 24, 1987	"A Mother's Strife" (修羅の母, Shura no Haha)	Yoshiyuki Yoshimura	36.5%
22	May 31, 1987	"Kill My Younger Brother" (弟を斬る, Otōto wo Kiru)	Masahiro Higuchi	38.6%
23	June 7, 1987	"To Odawara" (小田原へ, Odawara e)	Masahiro Higuchi	39.9%
24	June 14, 1987	"Ruler of the Nation" (天下人, Tenkabito)	Yoshiyuki Yoshimura	39.2%
25	June 21, 1987	"Mego as Hostage" (人質、めご, Hitojichi, Mego)	Yoshiyuki Yoshimura	37.2%
26	June 28, 1987	"Desperate Situation" (絶体絶命, Zettai Zetsumei)	Yoshiki Nishimura	39.7%
27	July 5, 1987	"Golden Cross" (黄金の十字架, Ōgon no Jūjika)	Yoshiki Nishimura	37.1%
28	July 12, 1987	"Competition of Wits" (知恵くらべ, Chie Kurabe)	Masahiro Higuchi	45.5%
29	July 19, 1987	"Demotion" (左遷, Sasen)	Masahiro Higuchi	41.0%
30	July 26, 1987	"Dandy" (伊達者, Datesha)	Yoshiyuki Yoshimura	35.1%
31	August 2, 1987	"Blessed With Children" (子宝, Kodakara)	Yoshiyuki Yoshimura	36.3%
32	August 9, 1987	"Hidetsugu's Downfall" (秀次失脚, Hidetsugu Shikkyaku)	Yoshiki Nishimura	35.2%
33	August 16, 1987	"False Accusations" (濡れ衣, Nureginu)	Masahiro Higuchi	37.5%
34	August 23, 1987	"Taikō's Death" (太閤の死, Taikō no Shi)	Yoshiyuki Yoshimura	36.8%
35	August 30, 1987	"Shigezane Disappears" (成実失踪, Shigezane Shissō)	Yoshiyuki Yoshimura	36.6%
36	September 6, 1987	"Decisive Battle" (天下分け目, Tenka Wakeme)	Yoshiki Nishimura	36.9%
37	September 13, 1987	"One Million Koku Fantasy" (幻の百万石, Maboroshi no Hyakuman-goku)	Akio Suwabe	43.0%
38	September 20, 1987	"Sendai Castle Construction" (仙台築城, Sendai Chikujō)	Yukinori Kida	39.7%
39	September 27, 1987	"Iroha Marries" (五郎八、嫁ぐ, Iroha, Totsugu)	Yoshiyuki Yoshimura	38.8%
40	October 4, 1987	"Great Shipbuilding" (大船造り, Ōfuna-zukuri)	Yoshiyuki Yoshimura	32.9%
41	October 11, 1987	"Embarking Overseas" (海外雄飛, Kaigai Hiyū)	Masahiro Higuchi	41.3%
42	October 18, 1987	"Attack on Ōsaka" (大坂攻め, Ōsaka-zeme)	Masahiro Higuchi	42.3%
43	October 25, 1987	"Neko, To Uwajima" (ねこ、宇和島へ, Neko, Uwajima e)	Yukinori Kida	43.7%
44	November 1, 1987	"Ōsaka's Summer Siege" (大坂夏の陣, Ōsaka Natsu no Jin)	Yoshiyuki Yoshimura	40.8%
45	November 8, 1987	"Two Fathers" (ふたりの父, Futari no Chichi)	Akio Suwabe	44.1%
46	November 15, 1987	"Divorce Notice" (離縁状, Rienjō)	Masahiro Higuchi	41.5%
47	November 22, 1987	"Vice Shōgun of the World" (天下の副将軍, Tenka no Fuku-shōgun)	Yukinori Kida	38.9%
48	November 29, 1987	"Date-style Perverseness" (伊達流へそ曲がり, Date-ryū Hesomagari)	Yoshiyuki Yoshimura	40.7%
49	December 6, 1987	"I Miss My Mother" (母恋い, Hahagoi)	Yoshiyuki Yoshimura	44.2%
50	December 13, 1987	"Peaceful Death" (大往生, Daiōjō)	Masahiro Higuchi	47.8%
Average rating 39.7% - Rating is based on Japanese Video Research (Kantō region).

== See also ==
- Sengoku period
