= Yoshihime =

Mother of Date Masamune

Yoshihime 義姫
- Born: 1548
- Died: August 13, 1623
- Other names: Ohigashi-no-Kata (お東の方); Hoshunin (保春院).
- Spouse: Date Terumune
- Children: Date Masamune; Date Kojiro; Chikohime; Senshihime
- Parent: Mogami Yoshimori
- Relatives: Mogami Yoshiaki (brother); Onamihime (sister-in-law); Megohime (daughter-in-law)
- Family: Mogami clan Date clan

Yoshihime (義姫, 1548 – August 13, 1623) was a Japanese noble lady and aristocrat from the Sengoku period. She was a daughter of Mogami Yoshimori from the Mogami clan, she married Date Terumune and gave birth to Date Masamune. Yoshihime became known as the Demon Princess of the Ouu (奥 羽 の 鬼 姫) due to her personality and her attempts to usurp the power of the Date clan.

== Life ==
Yoshihime was born at Yamagata Castle in Dewa province. When she married Date Terumune, she continued to help the Mogami clan in many ways. She and her brother Mogami Yoshiaki sent many letters to each other, maintaining a good relationship between them. In 1567 she gave birth to Date Masamune, in the following years she gave birth to Date Kojirou, Chikohime and Senshihime.

=== Conflicts with the Date Clan ===
She hated her firstborn, Masamune, because of his one-eyed condition, and favored his younger brother Kojirou to succeed clan leadership. The conflicts with Yoshihime got worse when she passed on information to her relatives in the Mogami Clan, even when they were fighting against the Date Clan.

In 1578, Date Terumune teamed with other clans at Kaminoyama Castle to attack Mogami Yoshiaki. Yoshihime after learning that her husband had entered battle against her brother, she went on a palaquim to the battlefield, holding a spear, she stood in front of the two armies and forced them to make a peace treaty. She manages to maintain a peace treaty between the two clans. During this time, Yoshiaki continued to seize territories near the Date clan, Yoshihime was aware of her brother's ambition to conquer Tohoku, it is said that she actively assisted him in the plan to kill the leader of the Kaminoyama clan.

In 1584, Masamune succeeded the Date family. In 1585 Terumune was killed by Nihonmatsu Yoshitsugu and she became a widow. Yoshihime suspected Masamune had murdered Terumune to usurp his influence, so she decided to kill Masamune to allow Kojirou to become leader of the Date clan. During this time she was on the warpath with Katakura Kita who was Masamune's mentor and wet nurse.

After Terumune's death, Masamune began to advance in various places, he attacked the Shiomatsu clan who was a close ally of the Mogami clan. Mogami Yoshiaki and Masamune strengthened vigilance to initiate a new invasion, conflicts between Date-Mogami was more serious. This exacerbated Yoshihime's position throughout the Date family. Masamune's attacks made Yoshihime uncomfortable, several clans from Mutsu Province allied to defeat Masamune, including the Nikaido clan, where Onamihime (Date Terumune's sister and Masamune's aunt) was the leader.

At the Battle of Ozaki in 1588, Masamune moved to attack the Ozaki clan, who were allies of Mogami. Yoshiaki sent reinforcements and surrounded Masamune. Under these circumstances, Yoshihime boarded the battlefield again and stood in between the two armies asking them both to retreat. This time she did this to save her son from her brother, and just as in 1578 her plan worked and the Date army retreated without damage. Yoshiaki felt the peace request was a humiliation, but could not refuse his sister's request. For this reason, both sides are peaceful after the truce for about 80 days. After that, Yoshiaki tried to mediate between Date and Ozaki, but Date was unsuccessful because of distrust.

At this time, Yoshiaki asked Yoshihime to take office, revealing that Yoshihime had the confidence of her brother and had the right to speak in the Date family.

=== The Odawara Incident ===
In 1590, when Masamune was participating in Toyotomi Hideyoshi's campaign against the Later Hōjō clan at the Siege of Odawara, Yoshihime personally brought Masamune a meal laced with poison. Though Masamune consumed the poison, he was able to counteract it with the antidote. It is reported that the confrontation between the mother and the child reached the peak by this matter, and Masamune killed his younger brother Date Kojiro himself.

Even after the murder of Kojiro, Yoshihime remained in the Date family and continued to communicate with her son. There are many theories about the incident, but it is said that Yoshihime was kept in exile. During the time she was in exile, she exchanged letters with her brother and other people. She sent a letter with Korean cotton to Masamune, he was so impressed that he tried to approach his mother.

=== Departure and return for the Date clan ===
In 1594 Toyotomi Hideyoshi ordered the lords of each clan to send their families to Kyoto. Megohime who was Masamune's wife went with Katakura Kita. On November 4, Yoshihime went to Kyoto and then returned to the Mogami clan at Yamagata Castle.

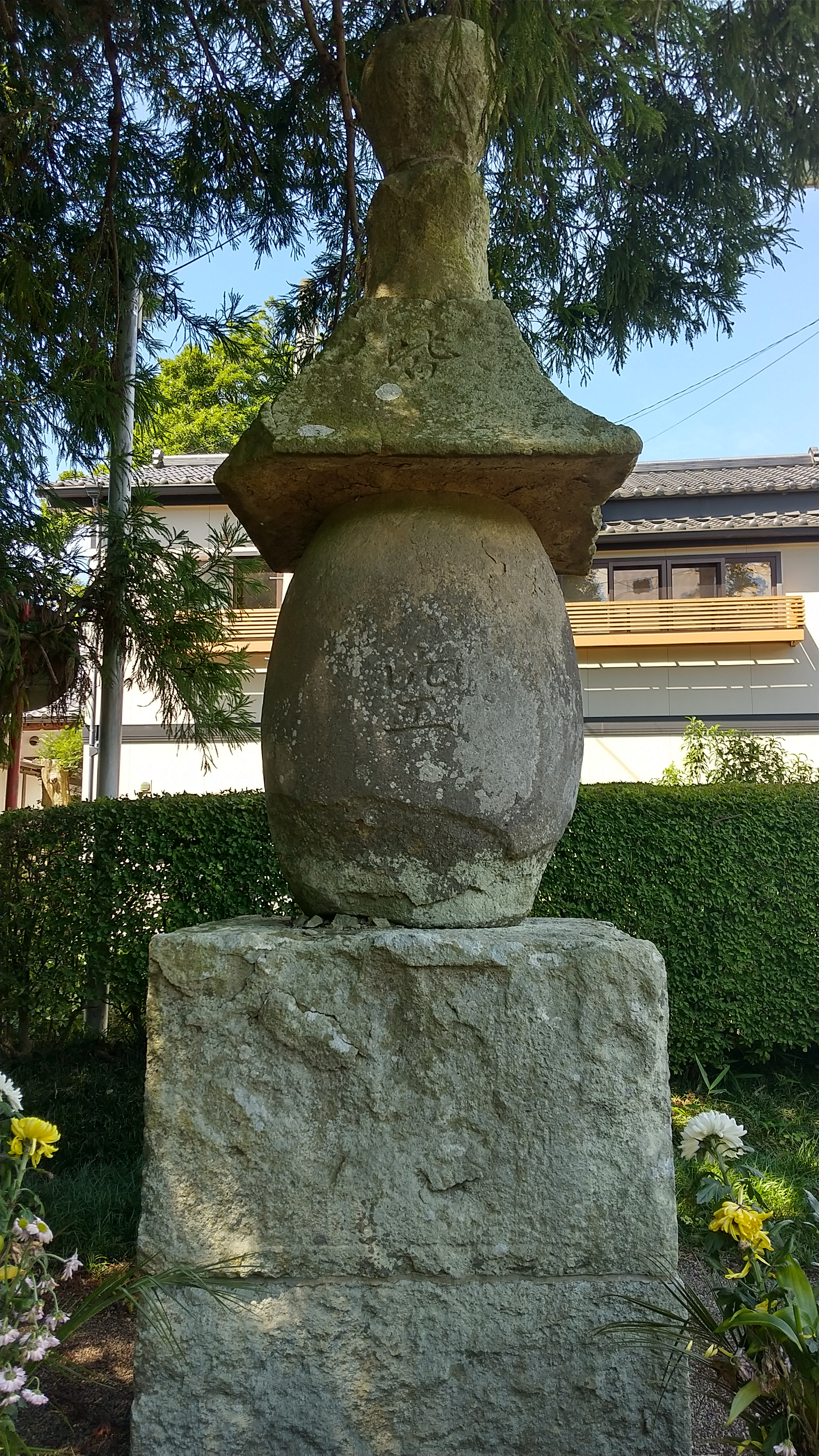
Yoshihime's tomb at Kakuban-ji temple (Sendai).

In 1600, the Sekigahara Campaign began. At this time, Masamune received reinforcements from Mogami Yoshiaki at Yoshihime's request. Katakura Kagetsuna advised Masamune to wait for the enemy army to be exhausted. The Uesugi clan attacked the Kaminoyama castle that was defended by the Mogami clan, Naoe Kanetsugu manages to take the castle and Mogami's army fled. Masamune sent reinforcements to the security of Yoshihime who was in the middle of the battle. In the Siege of Hasedō, Yoshiaki fights alongside Date clan to repel Uesugi from Yamagata. Tokugawa Ieyasu wins at the Battle of Sekigahara and Uesugi Retreat. After the war, Yoshihime sent a letter of thanks to Masamune.

With Yoshiaki's death in 1614, Yoshihime lost her whole family. Later, when the Mogami clan was restructured in 1622 after internal conflicts, Yoshihime could no longer maintain her status in the Mogami clan, and asked Masamune to return to Date, which he allowed. She went to live in Sendai Castle and died a year later in 1623 at the age of 76.

She sent a gift from the Mogami family to Megohime and made peace with Masamume. In the last year of Yoshihime's life, Masamune learned of his mother's intelligence, and letters and poems were exchanged between mother and son. Yoshihime died on August 13, 1623, in Sendai Castle. In Masamune's absence, a funeral was held for her.

== In popular culture ==
=== Drama ===
- In the NHK taiga drama Dokuganryū Masamune, she is portrayed by Shima Iwashita.

=== Games ===
- Yoshihime is a playable character in Nobunaga's Ambition
- She is a generic officer in Samurai Warriors 4 Empires
