= Nihonmatsu Castle =

Castle in Fukushima Prefecture, Japan

Nihonmatsu Castle 二本松城
- Nihonmatsu, Fukushima Prefecture, Japan
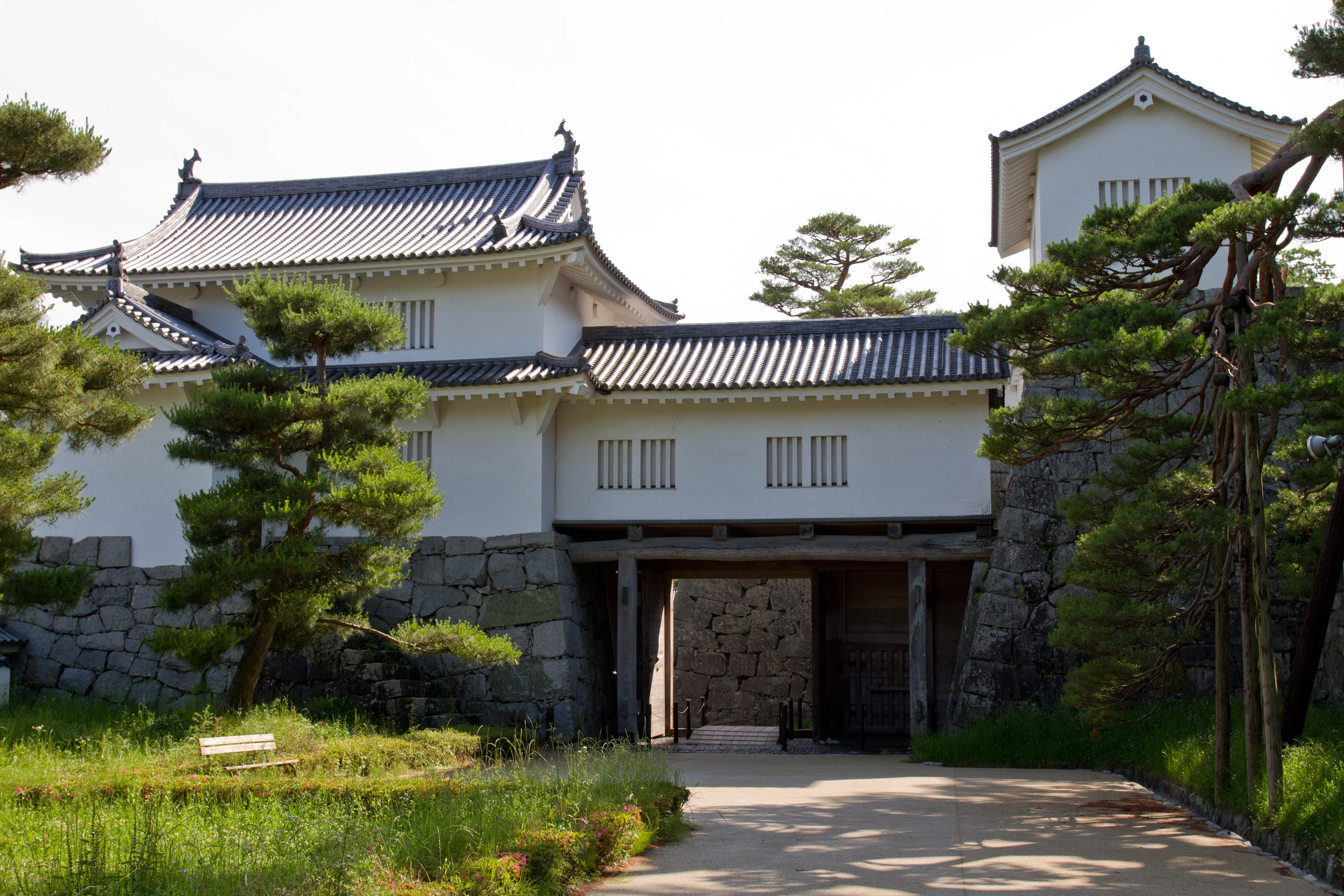
- Main Gate of Nihonmatsu Castle

Site information
- Type: hilltop-style Japanese castle
- Open to the public: yes
- Condition: partially reconstructed 1982

Location
- NIhonmatsu Castle Nihonmatsu Castle 二本松城 (Japan)
- Coordinates: 37°35′59″N 140°25′41″E

Site history
- Built: 1341, rebuilt 1643
- In use: Edo period
- Demolished: 1872

Nihonmatsu Castle (二本松城, Nihonmatsu-jō) is a Japanese castle located in what is now the city of Nihonmatsu, northern Fukushima Prefecture, Japan. Throughout most of the Edo period, Nihonmatsu Castle was home to the Niwa clan, daimyō of Nihonmatsu Domain. The castle was also known as "Kasumi-ga-jō" (霞ヶ城) or "Shirahata-jō" (白旗城). The castle is one of the 100 Fine Castles of Japan, and in 2007 was designated a National Historic Site. The castle grounds are also a noted venue for viewing sakura in spring.

== Situation ==
Nihonmatsu Castle is located on a spur of the Adatara mountains, approximately halfway between the cities of Fukushima and Kōriyama, along the Abukuma River. The Ōshū Kaidō highway connecting Edo with northern Japan passes through this location, which is in a narrow valley beside the river in front of the castle, and thus this location was of critical strategic importance. The main enclosure of the castle was originally located on top of the hill, with secondary enclosures around the base; however, following the destruction of the main enclosure during battles of the late Sengoku period, the castle was rebuilt at the base of the hill.

== History ==
=== Muromachi and Sengoku periods ===
A fortification was erected on the site of Nihonmatsu Castle during the Muromachi period. In 1341, Hatakeyama Takakuni, who was appointed Ōshū tandai by Ashikaga shogunate, established a fortified residence at this location, and changed his name to "Nihonmatsu". However, despite his title, he was relatively powerless against the local Date clan and Ashina clan, whose territories surrounded his domain. Nihonmatsu Mitsuyasu rebuilt Nihonmatsu Castle in the early 15th century.

In 1568, Nihonmatsu Yoshitsugu was attacked by Date Terumune, the father of the famous Date Masamune. Outnumbered and defeated, he pretended to surrender, but in 1585 instead took Terumune hostage. Masamune’s forces counterattacked, and in the ensuring battle both Nihonmatsu Yoshitsugu and Date Terumune were killed.

The Date clan then fought the Battle of Hitotoribashi in 1586 against a group of adventurers from the Satake, Ashina, Iwaki and Ishikawa clans from Hitachi province, who had sought to take advantage of the weakness of Nihonmatsu to seize the territory for themselves. The following year, Date Masamune once again attacked Nihonmatsu. The son of Hatakeyama Yoshitsugu set the castle on fire and fled to Aizu. The castle was then rebuilt by Date Masamune as a key fortification of his border against the Ashina clan, and he assigned his general Katakura Kagetsuna as castellan. He was later replaced by Masamune’s cousin, Date Shigezane. After the defeat of the Ashina, the Date clan became the most powerful clan in the Tōhoku region of Japan. However, with the rise of Toyotomi Hideyoshi, the clan was forced to submit and the Nihonmatsu area was surrendered in 1589 to Hideyoshi’s favorite, Gamō Ujisato, who ruled the 900,000 koku Aizu Domain. After Gamō Ujisato died, his territories were assigned to Uesugi Kagekatsu, who also ruled from Aizu. However, the Uesugi sided with the pro-Toyotomi faction in the Battle of Sekigahara and their territories were substantially reduced by Tokugawa Ieyasu after the formation of the Tokugawa shogunate.

=== Edo period ===
Under the Tokugawa shogunate, the castle was briefly assigned to the Matsushita clan, a branch of the Gamō clan until 1627. The territory was then assigned to Kato Yoshiakira, one of the heroes of the Battle of Shizugatake and builder of Matsuyama Castle in Iyo Province. In 1643, the Niwa clan was transferred to become daimyō of Nihonmatsu Domain. The Niwa abandoned the old fortifications at the top of the hill, and completely rebuilt the castle at its base, from which they ruled until the Meiji restoration.

During the Boshin War, Nihonmatsu Domain joined the pro-Tokugawa Ōuetsu Reppan Dōmei, and was the site of the Battle of Nihonmatsu as part of the overall Aizu campaign. During the struggle, the castle fell after a single day to the superior firepower of the modernized Satchō Alliance forces of the new Meiji government, during which 337 samurai from Nihonmatsu and 206 samurai from allied domains were killed and much of the castle was destroyed.

=== Modern era ===
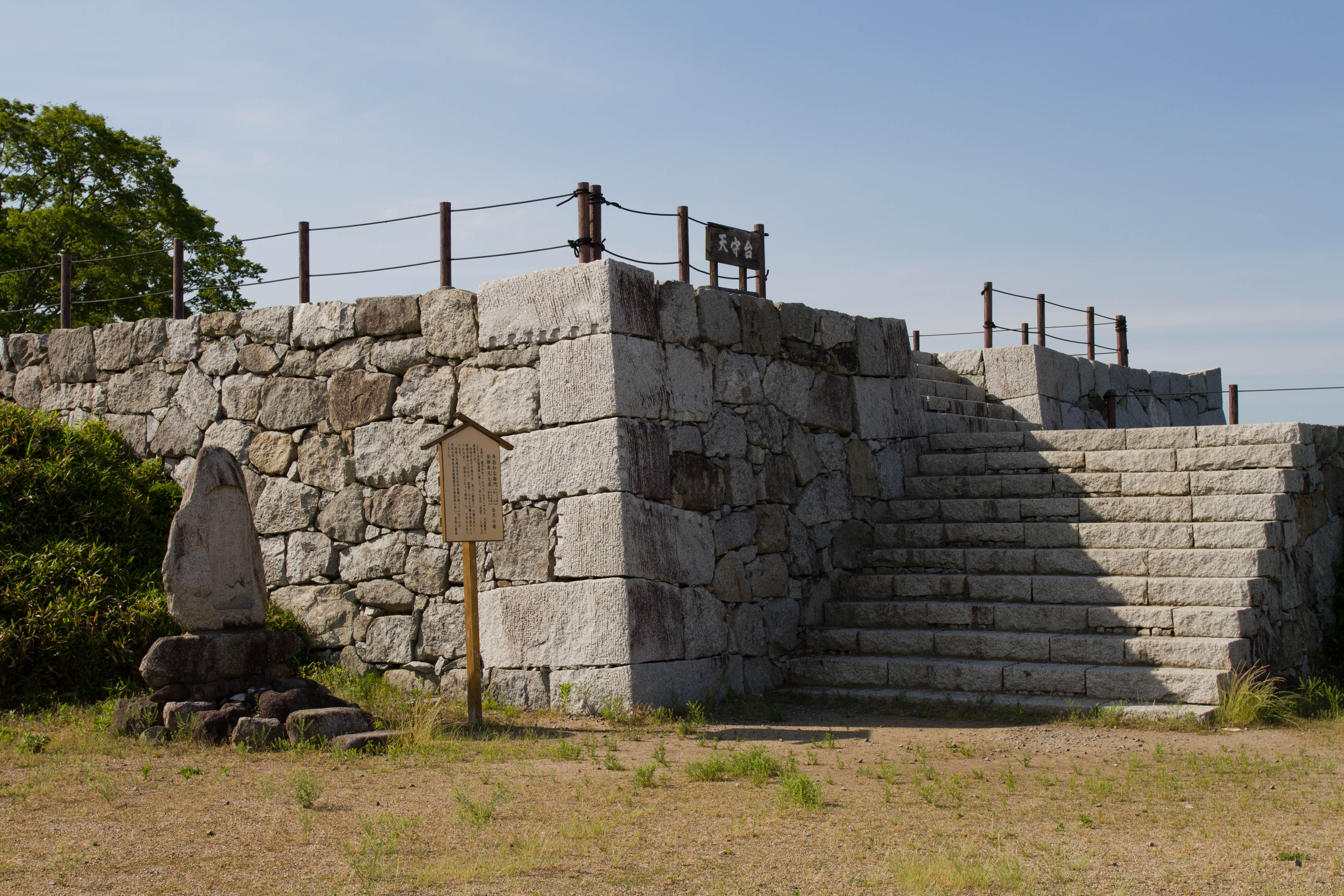
Stone base of the main tenshu

As with many Japanese castles, in 1872, subsequent to the Meiji restoration the remaining castle structures were destroyed and the site was transformed into a park. The site, called Kasumigajō Park (霞ヶ城公園, Kasumigajō-kōen) became famous for its sakura blossoms in spring, and a festival featuring dolls made from chrysanthemum flowers in autumn.

In 1982, the Minowa gate and an attached yagura turret were reconstructed, and stone walls were repaired. The foundation stone base of the main tenshu was restored in 1993. The area was granted government protection as a National Historic Site in 2007.

== See also ==
- List of Historic Sites of Japan (Fukushima)

== Literature ==
- Schmorleitz, Morton S. (1974). Castles in Japan. Tokyo: Charles E. Tuttle Co. pp. 144–145. ISBN 0-8048-1102-4.
- De Lange, William (2021). An Encyclopedia of Japanese Castles. Groningen: Toyo Press. p. 600. ISBN 978-9492722300.
- Motoo, Hinago (1986). Japanese Castles. Tokyo: Kodansha. p. 200 pages. ISBN 0-87011-766-1.
- Mitchelhill, Jennifer (2004). Castles of the Samurai: Power and Beauty. Tokyo: Kodansha. p. 112 pages. ISBN 4-7700-2954-3.
- Turnbull, Stephen (2003). Japanese Castles 1540-1640. Osprey Publishing. p. 64 pages. ISBN 1-84176-429-9.
