= Kōriyama Campaign =

Series of battles in 1588

- Part of the Sengoku period
Date	February–July 1588
Location	Adachi and Asaka Districts, Mutsu Province, Ashikaga shogunate
Result	peace, Date clan effective victory

Belligerents
Date clan	Ashina clan Sōma clan

Commanders and leaders
Date Masamune; Date Shigezane; Katakura Kagetsuna; Ōuchi Sadatsuna	Ashina Yoshihiro; Sōma Yoshitane; Ishikawa Mitsumasa; Satake Yoshishige

Strength
Unknown	Unknown

Casualties and losses
Unknown	Unknown

The Kōriyama Campaign (郡山合戦, Kōriyama Gassen) was a series of battles between February and July in 1588 between the Date clan and combined forces from the Ashina and Sōma clans over the areas around Kōriyama Castle and Kubota Castle in Adachi and Asaka Districts in Mutsu Province during the Ashikaga shogunate in Japan. Some accounts indicate it began following the invasion of territory belonging to the Tamura clan in April 1588 after turmoil caused by the death of Tamura Kiyoaki in 1586.

The conflicts were settled in July 1588, with the Date clan having an effective victory.

== Works cited ==
- 泉田邦彦; 今泉徹; 坂本正仁; 柴裕之; 関周一; 高橋修; 中根正人; 森木悠介 (26 March 2021). 佐々木倫郎; 千葉篤志 (eds.). 戦国佐竹氏研究の最前線 (in Japanese). Tōkyō: Yamakawa Shuppansha. ISBN 978-4-634-15181-9. NCID BC06499277, NAID 110007707970, JPNO 23512961, NDLBibID:031345101.
- 垣内和孝 (Kazutaka Kakiuchi) (15 September 2017). 伊達政宗と南奥の戦国時代 [Date Masamune and the Sengoku Period in Southern Mutsu Province] (in Japanese). Yoshikawa Kōbunkan. ISBN 978-4-642-02938-4.
