= Takamoto =

Takamoto is a Japanese surname and given name.

Notable people with the surname include:

- Iwao Takamoto (1925–2007), Japanese-American animator
- Megumi Takamoto (born 1985), Japanese voice actress and singer
- Norifumi Takamoto (born 1967), Japanese footballer

Notable people with the given name include:

- Takamoto Katsuta (born 1993), Japanese rally driver
- Moniwa Takamoto (1854–1919), Japanese samurai
- Mōri Takamoto (1523–1563), Japanese feudal lord

== See also ==
- Takemoto, also a Japanese surname
