= Ishikawa Akimitsu =

- 石川 昭光
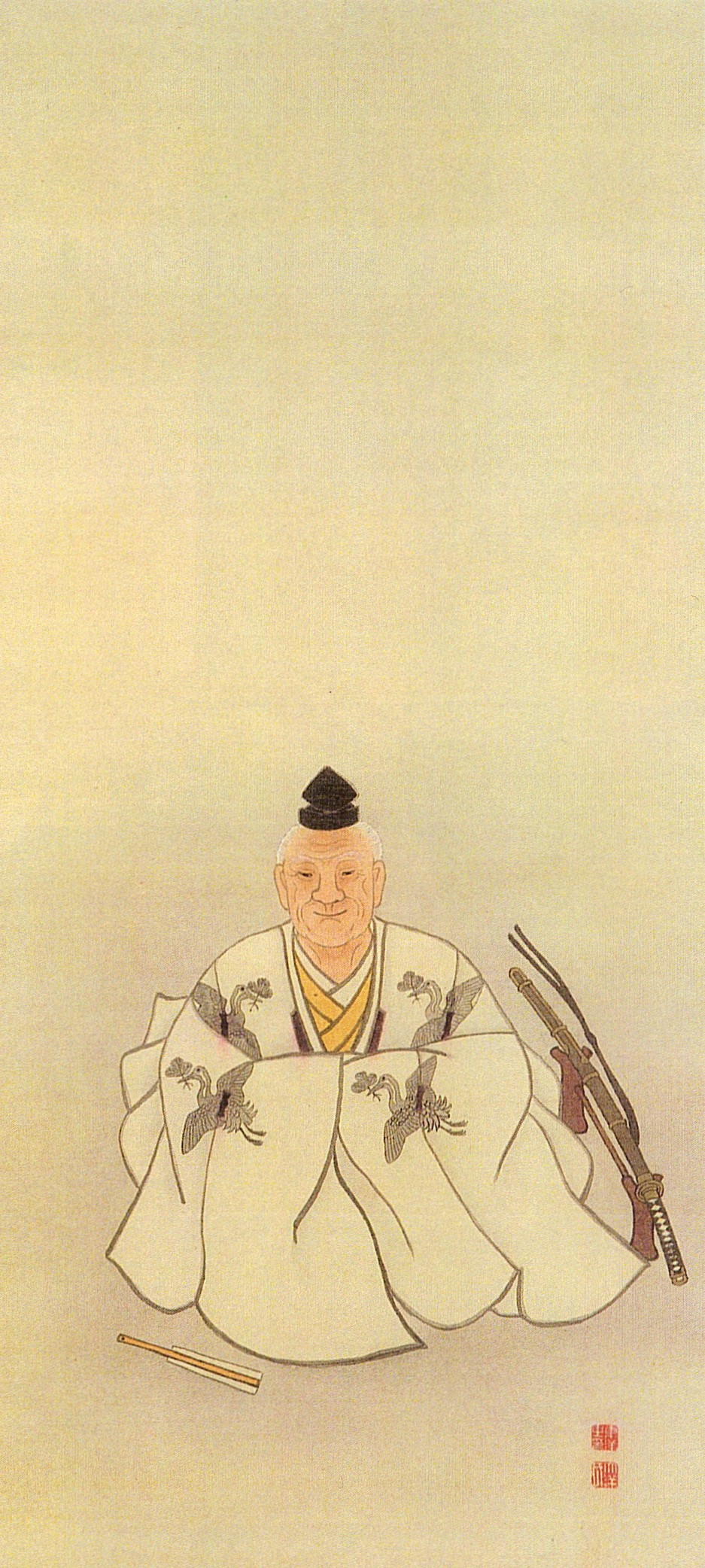
- Born: Kojiro; 1550
- Died: August 16, 1622 (aged 71–72)
- Relatives: Date Harumune (father); Ishikawa Harumitsu (adopted father)
- Military career
- Allegiance: Date clan
- Unit: Mutsu-Ishikawa clan
- Conflicts: Korean campaign (1592-1598); Osaka Campaign (1614-1615)

Ishikawa Akimitsu (石川 昭光; 1550 – August 16, 1622), also known as Kojiro or Jirō (次郎) or by his court title, Yamato no Kami (大和守), was a Japanese samurai of the Sengoku period through early Edo period. He served the Date clan of Sendai han during the tenure of its lord Masamune.

Akimitsu was born in 1550 as Kojiro, the fourth son of Date Harumune. His siblings included Rusu Masakage and Date Terumune, Masamune's father.

In 1563, Ishikawa Harumitsu, the twenty-fifth head of the Mutsu-Ishikawa clan, adopted Kojiro (later, he was renamed Ishikawa Akimitsu). Harumitsu handed over the head of the Mutsu-Ishikawa family to Akimitsu and retired.

After the destruction of the Ashina clan in Tenshō 17 (1589), he came under Masamune's command. In Masamune's service, Akimitsu was acknowledged as chief among the heads of the Date clan's cadet branches, or ichimon-hittō (一門衆筆頭). He served in the Korean campaign, as well as the Osaka campaign.

In 1598, Akimitsu was entrusted with Kakuda Castle, which came with a stipend of 10,000 koku.
