= Oniniwa Tsunamoto =

- 鬼庭 綱元
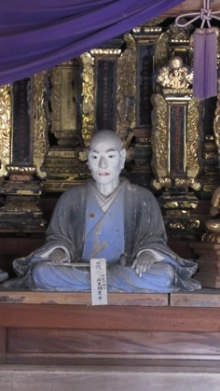
- Born: 1549
- Died: July 13, 1640 (aged 90–91)
- Military career
- Allegiance: Date clan
- Unit: Oniniwa clan
- Conflicts: Battle of Kōriyama; Battle of Suriagehara; Siege of Sukagawa; Kunohe Rebellion; Korean Campaign; Sekigahara Campaign; Battle of Matsukawa

Oniniwa Tsunamoto (鬼庭 綱元; 1549 – July 13, 1640) was a Japanese samurai of the late Sengoku period through early Edo period. He was retainer of the Date clan of Sendai. Together with Katakura Kagetsuna and Date Shigezane, Tsunamoto was known as one of the "Three Great Men of the Date Clan".

== Biography ==
Tsunamoto was the son of Oniniwa Yoshinao. His half-sister, Katakura Kita was also Katakura Kagetsuna's half sister. Tsunamoto served the Date clan, and by the end of his life was the only Date retainer who was both older than and outlived Date Masamune.

Tsunamoto succeeded to the family headship following the death of his father at the Battle of Hitotoribashi in 1586. He fought at the Battle of Suriagehara in 1589, participated in suppression of the Kunohe Rebellion in 1591, and then served with the Korean campaign in 1592. Tsunamoto, deeply trusted by Masamune, was made a senior retainer at the young age of 35.

After the Bunroku Campaign, Hideyoshi suspected Masamune of treason, it was Tsunamoto who pleaded on his lord's behalf. His conduct was said to have impressed Hideyoshi so much that he gave him one of his concubines as a reward, though this remains unconfirmed. Another story has Tsunamoto change his name to "Moniwa Nobumoto" (茂庭延元) to placate the Taikō; according to sources, Hideyoshi was superstitious of the "Oniniwa" name because of its meaning, "the garden of the demon".

After spending several years as an attendant for Masamune's son Hidemune, Tsunamoto retired from the Date clan and became a Buddhist monk. After his death, he was succeeded by his son, Moniwa Yoshimoto (Yoshitsuna) (1575–1663).

== Descendants ==
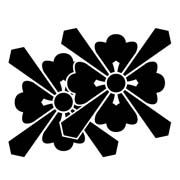
Oniniwa clan Mon

- Moniwa Masumoto
- Moniwa Takamoto (1854–1919)

== In fiction ==
In NHK's 1987 Taiga drama Dokuganryū Masamune, Tsunamoto was played by Takehiro Murata.
