= Katakura Kagetsuna =

Daimyo

- 片倉 景綱
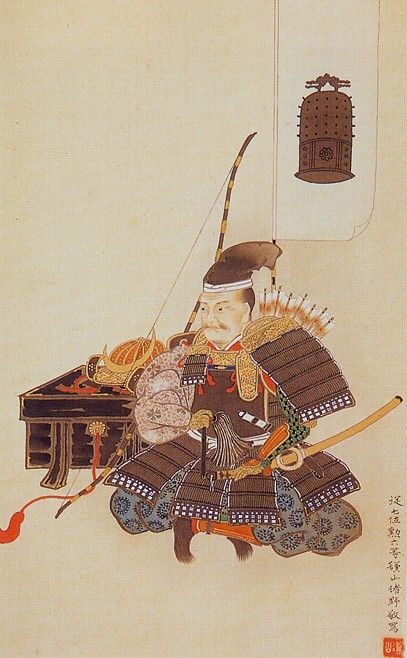

Head of Katakura clan
- In office ?–1615
- Preceded by: Katakura Kageshige
- Succeeded by: Katakura Shigenaga

Personal details
- Born: 1557
- Died: December 4, 1615 (aged 57–58)
- Parent: Katakura Kagenaga (father)
- Nickname: "Ogre Kojūrō"

Military service
- Allegiance: Date clan
- Unit: Katakura clan
- Commands: Shiroishi Castle
- Battles/wars: Battle of Hitotoribashi; Battle of Kōriyama; Battle of Suriagehara; Siege of Sukagawa; Kunohe Rebellion; Korean Campaign; Sekigahara Campaign; Battle of Matsukawa; Osaka Campaign

Katakura Kagetsuna (片倉 景綱; 1557 – December 4, 1615) was a Japanese samurai of the Katakura clan during the late Sengoku period. Also known by his court title, Bichū no Kami (備中守), or more commonly, as Katakura Kojūrō. He was retainer of the Date clan of Sendai. Together with Oniniwa Tsunamoto and Date Shigezane, Kagetsuna was known as one of the "Three Great Men of the Date Clan".

== Early life ==
Kagetsuna was the son of Yonezawa native Katakura Kagenaga (a Shinto priest turned samurai), he was famed for his role as a senior retainer under Date Masamune.

Kagetsuna was trained by his half sister, Katakura Kita, who played a crucial role in the success of the Katakura clan. He first served the Date clan as a junior page under Date Masamune's father Terumune. Then, on Endō Motonobu's recommendation, he became Masamune's personal attendant, and was heavily relied upon as a strategist. Kagetsuna would soon become deeply trusted by his lord, as the following anecdote illustrates: Masamune, in his first battle, suddenly found himself surrounded; he was only saved when Kagetsuna arrived on the scene shouting "I am Masamune!" (われこそが政宗なり; Ware koso ga Masamune nari), distracting the enemy long enough for Masamune to escape.

== Military life ==
Kagetsuna fought in most of Masamune's major battles, including the Battle of Hitotoribashi in 1586, the Kōriyama Campaigns in 1588, Battle of Suriagehara in 1589, Kunohe Rebellion in 1591, the Korean campaign in 1592, and Sekigahara in 1600.

He also assisted in the Date clan's administrative duties, serving as castle warden of Nihonmatsu Castle, lord of Ōmori Castle, Watari Castle, and others. Kagetsuna played a key role in the survival of the Date clan in 1590, by recommending that Masamune submit to Toyotomi Hideyoshi during the Odawara Campaign. Following the Odawara Campaign, Hideyoshi granted Kagetsuna the 50,000 koku fief of Tamura. This made Kagetsuna a daimyō in his own right; however, soon after taking possession of the fief, he returned it, in a show of loyalty to his master.

Later, two years after Sekigahara, when Masamune was made lord of Sendai, Kagetsuna was granted Shiroishi Castle (白石城 Shiroishi-jō), and a stipend of 13,000 koku. This was a special exception to the Tokugawa Shogunate's newly passed ikkoku ichijō (一国一城; "One Castle per Territory") rule. The Katakura clan, as senior retainers of the Sendai domain, would remain in Shiroishi as local lords for the next two centuries, spanning over 11 generations.

As Kagetsuna was ill, he was unable to join Masamune at the Osaka Winter Campaign of 1614, choosing to send his son Shigenaga in his stead. Later he participated at the Osaka Summer Campaign in 1615. Kagetsuna's son, Shigenaga, taking part in the fierce fighting against Gotō Mototsugu at the Osaka Summer Campaign, earned the nickname Oni Kojūrō (鬼小十郎; "Ogre Kojūrō").

== Death ==
Kagetsuna died the following year at age 60, and was buried with the posthumous name of Sanzan Jōei (傑山常英). Upon Kagetsuna's death, six of his retainers were so deeply grieved that they committed junshi (殉死; suicide to follow one's lord in death).

== Family ==
- Father: Katakura Kagenaga
- Mother: Motosawa Yukinao’s daughter
- Wife: Yanouchi Shigesada’s daughter
- Concubine: Uehara Gohee’s daughter
- Children:
  - daughter
  - Katakura Shigenaga by Yanouchi Shigesada’s daughter
  - Katakura Tomotsuna by Uehara Gohee’s daughter
  - Katakura Yukitsuna by Yanouchi Shigesada’s daughter
  - daughter

== In fiction ==
In NHK's 1987 Taiga drama Dokuganryū Masamune, Kagetsuna was played by Teruhiko Saigō.

== Works cited ==
- 泉田邦彦; 今泉徹; 坂本正仁; 柴裕之; 関周一; 高橋修; 中根正人; 森木悠介 (26 March 2021). 佐々木倫郎; 千葉篤志 (eds.). 戦国佐竹氏研究の最前線 (in Japanese). Tōkyō: Yamakawa Shuppansha. ISBN 978-4-634-15181-9. NCID BC06499277, NAID 110007707970, JPNO 23512961, NDLBibID:031345101.

Preceded by None	Shiroishi-Katakura family head ????–????	Succeeded by Katakura Shigenaga
