= Shiroishi Munezane =

- 白石 宗実
- Munezane's armor
- Born: 1553
- Died: 1599 (aged 45–46)
- Military career
- Allegiance: Date clan
- Unit: Shiroishi clan
- Conflicts: Battle of Suriagehara; Korean campaign

Shiroishi Munezane (白石 宗実; 1553?–1599) was a Japanese samurai of the Sengoku period through Azuchi-Momoyama Period, who served as a retainer of the Date clan. He held the court title of Wakasa no kami.

Munezane first served Date Terumune, taking part in Terumune's later campaigns. After serving Masamune for several years, Munezane received the Shiomatsu region as his personal fief in 1586.

When the Date invaded Aizu three years later, Munezane served under Date Shigezane, who would later play an active role in the Ashina family's defeat. For his distinguished service in this conflict, Munezane was awarded the Mizusawa domain and an income fief of 15,000 koku.

In the 1590s, Munezane went to Korea and fought as part of Toyotomi Hideyoshi's invasion of the Korean peninsula.

Munezane died while at Fushimi, in 1599, at age 46. His adopted son Shiroishi Munenao succeeded him.
