= Endō Motonobu =

Japanese samurai (1532-1585)

Endō Motonobu (遠藤 基信; 1532 – December 12, 1585) was a Japanese samurai of the Sengoku period who served the Date clan. He was also known as Endō Funyūsai (不入斎). Motonobu had supposedly taken up residence at a Buddhist temple during his adult life, and from that point he managed to secure a retainer position under Nakano Munetoki. Motonobu committed suicide after the death of Date Terumune.

== In fiction ==
In NHK's 1987 Taiga drama Dokuganryū Masamune, Motonobu was played by Shigeru Kōyama.
