= Suzuki Motonobu =

Suzuki Motonobu (鈴木元信) (1555–1620) was a Japanese samurai of the Sengoku through early Edo period. A former merchant, he was studying tea ceremony in Kyoto when hired by Date Masamune. Also known as Shichirōemon (七右衛門). He was given the job of treasurer, and was involved in external affairs, as well. Masamune granted Motonobu Furukawa Castle. Motonobu felt that Masamune would achieve overlordship over Japan, and so he began to compose a legal code to prepare for that eventuality. However, as this did not happen, the draft was destroyed as per Motonobu's will.
