= Iwadeyama Castle =

Miyagi Prefecture, Japan

Coordinates: 38°39′21″N 140°51′46″E

- 岩出山城
- Miyagi Prefecture, Japan
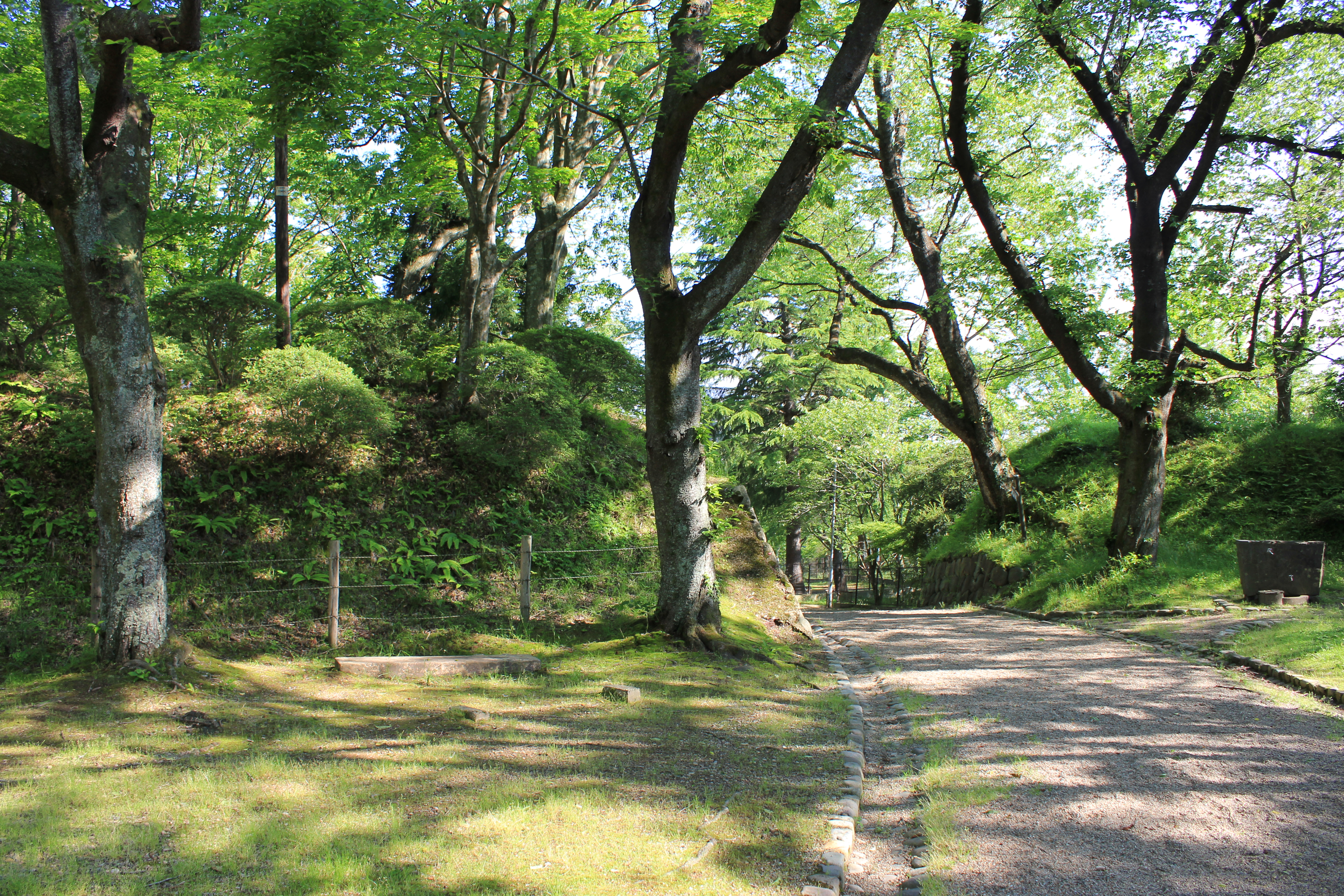
- Former gate of Honmaru compound

Site information
- Type: Mountaintop style castle
- Controlled by: Ujiie clan, Date clan
- Condition: ruins

Location

Site history
- Built: 14c or early 15c
- Built by: Ujiie Naomasu
- Materials: Eathworks
- Demolished: 1868

Garrison information
- Past commanders: Date Masamune

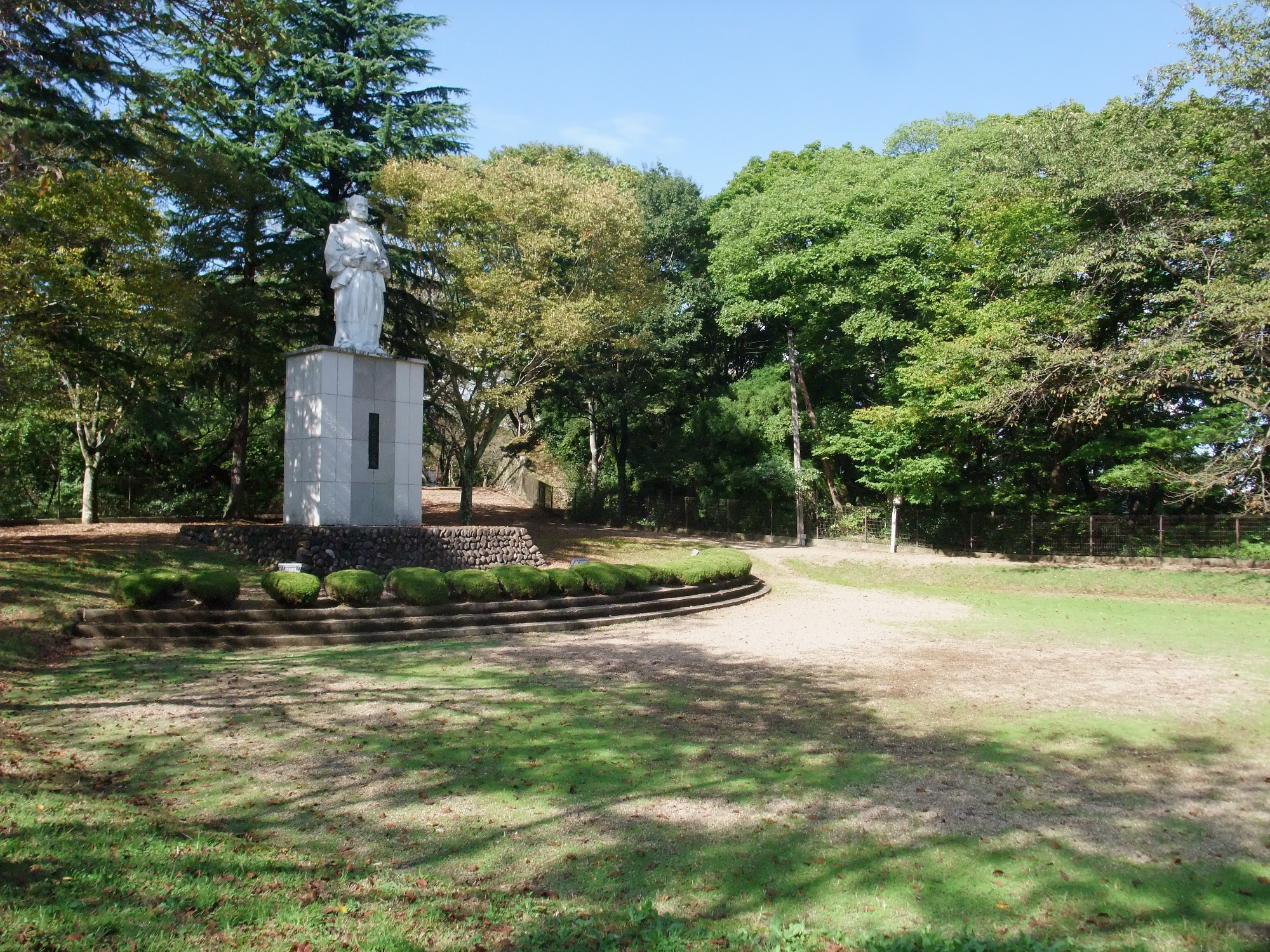
Remains of Inner Gate and statue of Date Masamune.

Iwadeyama Castle (岩出山城, Iwadeyama-jō) was a castle in Ōsaki, Miyagi Prefecture, Japan. After serving Hideyoshi for a time, Date Masamune was given Iwatesawa castle and the surrounding lands as his home domain. Masamune moved there in 1591, rebuilt the castle, renamed it Iwadeyama, and encouraged the growth of a town at its base. Masamune stayed at Iwadeyama for 13 years and turned the region into a major political and economic center.

After the Meiji revolution, all the remaining structures of the castle were removed or destroyed.

== See also ==
- List of castles in Japan
