= Oniniwa Yoshinao =

Japanese samurai

- 鬼庭 良直
- Born: 1513; Akadate Castle, Date District, Fukushima
- Died: January 6, 1586 (aged 72–73); Near Hitotori Bridge in Mutsu Province,(Now Motomiya, Fukushima)
- Relatives: Oniniwa Motozane (father); Oniniwa Tsunamoto (eldest son); Katakura Kita (daughter)
- Military career
- Allegiance: Date clan
- Unit: Oniniwa clan
- Conflicts: Battle of Tenbun; Battle of Hitotoribashi

Oniniwa Yoshinao (鬼庭良直; 1513 – 1586) also known as Oniniwa Sagetsusai was a Japanese samurai of the Sengoku period who served Date clan. He was deeply trusted by Date Terumune and Date Masamune.

Yoshinao at the age of 73, bravely fought to let Masamune go during the Battle of Hitotoribashi, His army killed many of Iwaki clan's men but finally was killed by Iwaki Tsunetaka's general Kubota Jūrō. Thanks to Yoshinao, Masamune was able to escape to Motomiya castle. His son, Oniniwa Tsunamoto, and his daughter, Katakura Kita, also worked for Date clan and won Masamune's great trust.

== In fiction ==
In NHK's 1987 Taiga drama Dokuganryū Masamune, Yoshinao was played by Chosuke Ikariya.
