= Date Tanemune =

Daimyo of the Sengoku period

- 伊達 稙宗
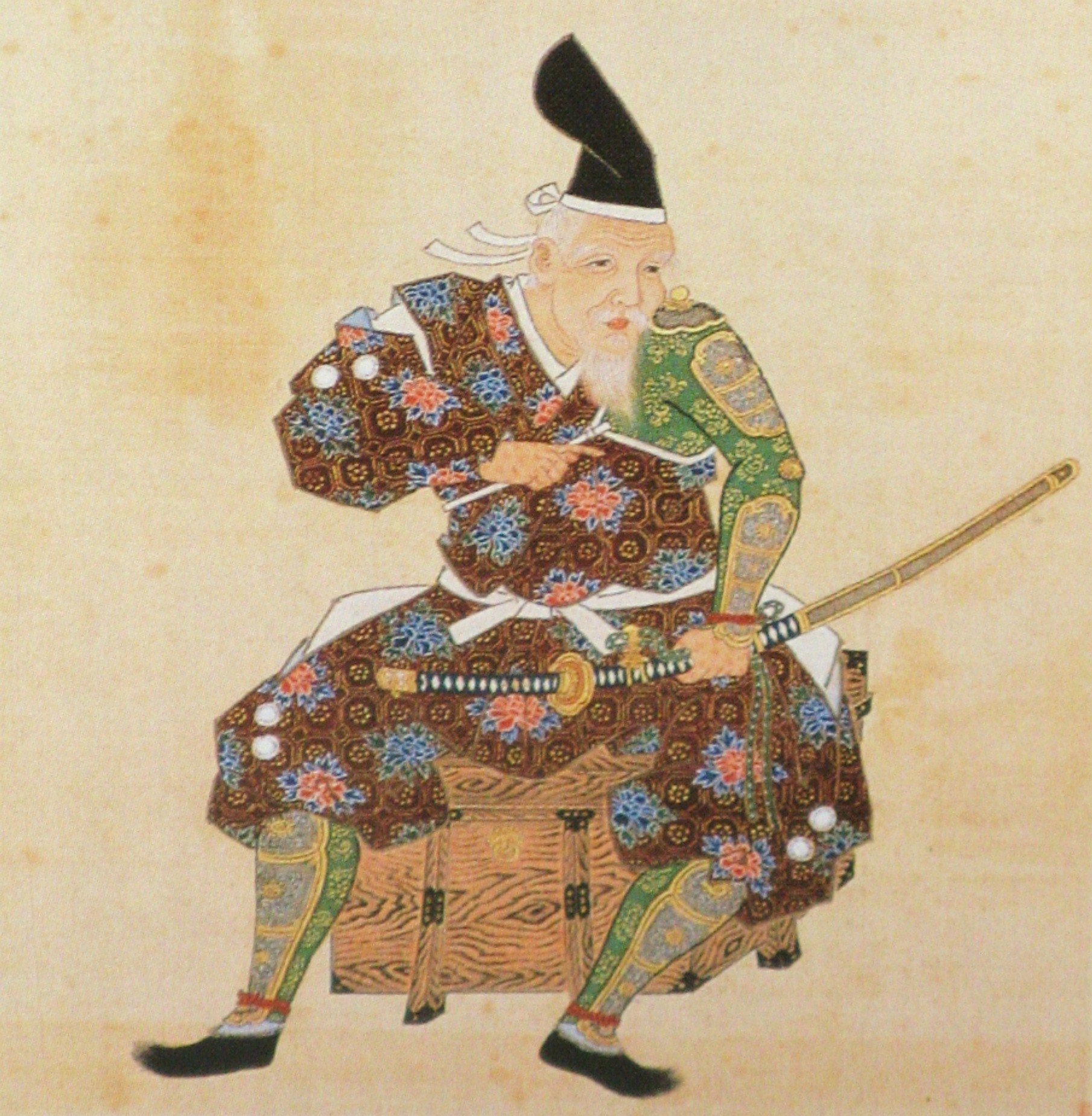

Head of Date clan
- In office 1514–1548
- Preceded by: Date Hisamune
- Succeeded by: Date Harumune

Personal details
- Born: Jiro (次郎); 1488
- Died: July 16, 1565
- Spouse: Teishin'in
- Relations: Nakajo-dono (concubine); Shimodate-dono (concubine); Nakadate-dono (concubine); Watari-dono (concubine); Bo-dono (concubine)
- Children: Date Harumune; Date Sanemoto
- Parents: Date Hisamune (father); Sensu'in (mother)

Military service
- Allegiance: Date clan
- Commands: Mutsu Province
- Battles/wars: Tenbun War

Date Tanemune (伊達 稙宗, DAH-tay; 1488 – July 16, 1565) was a Japanese samurai warrior and Date clan leader during the Sengoku period.

== Biography ==
He was born as the eldest son of Date Hisamune. His childhood name was Jiro (次郎).

At the death of his father, he became daimyō of Mutsu Province.

In 1536, he promulgated the Date provincial code (Jinkaishū).

Tanemune's attempt to have Uesugi Sadazane, the childless head of the Uesugi, adopt Sanemoto and make him his heir, sparked a civil war within the Date known as the Tenbun War from 1542 to 1548 which resulted in Tanemune's replacement as clan head by his eldest son, Harumune.

== Family ==
The emblem (mon) of the Date clan

- Father: Date Hisamune (1453–1514)
- Mother: Sensu'in (d. 1513)
- Wife: Teishin'in
- Concubines:
  - Nakajo-dono
  - Shimodate-dono
  - Nakadate-dono
  - Watari-dono
  - Bo-dono
- Children:
  - daughter married Souma Akitane by Teishin'in
  - daughter by Teishin'in
  - daughter married Ashina Moriuji
  - Date Harumune by Teishin'in
  - Date Genbanmaru by Teishin'in
  - Osaki Yoshinobu (1526–1550) by Teishin'in
  - Date Sanemoto (1527–1587) by Nakajo-dono
  - daughter married Nikaido Teruyuki by Shimodate-dono
  - daughter married Tamura Takaaki by Shimodate-dono
  - Date Munetoshi by Shimodate-dono
  - Daughter married Kakketa Toshimune by Shimodate-dono
  - Yanagawa Munekiyo (1532–1605) by Nakadate-dono
  - Ogata Yasuaji by Nakadate-dono
  - Watari Motomune (1530–1594) by Watari-dono
  - Watari Tsunamune by Watari-dono
  - Kori Munesada by Bo-dono
  - Kasai Ushisarumaru by Bo-dono
  - Gorakuin Munesake by Bo-dono
  - Date Shichiro by Bo-dono
  - Kosugo gozen married Sōma Yoshitane (1558-1635) by Bo-dono
