= Sōma Yoshitane (daimyo, born 1548) =

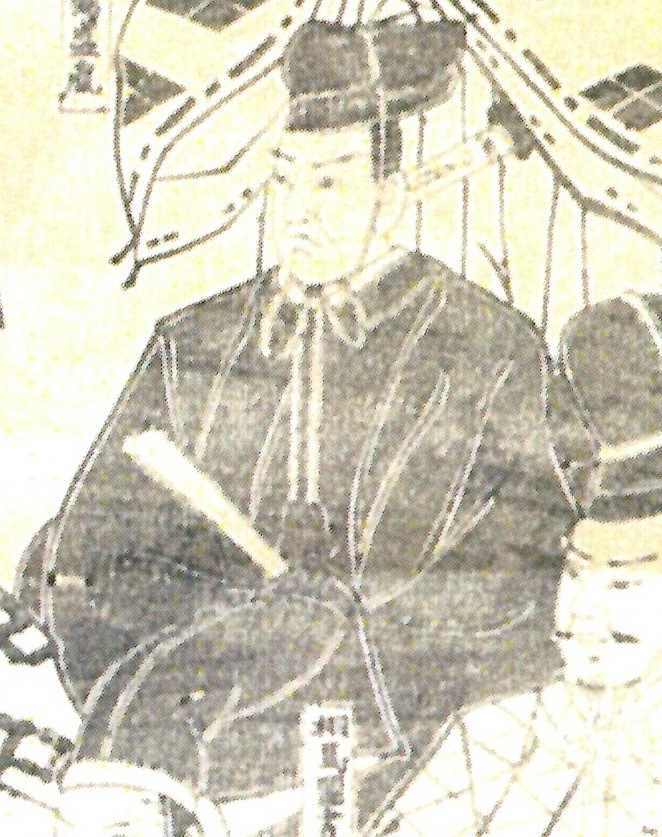
Sōma Yoshitane

Sōma Yoshitane (相馬義胤; 1548–1635) was the 16th hereditary chieftain of the Sōma clan and a Sengoku period daimyō with territories covering the three districts forming the northern Hamadōri region of southern Mutsu Province.

== Biography ==
Yoshitane was the eldest son of Sōma Moritane, the 15th chieftain of the Sōma clan. At the time, the clan was based at Odaka Castle. In 1559, the clan was approached by Date Tanemune and was offered a matrimonial alliance. Yoshitane was wed to Tanemune's younger daughter, Kosugō Gozen the following year. However, following the death of Tanemune in 1565, the ancient enmity between the Sōma and Date clans flared up again in a border dispute, and Yoshitane divorced Kosugō Gozen and sent her back to the Date clan.

Yoshitane fought the Date clan many times, as the Date invaded his domain on 30 occasions, including the prolonged Kōriyama Campaign in 1588. Both Sōma Yoshitane and Date Masamune submitted to Toyotomi Hideyoshi at the Siege of Odawara.

At the time of the Battle of Sekigahara, the Sōma attempted to remain neutral for fear of the powerful Satake clan to the south, which was allied with Ishida Mitsunari through marriage ties. The new Tokugawa shogunate initially decided to seize the Sōma territories, but through the intervention of several senior retainers (including their former arch-enemy Date Masamune), the shogunate relented and appointed Yoshitanes son, Sōma Toshitane as a tozama daimyō over a 60,000 koku Sōma Nakamura Domain which encompassed their traditional holdings.

== Works cited ==
- 泉田邦彦; 今泉徹; 坂本正仁; 柴裕之; 関周一; 高橋修; 中根正人; 森木悠介 (26 March 2021). 佐々木倫郎; 千葉篤志 (eds.). 戦国佐竹氏研究の最前線 (in Japanese). Tōkyō: Yamakawa Shuppansha. ISBN 978-4-634-15181-9. NCID BC06499277, NAID 110007707970, JPNO 23512961, NDLBibID:031345101.
