= Date Masamune =

Japanese samurai and daimyō (1567–1636)

- 伊達 政宗

Head of Date clan
- In office 1584–1636
- Preceded by: Date Terumune
- Succeeded by: Date Tadamune

Daimyō of Sendai Domain
- In office 1600–1636
- Succeeded by: Date Tadamune

Personal details
- Born: Bontenmaru; September 5, 1567 Yonezawa, Yamagata
- Died: June 27, 1636 (aged 68) Edo, Japan
- Spouse: Megohime
- Children: Date Hidemune; Date Tadamune; Irohahime; Muuhime
- Parents: Date Terumune (father); Yoshihime (mother)
- Relatives: Onamihime (aunt); Rusu Masakage (uncle); Ishikawa Akimitsu (uncle); Kokubu Morishige (uncle); Date Shigezane (cousin); Mogami Yoshiaki (maternal uncle)
- Nickname(s): "Dokuganryū"; One-Eyed Dragon of Ōshū

Military service
- Allegiance: Date clan Toyotomi clan Eastern Army; Tokugawa shogunate
- Rank: Daimyo
- Unit: Date clan
- Commands: Sendai domain
- Battles/wars: Battle of Hitotoribashi; Battle of Kōriyama; Siege of Kurokawa; Battle of Suriagehara; Siege of Sukagawa; Kunohe Rebellion; Korean Campaign; Sekigahara Campaign; Battle of Matsukawa; Osaka Campaign

Date Masamune (伊達 政宗; DAH-tay; September 5, 1567 – June 27, 1636) was a Japanese samurai and daimyō during the Azuchi–Momoyama period through the early Edo period. Heir to a long line of powerful feudal lords in the Tōhoku region, he went on to found the modern-day city of Sendai. An outstanding tactician, he was made all the more iconic for his missing eye, as Masamune was often called dokuganryū (独眼竜), or the "One-Eyed Dragon of Ōshū". As a legendary warrior and leader, Masamune is a character in a number of Japanese period dramas.

== Early life and rise ==
Date Masamune was born as Bontenmaru (梵天丸) later Tojirō (藤次郎), as the eldest son of Date Terumune, likely born in Yonezawa Castle (in modern Yamagata Prefecture). At the age of 14 in 1581, Masamune led his first campaign, helping his father fight the Sōma clan. His buddhist name is "Zuiganjiden Teizan Zenri Daikoji". In 1584, at the age of 17, Masamune succeeded his father, Terumune, who chose to retire from his position as daimyō. Masamune's army was recognized by its black armor and golden headgear.

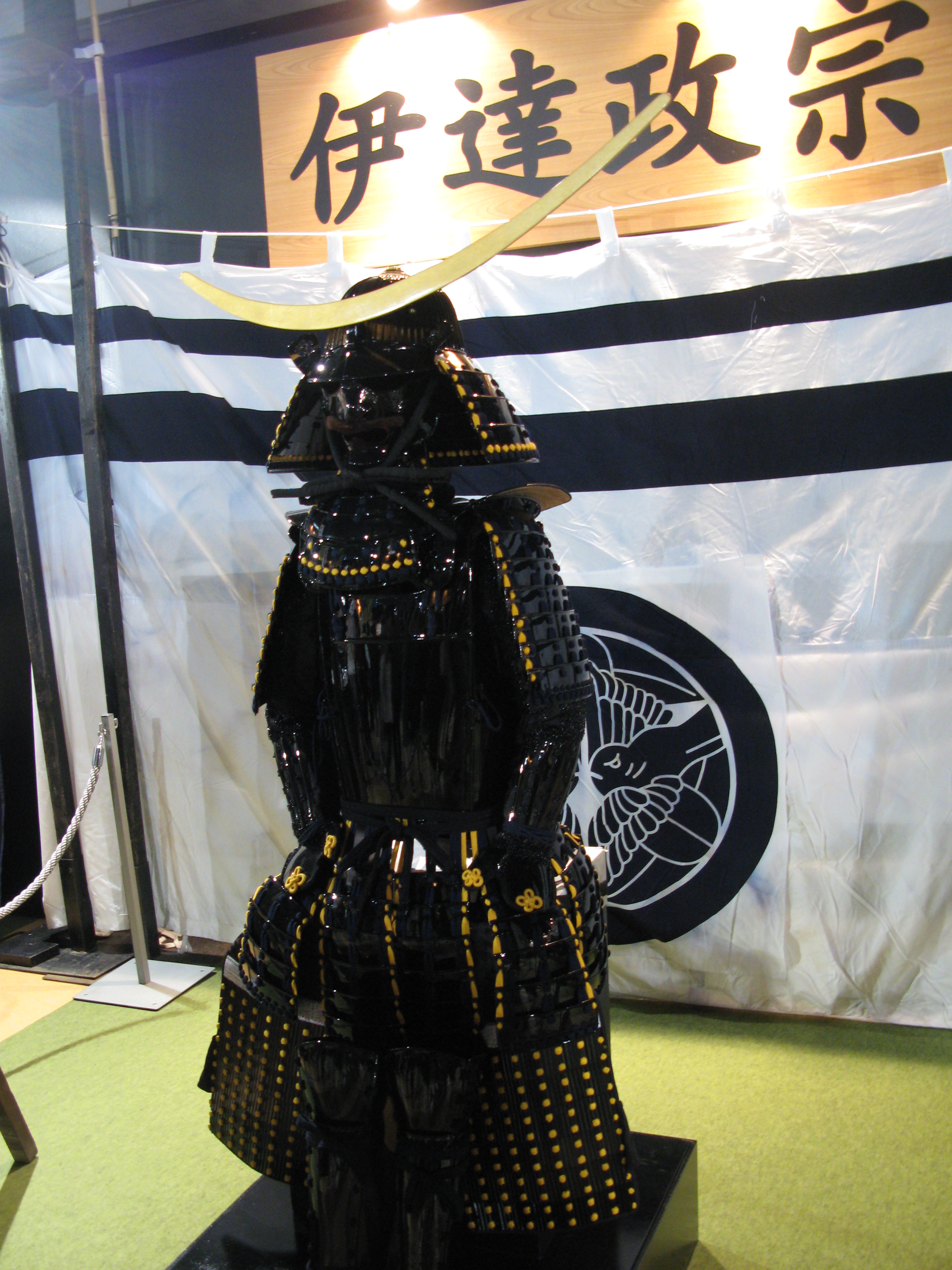
Armor of Date Masamune

Masamune is known for a few things that made him stand out from other daimyō of the time. In particular, his famous crescent-moon-bearing helmet won him a fearsome reputation. As a child, smallpox made him blind in his right eye, though it is unclear exactly how he lost the organ entirely. Various theories behind the eye's condition exist. Some sources say he plucked out the eye himself when a senior member of the clan pointed out that an enemy could grab it in a fight. Others say that he had his trusted retainer Katakura Kojūrō gouge out the eye for him, making him the "One-Eyed Dragon" of Ōshu.

The Date clan had built alliances with neighboring clans through marriages over previous generations, but local disputes remained commonplace. Shortly after Masamune's succession in 1584, a Date retainer named Ōuchi Sadatsuna defected to the Ashina clan of the Aizu region. Masamune declared war on Ōuchi and the Ashina for this betrayal, and started a campaign to hunt down Sadatsuna. Formerly amicable alliances were cast aside as he began to attack and conquer the lands of Sadatsuna's allies in pursuit, even those of his kin in Mutsu and Dewa Province.

In the winter of 1585, one of these allies, Nihonmatsu Yoshitsugu felt defeat was approaching and chose to surrender to the Date instead. Masamune agreed to accept the surrender, but on the heavy condition that the Nihonmatsu give up most of their territory to the Date. This resulted in Yoshitsugu kidnapping Masamune's father Terumune during their meeting in Miyamori Castle, where Terumune was staying during the time. The incident ended with Terumune and Yoshitsugu killed as the fleeing Nihonmatsu party clashed with the pursuing Date troops near the Abukuma River.

Due to the death of Date Terumune by the hands of Nihonmatsu Yoshitsugu, Masamune swore vengeance. In January 1586, Masamune had his revenge by launching an attack against the Nihonmatsu at the Battle of Hitotoribashi. The following year, Date Masamune once again attacked Nihonmatsu at Battle of Koriyama in 1588, the son of Hatakeyama Yoshitsugu set the castle on fire and fled to Aizu. Various records of the event exist, although they present different accounts of its circumstances. That same year, he effectively won a series of battles against the Soma and Ashina clans.

In 1589, the Date clan fought many battles with their neighbours afterwards, including the Siege of Kurokawa and Battle of Suriagehara against Ashina clan. After defeating the Ashina clan, Masamune made Kurokawa Castle in Aizu domain his base of operations. Later, Masamune fought in the Siege of Sukagawa and defeated Nikaidō clan. In the end 1589, Masamune sealed the Date clan's hegemony over southern Mutsu Province.

The emblem (mon) of the Date clan

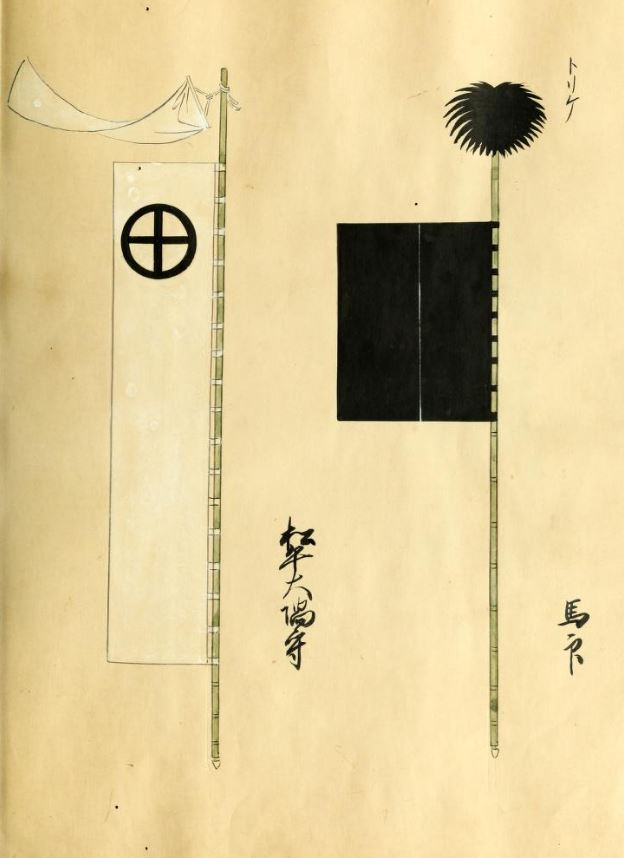
Date Masamune uma-jirushi (right)

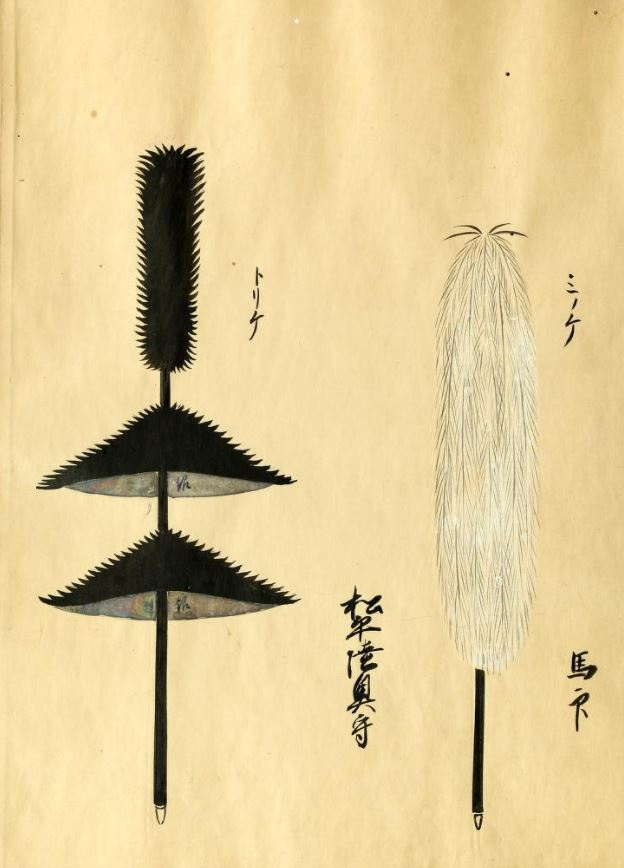
Date Masamune (1567–1636) uma-jirushi (left)

== Service under Hideyoshi ==
In 1590, Toyotomi Hideyoshi seized Odawara Castle and compelled the Tōhoku-region daimyō to participate in the campaign. Although Masamune refused Hideyoshi's demands at first, he had no real choice in the matter since Hideyoshi was the virtual ruler of Japan. Masamune still delayed, infuriating Hideyoshi. Expecting to be executed, Masamune, wearing his finest clothes and showing no fear, faced his angry overlord. Not wanting further trouble, Hideyoshi spared his life, saying that "He could be of some use."

Being a major power in northern Japan, Masamune was naturally viewed with suspicion, as any potential rival would be viewed. Toyotomi Hideyoshi reduced the size of his land holdings after his tardiness in coming to the Siege of Odawara against Hōjō Ujimasa.

In 1591, Masamune forfeited the ancestral land of the Date Clan (present day Date City, Kawamata, Koori, and Kunimi) to Hideyoshi, causing widespread riots. He never regained the territory.

After he fought against the Kunohe rebellion, he was given Iwatesawa and the surrounding lands as his home domain. Masamune moved there, rebuilt the Iwatesawa Castle, renamed it Iwadeyama, and encouraged the growth of a town at its base. Masamune stayed at Iwadeyama for 13 years and turned the region into a major political and economic center.

He and his men served with distinction in the Imjin War of 1592–1598.

== Service under Ieyasu ==
In 1598, after Hideyoshi's death, Masamune began to support Tokugawa Ieyasu—apparently at the advice of Katakura Kojūrō. Tokugawa Ieyasu increased the size of his lands again, but was constantly suspicious of Masamune and his policies. Although Tokugawa Ieyasu and other Date allies were always suspicious of him, Date Masamune for the most part served the Tokugawa loyally.

In 1600, under Tokugawa eastern army, he fought in Sekigahara Campaign at Siege of Shiroishi and Siege of Hasedo. Later, Tokugawa Ieyasu awarded Masamune the lordship of the huge and profitable Sendai Domain, which made Masamune one of Japan's most powerful daimyō. Tokugawa had promised Masamune a one-million koku domain, but, even after substantial improvements were made, the land only produced 640,000 koku, most of which was used to feed the Edo region.

In 1604, Masamune, accompanied by 52,000 vassals and their families, moved to what was then the small fishing village of Sendai. He left his fourth son, Date Muneyasu, to rule Iwadeyama. Masamune would turn Sendai into a large and prosperous city.

In 1614 and 1615, he fought in the Osaka campaigns against the Toyotomi Clan.

Later in 1616, when Tokugawa Ieyasu was on his deathbed, Masamune visited him and read him a piece of Zen poetry. Masamune was highly respected for his ethics; a still-quoted aphorism is, "Rectitude carried to excess hardens into stiffness; benevolence indulged beyond measure sinks into weakness."

== Later years and death ==
Masamune was viewed with caution by Ieyasu and Hidetada, but gained trust during the reign of Iemitsu. As someone who did not experience the Warring States period, Iemitsu had a fondness for hearing stories from the warlords who lived during that time, such as Masamune and Tachibana Muneshige. In 1636, Masamune died of a combination of esophageal cancer and peritonitis at the age of 68 years. He was returned to Sendai in the same daimyō procession as when he was alive. The shogunate gave approval for his eldest legitimate son, Date Tadamune, to inherit the Date clan territory.

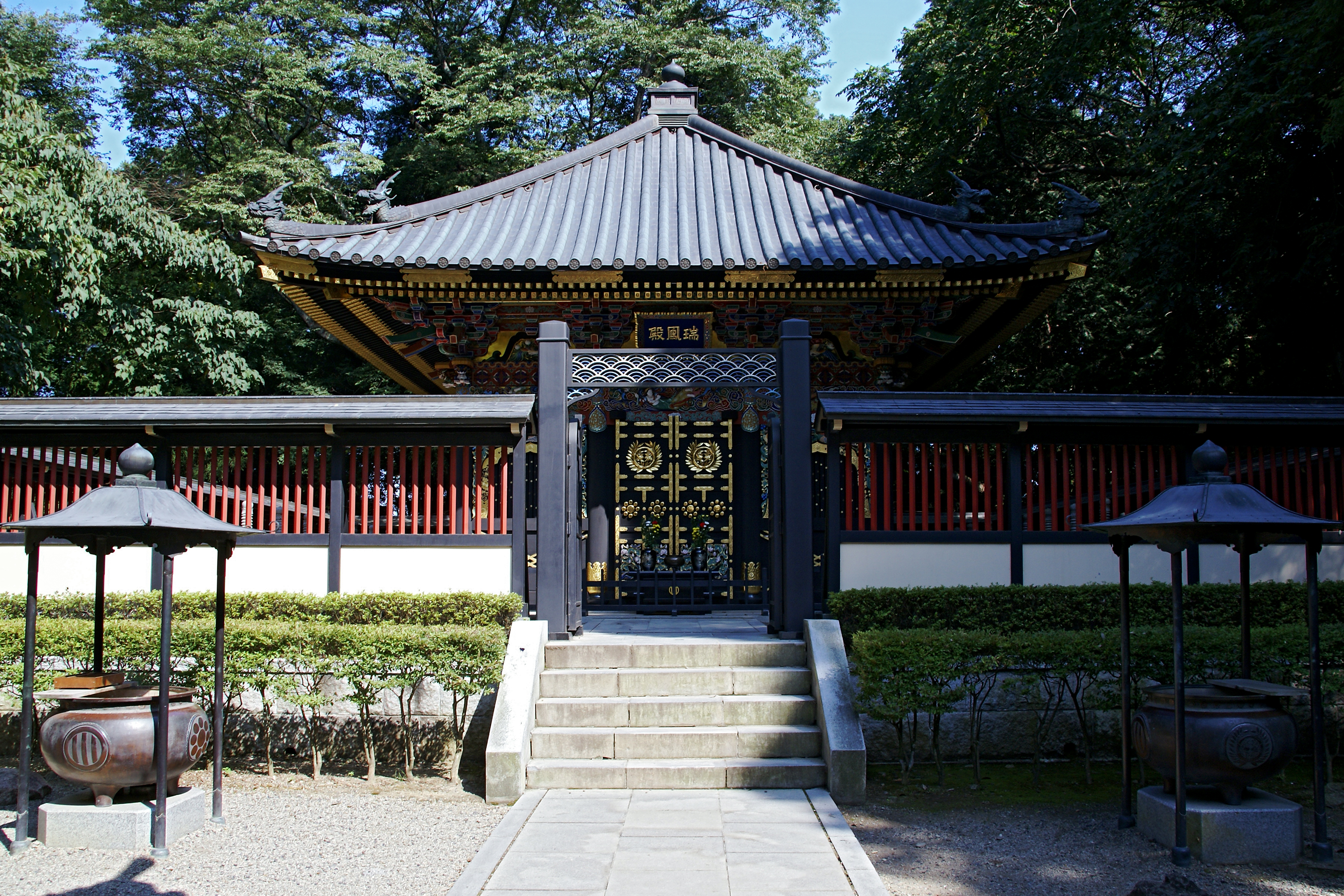
Masamune's Grave at Zuihōden mausoleum

== Patron of culture and Christianity ==
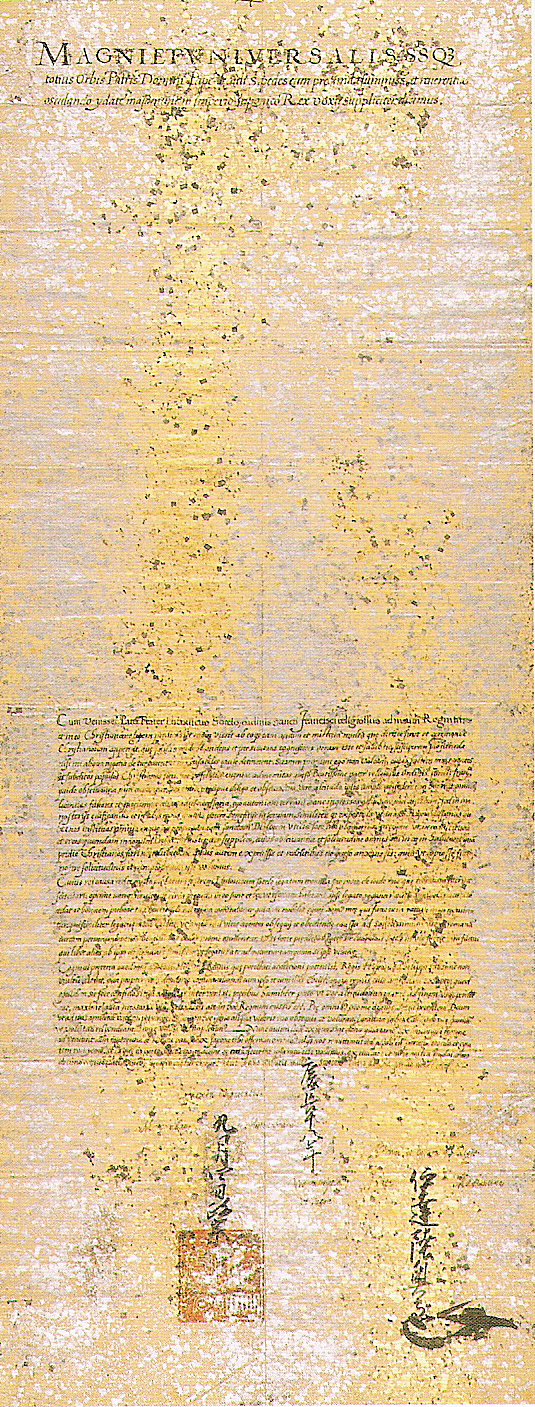
A letter from Masamune to Pope Paul V

Masamune expanded trade in the northeastern Tōhoku region. Although initially faced with attacks by hostile clans, he managed to overcome them after a few defeats and eventually ruled one of the largest fiefdoms of the later Tokugawa shogunate. He built many palaces and worked on many projects to beautify the region. He is also known to have encouraged foreigners to come to his land. Even though he funded and promoted an envoy to establish relations with the Pope in Rome, he was likely motivated at least in part by a desire for foreign technology, similar to that of other lords, such as Oda Nobunaga. Further, once Tokugawa Ieyasu outlawed Christianity, Masamune reversed his position, and though disliking it, let Ieyasu persecute Christians in his domain. For 270 years, Tōhoku remained a place of tourism, trade, and prosperity. Matsushima, for instance, a series of tiny islands, was praised for its beauty and serenity by the wandering haiku poet Matsuo Bashō.

He showed sympathy for Christian missionaries and traders in Japan. In addition to allowing them to come and preach in his province, he also released the prisoner and missionary Padre Sotelo from the hands of Tokugawa Ieyasu. Date Masamune allowed Sotelo as well as other missionaries to practice their religion and win converts in Tōhoku.

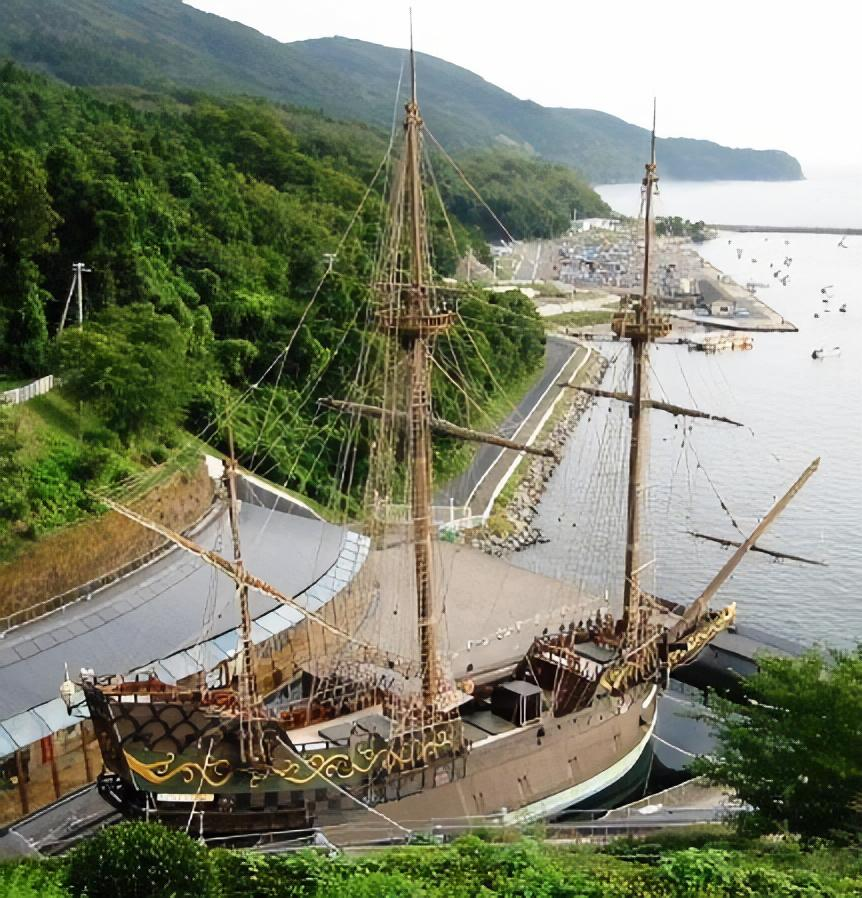
Replica of the galleon Date Maru, or San Juan Bautista, in Ishinomaki, Japan

Masamune notably funded and backed one of Japan's few journeys of far-flung diplomacy and exploration in this period. He ordered the building of the exploration ship San Juan Bautista, using foreign (European) ship-building techniques. He sent one of his retainers, Hasekura Tsunenaga, Sotelo, and an embassy numbering 180 on a successful voyage to establish relations with the Pope in Rome. This expedition visited such places as the Philippines, Mexico, Spain and Rome. Previously, Japanese lords had never funded this sort of venture, so it was probably the first successful voyage. At least five members of the expedition stayed in Coria (Seville) of Spain to avoid the persecution of Christians in Japan. 600 of their descendants, with the surname Japón (Japan), are now living in Spain.

When the Tokugawa government banned Christianity, Masamune had to obey the law. However, some sources suggest that Masamune's eldest daughter, Irohahime, was a Christian.

== Family ==
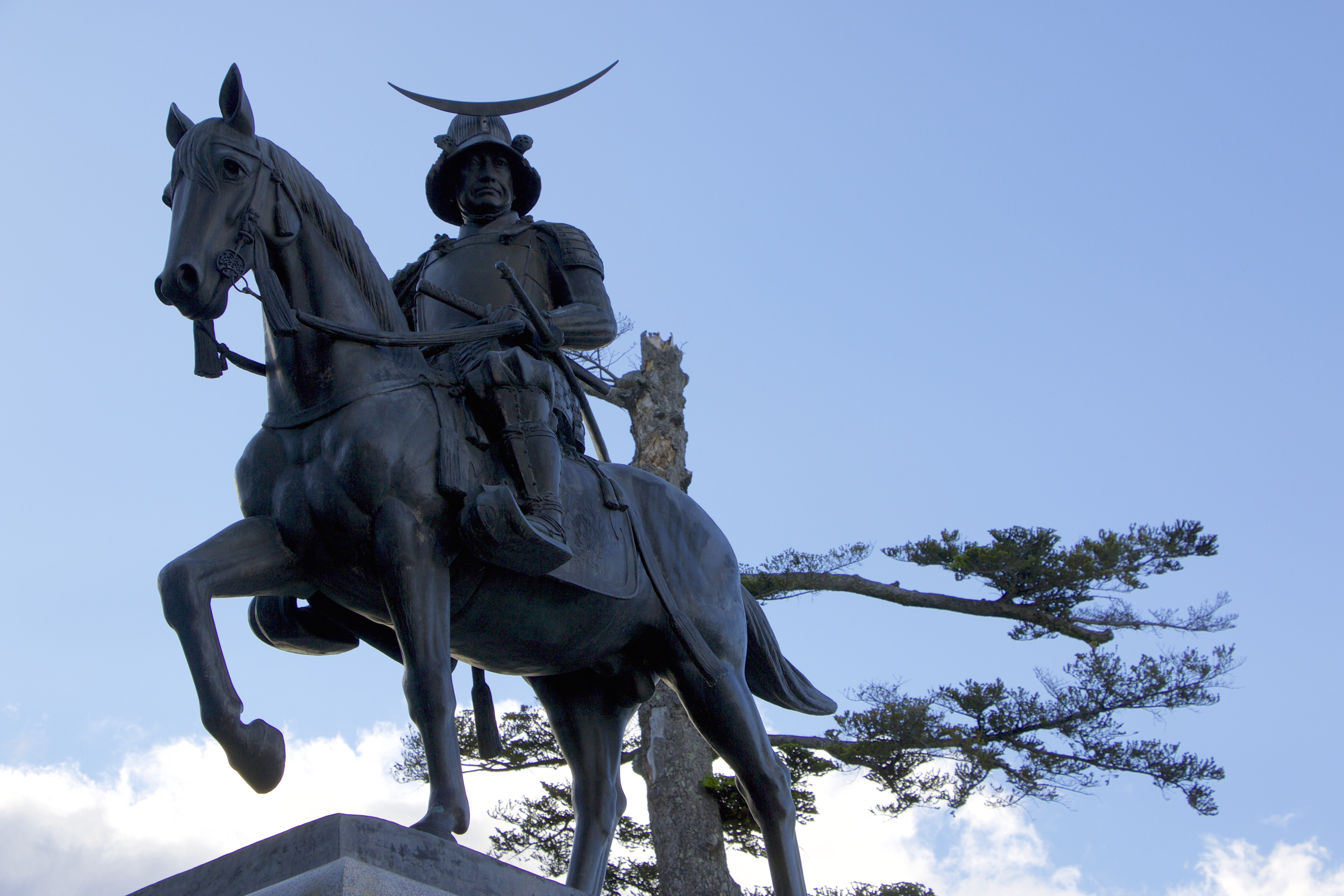
Statue of Date Masamune in Aobayama Park, Sendai

- Father: Date Terumune
- Mother: Yoshihime (1548–1623), daughter of Mogami Yoshimori the daimyō of Dewa Province
- Wife: Megohime, daughter of Tamura Kiyoaki owner of Miharu Castle in Miharu Domain, Mutsu Province
- Sibling: Date Kojirō Masamichi
- Concubines:
  - Īsaka no Tsubone (1569–1634)
  - Shinzō no Kata (d. 1612)
  - Shōkō'in (1583–1656)
  - Oyama no Kata (1587–1668)
  - Shōgo'in (d. 1644)
  - Okachi no Kata (d. 1669)
  - Hosshō'in (1604–1664)
- Prostitute: Kōnomae (1577–1641)
- Children:
  - Date Hidemune (1591–1658), by Shinzō no Kata
  - Irohahime (1594–1661), by Megohime, never remarried after the forced divorce with Matsudaira Tadateru
  - Date Tadamune (1600–1658), by Megohime, the second lord of Sendai Domain
  - Date Munekiyo (1600–1634), by Shinzō no Kata, adopted by Iizaka Muneyasu to succeed the Iizaka clan but died childless
  - Date Muneyasu (1602–1639), by Shōkō'in, first head of the Iwadeyama-Date branch family
  - Date Munetsuna (1603–1618), by Megohime, first head of the Iwagasaki Date branch family but died childless
  - Date Munenobu (1603–1627), by Oyama no Kata, was adopted to become the second head of the Iwagasaki Date branch family but also died childless and it became extinct
  - Date Munetaka (1607–1626), by Oyama no Kata, was adopted and became the first head of the Murata Tade family (a Date line offshoot), but caught smallpox and died childless
  - Mūhime (1608–1683), by Oyama no Kata, married Ishikawa Munetaka
  - Takematsumaru (1609–1615), by Megohime
  - Date Munezane (1613–1665), by Shōgo'in, adopted into the Watari family (different from the Watari-Date family)
  - Minehime (1616–1635), by Okachi no Kata, married Date Munezane (1611–1639) of the Watari-Date family
  - Date Munekatsu (1621–1679), by Okachi no Kata
  - Sengikuhime (1626–1655), by Hosso'in, married Kyōgoku Takakuni
  - Tsuta (1598–1671), by Kōnomae, adopted by Oniniwa Tsunamoto, married Harada Munesuke
  - Watari Munemoto (1600–1669), by Kōnomae, initially adopted by Oniniwa Tsunamoto, then adopted by Watari Shigemune

=== Others ===
- Aunt: Onamihime (1541–1602), daughter of Date Harumune, sister of Date Terumune, and owner of Sukagawa Castle in Mutsu.
- Wet nurse (foster mother): Katakura Kita (1538–1610), half-sister of Katakura Kagetsuna and Oniniwa Tsunamoto, also mentor of Kagetsuna and Masamune.

== "Three Great Men" of Date clan ==
- Katakura Kagetsuna (片倉 景綱, 1557 – December 4, 1615) was a samurai of the Katakura clan, also known by his court title, Bichū no Kami (備中守), or more commonly, as Katakura Kojūrō.
- Date Shigezane (伊達 成実, 1568 – July 17, 1646). A senior retainer of the Date clan of Sendai, he was a cousin of Date Masamune and founder of the Watari-Date clan.
- Oniniwa Tsunamoto (鬼庭 綱元) (1549 – July 13, 1640). Deeply trusted by Masamune, he was made a senior retainer at the young age of 35.

== Retainers ==
- Oniniwa Yoshinao
- Rusu Masakage
- Shiroishi Munezane
- Kokubu Morishige
- Yashiro Kageyori
- Tamura Kiyoaki
- Ōuchi Sadatsuna
- Hasekura Tsunenaga
- Katakura Shigenaga
- Inawashiro Morikuni

== Date clan's prominent castles ==
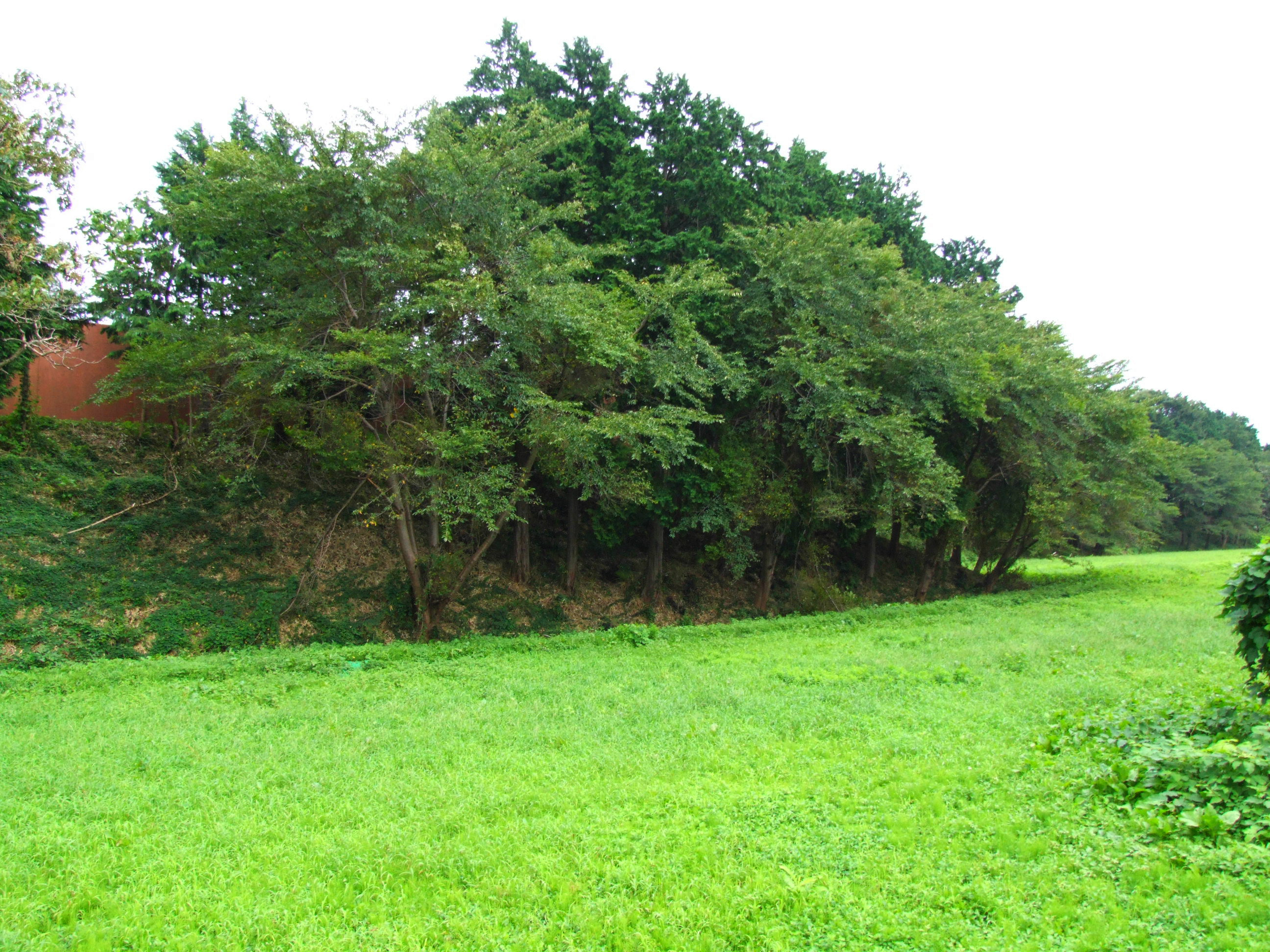
Dry moat and earthen wall of Wakabayashi Castle

- Yonezawa Castle: original base of power for the Date clan from 1548 and possibly Masamune's birthplace.
- Tateyama Castle: Date Terumune spent retired life in the castle. There is a possibility Date Masamune was born in Tateyama castle.
- Obama Castle: Masamune stayed in the castle from 1585 to 1586.
- Kurokawa Castle: original base of power for the Date clan from 1589 to 1591.
- Iwadeyama Castle: original base of power for the Date clan from 1591 to 1601.
- Aoba Castle: original base of power for the Date clan from 1601.
- Wakabayashi Castle: Masamune's fortified residence but now Miyagi prison is on site, He spent most of his time in the castle after he reconstructed it in 1627.
- Nihonmatsu Castle: Katakura Kagetsuna, Date Shigezane
- Hachōme Castle: Date Sanemoto
- Matsumori Castle: Kokubu Morishige
- Fukushima Castle: Date Harumune
- Ōmori Castle: Date Sanemoto, Date Shigezane
- Shiroishi Castle: Katakura Kagetsuna
- Iwakiri Castle: Rusu Masakage
- Watari Castle: Watari Motomune, Katakura Kagetsuna

== In popular culture ==
According to 21st-century historian Watanabe, no historical documents have been found from the Sengoku period that refer to Masamune as the "One-Eyed Dragon." The moniker was first found in the 1830, the famous Confucian scholar Rai San'yō wrote a poem about Masamune in his "Eishi Zekku" (Eishi Quaal Poems), in which he referred to him as the "One-Eyed Dragon". Originally, "One-Eyed Dragon" was the nickname of Li Keyong, who was active in the late Tang dynasty in China. Li Keyong was known as an excellent military commander, and Daimon suspected that San'yō most likely compared Masamune to Li Keyong in that poem.

There is no record of Masamune ever wearing an eyepatch. A portrait of Date Masamune (by Yasunobu Kano) held by the Sendai City Museum is depicted with both eyes open, in accordance with Masamune's will. Portraits and wooden statues made after his death show both eyes open, with the right eye slightly smaller. Daimon also discusses how Masanune's eyepatch appearance fluctuated in 20th-century entertainment. The 1942 film "Dokuganryu Masamune" marked the first time Masamune appeared wearing an eyepatch. Actor Ken Watanabe, who played the lead role of Masamune in the 1987 NHK historical drama "Dokuganryu Masamune," appeared wearing an eyepatch made from the tsuba of a sword over his right eye. Since then, this appearance has become established for portrayals of Masamune.

Masamune is the protagonist of the anime series Masamune Datenicle, produced by the city of Date in collaboration with Fukushima Gainax in order to promote the city's historic connection to the Date Clan. In this series, he is depicted as a child taking on the role of leader of his clan for the first time. Previous leaders of the Date Clan manifest in order to help him prepare for his first battle.

The professional wrestling organization Osaka Pro Wrestling featured two wrestlers using the ring names Masamune and Hideyoshi, who together form the tag team "Sengoku".

== Works cited ==
- 泉田邦彦; 今泉徹; 坂本正仁; 柴裕之; 関周一; 高橋修; 中根正人; 森木悠介 (26 March 2021). 佐々木倫郎; 千葉篤志 (eds.). 戦国佐竹氏研究の最前線 (in Japanese). Tōkyō: Yamakawa Shuppansha. ISBN 978-4-634-15181-9. NCID BC06499277, NAID 110007707970, JPNO 23512961, NDLBibID:031345101.

| Preceded by none | Daimyō of Sendai; 1600–1636 | Succeeded by Date Tadamune |
