= Onamihime =

16th-century Japanese female warrior

Onamihime 阿南姫

Castellan of Sukagawa castle (De facto Nikaidō clan head)
- In office 1582–1589
- Preceded by: Nikaidō Yukichika

Personal details
- Born: July 4, 1541
- Died: August 30, 1602 (aged 61)
- Spouse: Nikaidō Moriyoshi
- Children: Nikaidō Heishiro; Nikaidō Yukichika
- Parents: Date Harumune (father); Kubohime (mother)
- Relatives: Date Terumune (brother); Date Masamune (nephew)

Military service
- Allegiance: Date clan Ashina clan Satake clan
- Unit: Nikaidō clan
- Battles/wars: Battle of Hitotoribashi; Battle of Koriyama; Battle of Suriagehara; Siege of Sukagawa

Onamihime (阿南姫, July 4, 1541 – August 30, 1602) was a late-Sengoku period Onna-musha. She was the first daughter of Date Harumune, sister of Date Terumune and aunt of Date Masamune. She was the ruler of Sukagawa castle in Mutsu Province. She was best known for being a potential enemy of her nephew, Masamune, participating in several campaigns against expansion of the Date clan in the region of Ōshū.

== Biography ==
Onamihime was married off to Nikaidō Moriyoshi and they had two sons, Heishiro and Yukichika. Heishiro was sent off as a hostage with the powerful Ashina clan and was adopted turning as Ashina Moritaka. After Moriyoshi and Yukichika death, Onamihime became the owner of the Sukagawa castle, chief representative of the Nikaido clan and took nun name of Daijou-in.

Due to the death of Date Masamune's father, Date Terumune by the hands of Nihonmatsu Yoshitsugu, Masamune swore vengeance, launching an attack against the Nihonmatsu in 1585. She fought in the Battle of Hitotoribashi alongside Ashina, Sōma, Hatakeyama and Satake against Date clan. The allies marched with their 30,000 troops toward Motomiya Castle. Masamune with only 7,000 troops prepared a defensive strategy, Onamihime commanded her troops to attack but Masamune used a strategic defense and the allied forces retreated. In 1588, Onamihime allied again with Ashina and Sōma clan to counter Date Masamune in Battle of Koriyama.

The Battle of Suriagehara started in July 1589, Date Masamune defeated the Ashina and Satake troops and was given the victory of the Date army, consolidating power in Southern Mutsu. After this Date Masamune asked his aunt to surrender, but she strongly refused. Onamihime and the Ishikawa clan continued with their resistance. She defended herself against the attack at the castle, when her vassal Hodohara Yukifuji betrayed the Nikaidō clan to the Date and helped Masamune take Sukagawa Castle, in October 26, 1589, the castle fell.

Masamune saved his aunt Onamihime's life, and had her escorted safely to live in retirement at Suginome Castle. However, she wasn't going to live with this; Onamihime, who hated Masamune, left to live with Iwaki Tsunetaka, who was another nephew. After his death, she went to Satake Yoshinobu. The Satake clan allied to the Western Army and Onamihime went along in the Battle of Sekigahara. Following the defeat of the Western Army by the Tokugawa Ieyasu Eastern Forces, the Satake Clan was allowed to continue existing, but was punished. The Satake's was moved to Dewa by Tokugawa order in 1602, and it was on the way up to Dewa, while passing her old castle in Sukagawa, that Onamihime died in 1602 and was buried there.

== In popular culture ==
Onamihime appears in Nobunaga's Ambition video games series.

== See also ==
- List of female castellans in Japan
