= Katakura Kita =

Japanese Samurai woman

Katakura Kita 片倉喜多
- Born: 1538
- Died: June 10, 1610
- Known for: Date Masamune's wet nurse and mentor.
- Parents: Oniniwa Yoshinao (father); Lady Naoko (mother)
- Relatives: Katakura Kagenaga (stepfather); Katakura Kagetsuna (half-brother)
- Family: Katakura clan Date clan

Katakura Kita (片倉喜多, 1538 - July, 1610) was a Japanese noble lady, aristocrat and retainer of the Date clan during the Sengoku period. She was the daughter of Oniniwa Yoshinao and Lady Naoko. She was the half-sister of Katakura Kagetsuna and Oniniwa Tsunamoto. Katakura Kita had knowledge in several areas, she was strategic and had great fighting skills. She was the wet nurse of Date Masamune and mentor of Kagetsuna and Masamune. Kita is best known for became a valued mentor and political advisor, choosing to dedicate herself to the affairs of Date clan and was actively involved in Masamune's political and strategic decisions.

== Biography ==
Katakura Kita came from the Oniniwa and Katakura clan, who served local lord Date Terumune in Tōhoku region (northern Japan). When Naoko gave birth to her, her father's concubine gave birth to a boy (Oniniwa Tsunamoto). The concubine becomes the official wife of Oniniwa Yoshinao and Naoko was divorced. After that, Naoko took Kita again with Katakura Kagenaga, and in 1557 she gave birth to Kita's half-brother, Katakura Kagetsuna.

Because of the turbulent circumstances of Kita's life, she was very interested in, and had an aptitude for, both martial arts and military skills. She became the teacher of her younger half-brother, Katakura Kagetsuna, who would succeed the leadership of the Katakura clan later. After the birth of Date Masamune, Date Terumune offered to Kita to be the wet nurse and mentor of Masamune. Yoshihime (Masamune's biological mother) did not want to take care of her own son, it is said that she tried to assassinate him for the political interests of her family, the Mogami clan. However, since Kita was single, she was really a caretaker for children, she had a strong influence on personality formation and Masamune's success

Katakura Kita was present in many of the political matters of the clan Katakura and Date clan. She who was the main supporter for Date Masamune succeed the clan's leadership. Yoshihime was against Masamune's succession and gave preference to her other son. This crisis in the Date family ended with Yoshihime's exile and the death of Masamune's brother.

In 1584, Masamune succeeded the leadership of the Date clan. When Toyotomi Hideyoshi ordered all his vassals to send their families to the Kyoto palace as hostages, Kita went with Megohime (Masamune's wife). Hideyoshi was impressed by Kita's intelligence and cunning. He called Kita as "Shonagon" (title that refers to one of the emperor's high councilors).

In 1590s, after Japan was unified under the name of the Toyotomi clan, Kita acted unilaterally on issues that affected the future of the Date family. Hideyoshi had a bad relation to the Date clan since the Siege of Odawara, Hideyoshi asked Masamune to take his concubine for him, but Masamune refused. Kita worried about Hideyoshi's wrath with Masamune, she convinced the concubine and took her to Hideyoshi. One source reports that, when an angry Masamune confronted Kita, she calmly replied:

"I'll gladly die for being so presumptuous as to have done this. Take my head if it will satisfy you."

Date Masamune sent her north to his domain, placing her under exile. Though she wasn't pardoned for several years, Masamune didn't undo Kita's actions. She lived with Katakura Kagetsuna in near Shiroishi Castle. She continued to be active in the policies of the Katakura clan, her expertise in engineering helped reinforce the castle's defenses. Kita have suggested that the Katakura clan use a particularly valuable temple bells that her family possessed as a motif for its battle flag. The black bell flag remained a Katakura banner through 1871, and it remains the Shiroishi City emblem today.

Katakura Kita died in 1610, at age 72, in Shiroishi Castle. After a few decades, Date Tadamune (Masamune's son) summoned a distant relative of Kita to take over the leadership of the Katakura clan.
