= Moniwa Takamoto =

Moniwa Takamoto (茂庭敬元) (1854–1919) was a Japanese samurai of the late Edo period. The direct descendant of Oniniwa Tsunamoto, Takamoto succeeded to family headship at age 5, following the death of his father Masumoto. However, because of Takamoto's young age, family affairs were overseen by his great-uncle Munekage, the 11th Katakura Kojūrō.
