= Battle of Hitotoribashi =

1586 battle in Japan

Coordinates: 37°31′N 140°24′E

- Part of Sengoku period
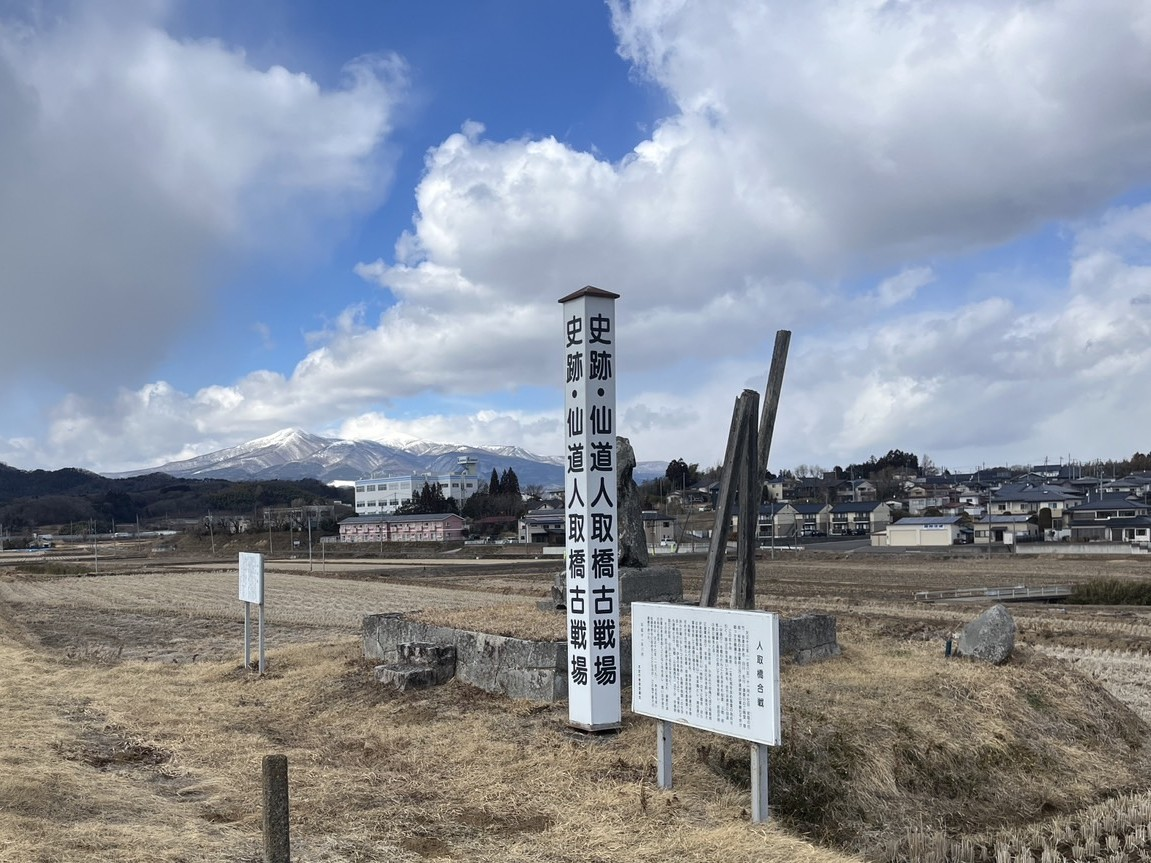
- The site of the battle, 2025
Date	January 6, 1586
Location	Near Hitodori Bridge in Adachi County of Mutsu Province, modern-day Motomiya, Fukushima
Result	Date Masamune retreat; Nihonmatsu and allies withdrew

Belligerents
Date clan Katakura clan	Nihonmatsu clan Sōma clan Satake clan Ashina clan Nikaido clan Iwaki clan

Commanders and leaders
Date Masamune; Date Shigezane; Katakura Kagetsuna; Oniniwa Yoshinao †	Onamihime; Sōma Yoshitane; Satake Yoshishige; Satake Yoshinobu; Iwaki Tsunetaka

Strength
7,000	30,000

Casualties and losses
380	963

The Battle of Hitotoribashi (Japanese: 人取橋の戦い) was a battle during the Azuchi-Momoyama period (16th century) of Japan. Due to the death of Date Masamune's father, Date Terumune by the hands of Nihonmatsu Yoshitsugu, Masamune swore vengeance.

After succeeding to the throne of the Date clan, Masamune would effectively have his revenge by launching an attack against the Nihonmatsu clan and their allies at Hitotoribashi in January 1586. Despite a large imbalance between the forces (Date force: 7,000; Nihonmatsu forces: 30,000), the alliance assembled in support of the Nihonmatsu forces disintegrated and withdrew after beating Masamune back into the Motomiya Castle.

== Background ==
After Terumune was abducted and killed near Abukuma river, a war proceeded between the Date clan and their traditional rivals the Nihonmatsu clan. The Nihonmatsu allied with the Sōma, Satake, Nikaido, and Ashina clans. The allies marched with their 30,000 troops toward Motomiya Castle. Masamune with only 7,000 troops prepared a defensive strategy, including a series of forts that guarded the route to Motomiya Castle.

== Battle ==
At the opening of battle on 6 January, Masamune led his forces from Motomiya Castle, crossed the Adatara River, and encamped at Mount Kannondō. Three of Masamune's forts were taken, and although Masamune tried to force back the Satake allies from the Seto River, he failed. Two Date detachments were left to protect the rearguard and east flank, under chief retainers Oniniwa Yoshinao and Date Shigezane; both slowed the Satake allies long enough for Masamune to escape to Motomiya. Shigezane survived, but Yoshinao was killed in action, Yoshinao troops killed many of Iwaki clan's men but finally was killed by Iwaki Tsunetaka's general, Kubota Jūrō.

The next morning, the Date forces found that the Satake clan had withdrawn and its allies had scattered. In the Satake armies' absence from their home territory in Hitachi Province, Hōjō clan partisans Edo Yoshimichi and Satomi Yoshiyori had attacked; further, in the encampment near Motomiya castle, Satake vassal and senior commander Onozaki Yoshimasa was assassinated. In the midst of this crisis, the clan forces thus withdrew.
