= Ōuchi Sadatsuna =

Japanese samurai

- 大内 定綱
- Born: 1545; Mutsu Province
- Died: 1610 (aged 64–65)
- Military career
- Commands: Obama Castle, Hobara Castle, Maezawa Castle
- Conflicts: Battle of Suriagehara, Korean Campaign

Ōuchi Sadatsuna (大内 定綱; 1545–1610) was a Japanese samurai and military commander of the Sengoku period. He was the lord of the Obama Castle. Sadatsuna belonged under the command of Tamura Kiyoaki. But Sadatsuna switched from the Tamura clan to the Ashina clan and he became independent of the Tamura clan. Later, he served the Date clan and became a senior retainer. He participated in the successful Kōriyama Campaign in 1588.

== Works cited ==
- 泉田邦彦; 今泉徹; 坂本正仁; 柴裕之; 関周一; 高橋修; 中根正人; 森木悠介 (26 March 2021). 佐々木倫郎; 千葉篤志 (eds.). 戦国佐竹氏研究の最前線 (in Japanese). Tōkyō: Yamakawa Shuppansha. ISBN 978-4-634-15181-9. NCID BC06499277, NAID 110007707970, JPNO 23512961, NDLBibID:031345101.
