= Date Shigezane =

- 伊達 成実
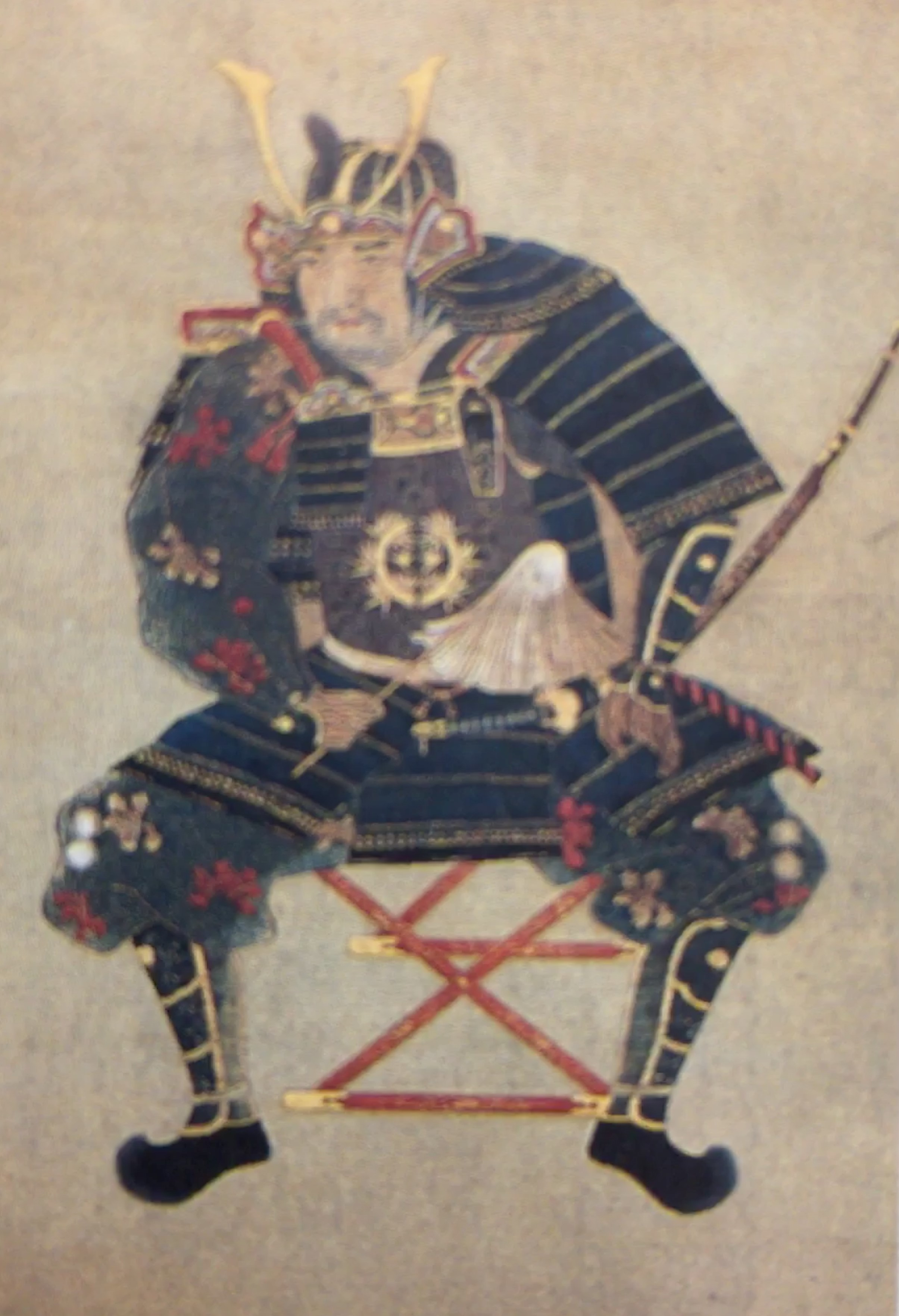
- Born: 1568
- Died: July 17, 1646 (aged 77–78)
- Military career
- Allegiance: Date clan
- Nickname: Tôgorô
- Unit: Watari-Date clan
- Commands: Nihonmatsu Castle
- Conflicts: Battle of Hitotoribashi; Battle of Kōriyama; Battle of Suriagehara; Siege of Sukagawa; Kunohe Rebellion; Korean Campaign; Sekigahara Campaign; Battle of Matsukawa; Osaka Campaign

Date Shigezane (伊達 成実; DAH-tay; 1568 – July 17, 1646) was a Japanese samurai of the late Sengoku through early Edo periods. Founder of the Watari-Date clan. A senior retainer of the Date clan of Sendai, he was a cousin of Date Masamune on his mother's side, and a cousin of Masamune's father Date Terumune on his father's side. Together with Oniniwa Tsunamoto and Katakura Kagetsuna, Shigezane was known as one of the "Three Great Men of the Date Clan".

Shigezane was a son of Date Sanemoto and was at first known as Tôgorô. He fought at the Battle of Hitotoribashi in 1586, participated in the Kōriyama Campaign in 1588, fought in the 1589 Battle of Suriagehara, and well known for his fighting skill.

In 1589, after distinguishing himself at the Battle of Suriagehara, he was given Nihonmatsu Castle and an income of 38,000 koku. He played an active role in the defeat of the Ashina clan.

In 1595, after the first Korean campaign, he suddenly retired at Mount Koya, but re-entered Masamune's service in 1600 at Sekigahara campaign and later went on to fight at Osaka Campaign in 1614 - 1615. He later produced a written work on the Date family.

== Works cited ==
- 泉田邦彦; 今泉徹; 坂本正仁; 柴裕之; 関周一; 高橋修; 中根正人; 森木悠介 (26 March 2021). 佐々木倫郎; 千葉篤志 (eds.). 戦国佐竹氏研究の最前線 (in Japanese). Tōkyō: Yamakawa Shuppansha. ISBN 978-4-634-15181-9. NCID BC06499277, NAID 110007707970, JPNO 23512961, NDLBibID:031345101.
