= Date Terumune =

Daimyo of the Date clan of Mutsu Province

- 伊達 輝宗
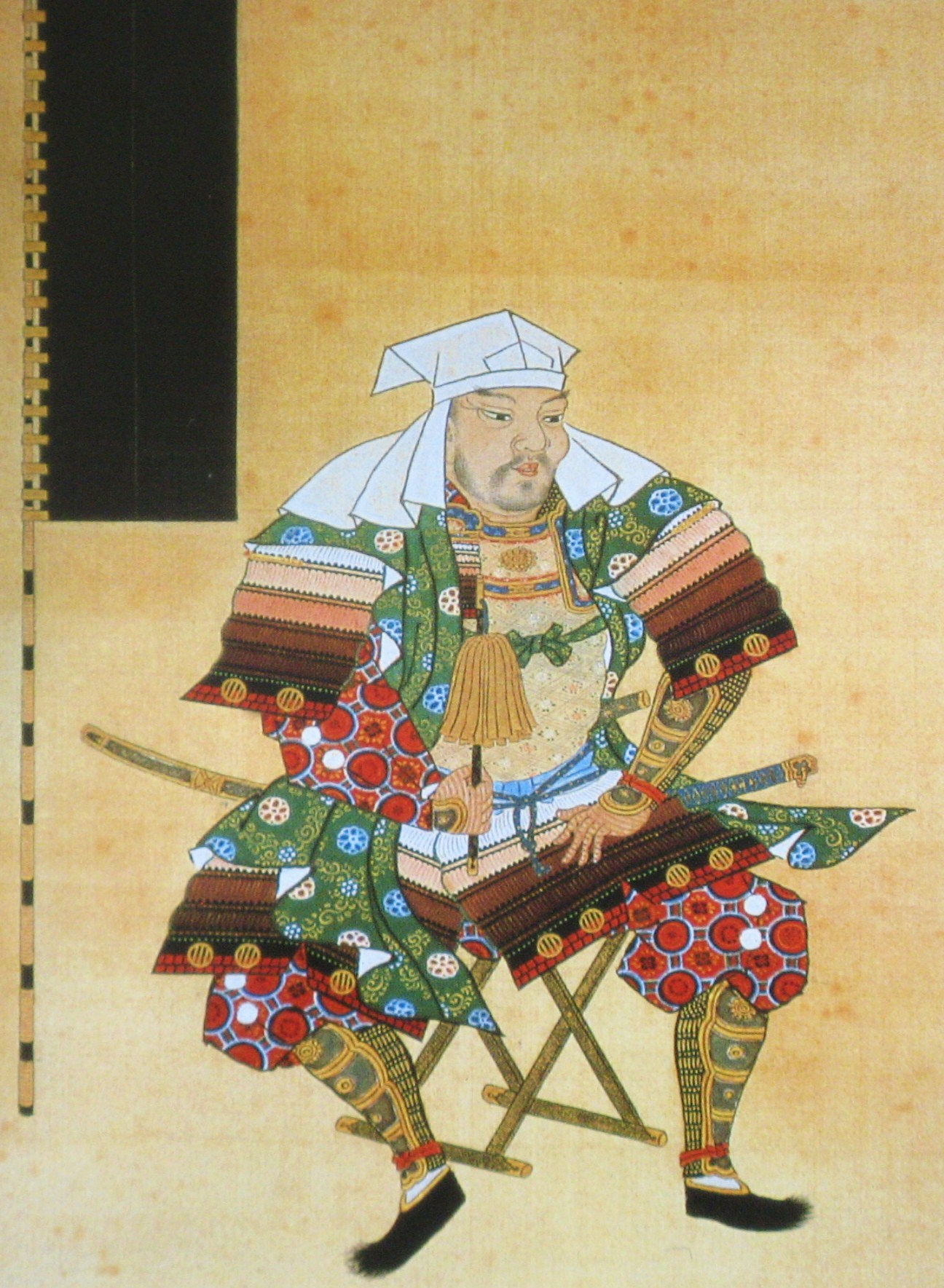

Head of Date clan
- In office 1578–1584
- Preceded by: Date Harumune
- Succeeded by: Date Masamune

Personal details
- Born: 1544
- Died: November 29, 1585 (aged 40–41)
- Resting place: Yonezawa, Yamagata
- Spouse: Yoshihime
- Children: Date Masamune; Date Masamichi; Date Hideo; Chiko-hime
- Parents: Date Harumune (father); Kubohime (mother)
- Relatives: Onamihime (sister); Rusu Masakage (brother); Ishikawa Akimitsu (brother); Kokubu Morishige (brother); Mogami Yoshiaki (brother-in-law)

Military service
- Allegiance: Date clan Oda clan
- Rank: Daimyo
- Commands: Yonezawa Castle
- Battles/wars: Siege of Nihonmatsu (1568)

Date Terumune (伊達 輝宗; DAH-tay; 1544 – November 29, 1585) was a Japanese samurai clan leader of the Sengoku period. He had close relationship with Oda Nobunaga, one of the leading figures of the period. Terumune was the father of Date Masamune, who succeeded him as clan leader in 1584.

== Biography ==
Terumune's childhood name was Hikotaro (彦太郎) later Sojiro (総次郎). He was born a warrior since his family is often in conflict with its neighbors.

In 1568, Terumune attacked Nihonmatsu Castle against Nihonmatsu Yoshitsugu, outnumbered and defeated, Yoshitsugu pretended to surrender.

Terumune fought against the Mogami Yoshiaki twice in different years, 1574 and 1578, in both battles, his wife, who also Yoshiaki sister, Yoshihime, advanced to the middle of the battlefield to create a peace treaty.

Later in 1578, Terumune succeeded his father Harumune; and he became the sixteenth head of the Date clan of Mutsu Province.

Records show that Nobunaga cultivated a close relationship with Terumune. The daimyo often confided in him affairs of the state through letters. During his campaigns unifying Japan, he sent Terumune a letter boasting how he annihilated tens of thousands in Echizen and Kaga.

When Oda Nobunaga was assassinated in 1582, Terumune gave his clan's support to Toyotomi Hideyoshi in the power struggle which followed.

An account cited him as party to the negotiation with a local rival called Hatakeyama Yoshitsugu. At this time, his son Date Masamune appear to be leading the clan. In 1585, Yoshitsugu was invited to a feast after an alliance was forged. A day after, when Masamune took the guest hunting, the latter's men abducted the undefended Terumune. Yoshitsugu stabbed Terumune to his death when he panicked as Masamune and his men caught up with him by the banks of the Abukuma River. A version of this account stated that Terumune was taken to the kidnapper's fort, where he was slain during Terumune's siege.

== Family ==
The emblem (mon) of the Date clan

- Father: Date Harumune
- Mother: Kubohime (1521–1594)
- Wife: Yoshihime (1548–1623)
- Sister: Onamihime
- Children:
  - Date Masamune by Yoshihime
  - Date Masamichi (1568–1590) by Yoshihime
  - Chikohime by Yoshihime
  - Senshihime by Yoshihime

== Retainers ==
- Oniniwa Yoshinao
- Date Sanemoto
- Endō Motonobu
- Shiroishi Munezane

== In fiction ==
In NHK's 1987 Taiga drama Dokuganryū Masamune, Terumune was played by Kin'ya Kitaōji.
