= Rusu Masakage =

Japanese samurai

- 留守 政景
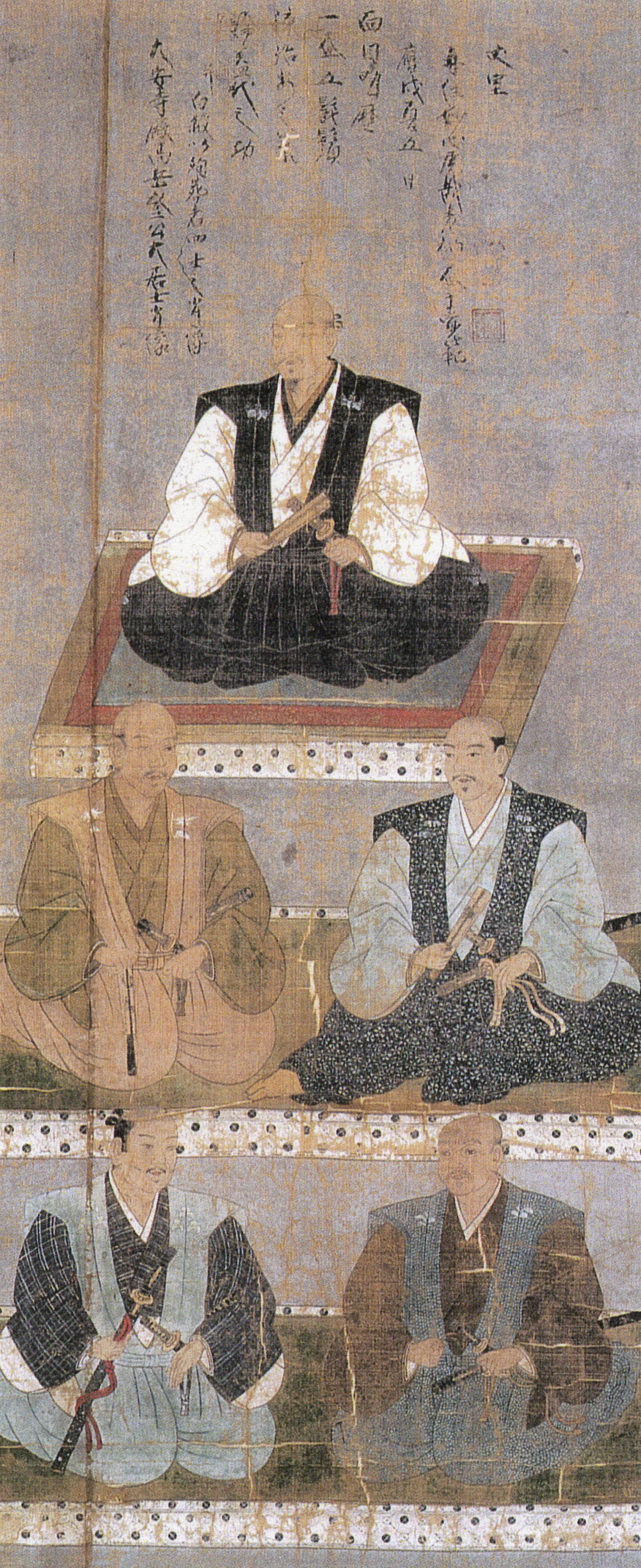
- Rusu Masakage (top)
- Born: 1549
- Died: February 28, 1607 (aged 57–58)
- Military career
- Allegiance: Date clan
- Nickname: Rokurō
- Unit: Rusu clan
- Conflicts: Kasai-Osaki Uprising; Siege of Hasedō

Rusu Masakage (留守 政景; 1549 – February 28, 1607) was a Japanese samurai of the Sengoku period through Azuchi-Momoyama period. Served as a retainer of the Date clan Masakage was the uncle of the famous Date Masamune.

Masakage, or as he was first known, Rokurō, was the son of Date Harumune. He was later adopted by Rusu Akimune, head of the Rusu clan which governed Miyagi district. In 1568, he married the daughter of Kurokawa "Sama-no-Kami" Haruuji, lord of the Kurokawa district (later known as Aizu).

Masakage contributed very highly to the Date clan by defending it from many oppositions. He was participate at the Siege of Hasedō in 1600, also involved in the succession dispute. Masakage was extremely close to Masamune, as one of his top subordinates, bringing him to many victories. The greatest victory he brought to Masamune was in the "Kasai-Osaki Uprising" or Ōshū campaign along with Yashiro Kageyori.

== In fiction ==
In NHK's 1987 Taiga drama Dokuganryū Masamune, Masakage was played by Kyōzō Nagatsuka.
