= Date Sanemoto =

Japanese samurai

- 伊達 実元
- Born: 1527
- Died: 1587 (aged 59–60); Hachōme Castle
- Military career
- Commands: Ōmori Castle, Hatchōme Castle

Date Sanemoto (伊達 実元; DAH-tay; 1527 – 1587) was a Japanese samurai and commander during the Sengoku period. He was the third son of Date Tanemune. His son, Date Shigezane, was also an important vassal of the Date clan.

Date Tanemune tried to adopt him into the Uesugi clan and had already agreed with the Uesugi clan on the plan. However, some of his vassals opposed this decision, leading to the Tenbun Conflict. As a result, the adoption plan failed.

In 1583, Sanemoto relinquished the family head position to Date Shigezane and retired to Hatchōme Castle.
