= Tamura Kiyoaki =

Japanese samurai (d. 1586)

- 田村 清顕
- Born: Unknown; Mutsu Province
- Died: 1586
- Relatives: Date Masamune (son-in-law), Lady Tamura (daughter)
- Military career
- Rank: Daimyo
- Commands: Miharu Castle
- Conflicts: Battle of Miyoda

Tamura Kiyoaki (田村 清顕; ? – 1586) was a Japanese samurai and head of the Tamura clan. Tamura clan was a daimyō ruled part of Mutsu. Kiyoaki inherited the headship of the Tamura clan around 1571. His daughter Lady Tamura married Date Masamune.
