= Nihonmatsu Yoshitsugu =

Japanese daimyō

Nihonmatsu Yoshitsugu (二本松 義継, 1552–1585)

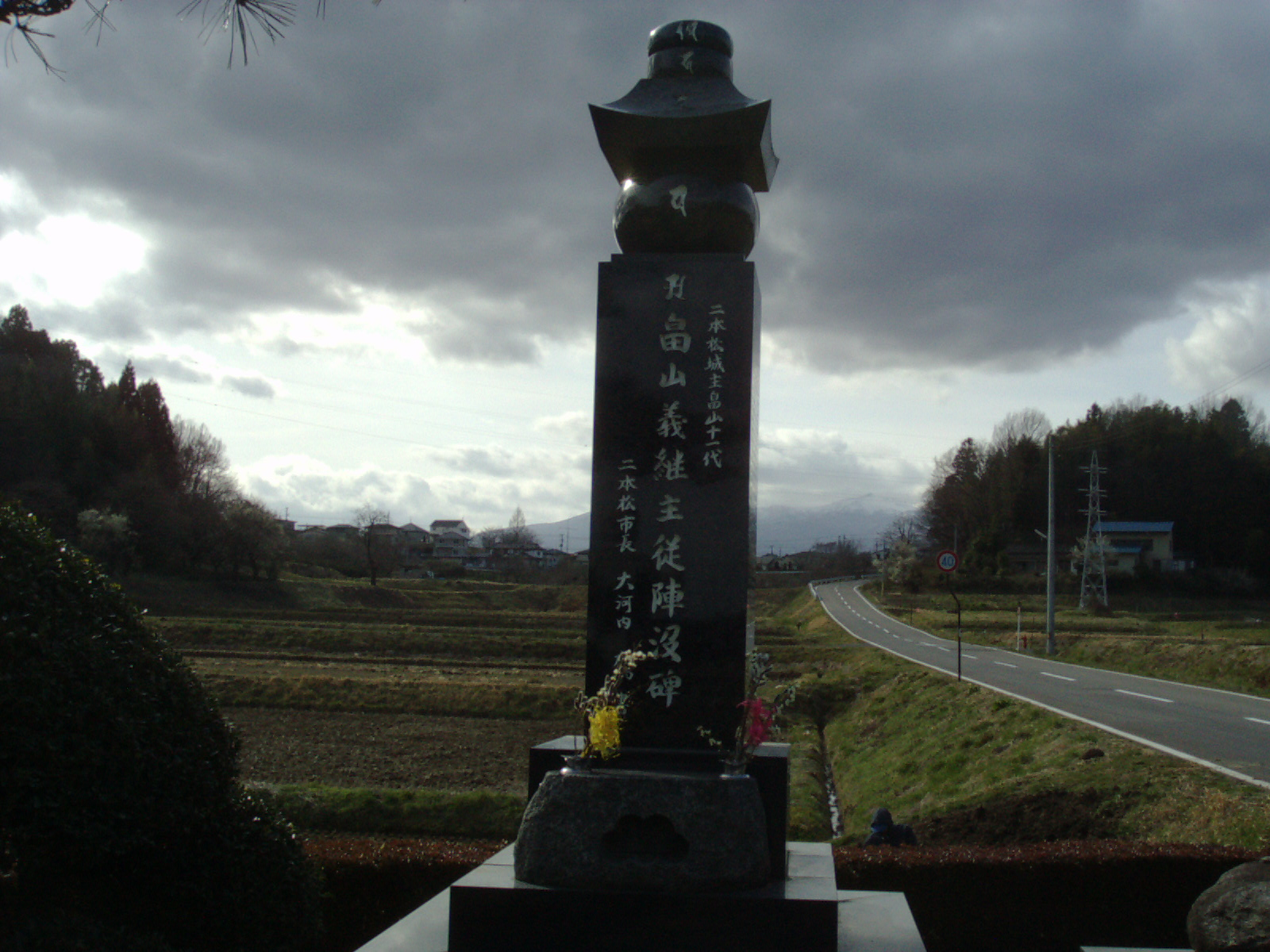
The place where Yoshitsugu Hatakeyama died in battle

or Hatakeyama Yoshitsugu was a Japanese daimyō of the Sengoku period, son of Nihonmatsu Yoshikuni. He was the 14th head of the Nihonmatsu clan (a branch of the Hatakeyama clan) of Mutsu.

In 1568, Yoshitsugu was attacked by Date Terumune, the father of the famous Date Masamune, outnumbered and defeated, he pretended to surrender.

In 1585, instead Yoshitsugu took Terumune as a hostage, Masamune’s forces counterattacked, and in the ensuring battle, both Nihonmatsu Yoshitsugu and Date Terumune were killed.

After the death of Date Terumune at Nihonmatsu's hands, his rival Date Masamune swore revenge, which culminated in the Battle of Hitotoribashi.

In 1588, during the attack of Koriyama castle by Date Masamune, the sons of Hatakeyama Yoshitsugu set the Koriyama castle on fire and fled to Ashina clan at Kurokawa Castle. Yoshitsugu son is Nihonmatsu Yoshitsuna (1574-1589) and Nihonmatsu Yoshitaka (1578-1655)
