= Kokubu (disambiguation) =

Kokubu (国分市, Kokubu-shi) was a city located in Kagoshima Prefecture, Japan.

Kokubu may refer to the following:

== Places ==
- Kokubu Castle (国分城), the remains of a castle structure in Kirishima, Kagoshima Prefecture
- Kokubu Station (Kagawa), a railway station
- Kokubu Station (Kagoshima), a railway station

== People ==
Kokubu (written: 国分 or 國分) is a Japanese surname. Notable people with the surname include:

- Beauty Kokubu (ビューティーこくぶ) (born Hideyuki Kokubu (国分 秀之), 1973), a Japanese impressionist (monomane tarento)
- Kokubu Morishige (国分 盛重) (1553–1615), a Japanese samurai of the Sengoku through early Edo period
- Sachiko Kokubu (国分 佐智子) (born 1976), a Japanese actress and fashion model
- Shintaro Kokubu (國分 伸太郎) (born 1994), a Japanese football player

== See also ==
- Kokubun (国分 or 國分), a Japanese surname
- Kokubunji (disambiguation) (国分寺)
