= Kokubun =

Kokubun (written: 国分 or 國分) is a Japanese surname. The kanji used to write this surname may also be read Kokubu.

Notable people with the surname Kokubun include:

- Russell S. Kokubun (born 1948), American politician
- Ryosei Kokubun (国分 良成) (born 1953), Japanese academic and author
- Shion Kokubun (國分 紫苑) (born 1991), Japanese figure skater
- Taichi Kokubun (国分 太一) (born 1974), Japanese musician and actor
- Yukari Kokubun (國分 優香里) (born 1983), Japanese voice actress

Notable people with the surname Kokubu include:

- Beauty Kokubu (ビューティーこくぶ) (born Hideyuki Kokubu (国分 秀之), 1973), Japanese impressionist (monomane tarento)
- Kokubu Morishige (国分 盛重) (1553–1615), Japanese samurai of the Sengoku through early Edo period
- Sachiko Kokubu (国分 佐智子) (born 1976), Japanese actress and fashion model
- Shintaro Kokubu (國分 伸太郎) (born 1994), Japanese football player

== See also ==
- Kokubu (disambiguation)
- Kokubunji (国分寺) (disambiguation)
