= Meanings of minor-planet names: 87001–88000 =

As minor planet discoveries are confirmed, they are given a permanent number by the IAU's Minor Planet Center (MPC), and the discoverers can then submit names for them, following the IAU's naming conventions. The list below concerns those minor planets in the specified number-range that have received names, and explains the meanings of those names.

Official naming citations of newly named small Solar System bodies are approved and published in a bulletin by IAU's Working Group for Small Bodies Nomenclature (WGSBN). Before May 2021, citations were published in MPC's Minor Planet Circulars for many decades. Recent citations can also be found on the JPL Small-Body Database (SBDB). Until his death in 2016, German astronomer Lutz D. Schmadel compiled these citations into the Dictionary of Minor Planet Names (DMP) and regularly updated the collection.

Based on Paul Herget's The Names of the Minor Planets, Schmadel also researched the unclear origin of numerous asteroids, most of which had been named prior to World War II. This article incorporates text from this source, which is in the public domain: SBDB New namings may only be added to this list below after official publication as the preannouncement of names is condemned. The WGSBN publishes a comprehensive guideline for the naming rules of non-cometary small Solar System bodies.

== 87001–87100 ==
Named minor planet	Provisional	This minor planet was named for...	Ref · Catalog
87088 Joannewheeler	2000 LY	Joanne Wheeler (born 1971) is a Member of the Order of the British Empire for her services to space. She is a leader in the space law discipline, and a fellow of the Royal Astronomical Society and Royal Aeronautical Society. She has drafted U.K. space law, supported the growth of space companies and briefed on asteroid exploration.	JPL · 87088
87097 Lomaki	2000 LJ_{10}	The Lomaki pueblo, one of smaller pueblos surrounding the main Wupatki pueblo (Wupatki National Monument) in northern Arizona. Its ruins preserve clues to geologic history, ecological change and ancient human agricultural settlement. Lomaki pueblo was built on the edge of a canyon in the 1190s (List of Ancestral Puebloan dwellings in Arizona).	JPL · 87097

== 87101–87200 ==
back to top

Named minor planet	Provisional	This minor planet was named for...	Ref · Catalog
87142 Delsanti	2000 NL_{13}	Audrey Delsanti (born 1976) is an associate professor at the University of Aix-Marseille (France) who studies the chemical composition and physical properties of small bodies across the Solar System.	IAU · 87142

== 87201–87300 ==
back to top

Named minor planet	Provisional	This minor planet was named for...	Ref · Catalog
87219 Marcbernstein	2000 OH_{39}	Marc Bernstein (born 1953) provided technical leadership and expertise for 32 years as a member of the MIT Lincoln Laboratory staff. This naming was on the occasion of his retirement as associate director and from the Lincoln Laboratory Steering Committee.	IAU · 87219
87271 Kokubunji	2000 PY_{3}	Kokubunji, a city in Tokyo Metropolis, Japan.	JPL · 87271

== 87301–87400 ==
back to top

Named minor planet	Provisional	This minor planet was named for...	Ref · Catalog
87312 Akirasuzuki	2000 QK_{1}	Akira Suzuki (born 1930) has developed a new research topic that is globally recognized as the Suzuki coupling reaction. It is for this achievement that he was awarded the Nobel Prize in Chemistry in 2010.	JPL · 87312

== 87401–87500 ==
back to top

Named minor planet	Provisional	This minor planet was named for...	Ref · Catalog
There are no named minor planets in this number range

== 87501–87600 ==
back to top

Named minor planet	Provisional	This minor planet was named for...	Ref · Catalog
There are no named minor planets in this number range

== 87601–87700 ==
back to top

Named minor planet	Provisional	This minor planet was named for...	Ref · Catalog
87644 Cathomen	2000 RJ_{77}	Rita Cathomen (born 1940) and her husband Ignaz (born 1934) live in Falera, Switzerland. In 1979, they learned about a possible megalithic menhir formation in Falera. After re-erecting 33 of 34 fallen menhirs, Ignaz provided guided tours during the summer until 2019.	IAU · 87644

== 87701–87800 ==
back to top

Named minor planet	Provisional	This minor planet was named for...	Ref · Catalog
There are no named minor planets in this number range

== 87801–87900 ==
back to top

Named minor planet	Provisional	This minor planet was named for...	Ref · Catalog
There are no named minor planets in this number range

== 87901–88000 ==
back to top

Named minor planet	Provisional	This minor planet was named for...	Ref · Catalog
87933 Bernardschmitt	2000 SL_{346}	Bernard P. Schmitt (born 1959), French planetary scientist specialising in planetary spectroscopy.	JPL · 87933
87954 Tomkaye	2000 TK	Tom Kaye (born 1957) is an American businessman and amateur astronomer. In March 2000, he collaborated with others to detect a previously discovered extrasolar planet Tau Boötis b around the star Tau Boötis using the doppler shift method with a 0.4-m telescope and home-built spectrograph. The name was suggested by Mark Trueblood.	JPL · 87954

back to top

Preceded by 86,001–87,000	Meanings of minor-planet names List of minor planets: 87,001–88,000	Succeeded by 88,001–89,000
