= Date Harumune =

Japanese daimyō of the Sengoku period

- 伊達 晴宗
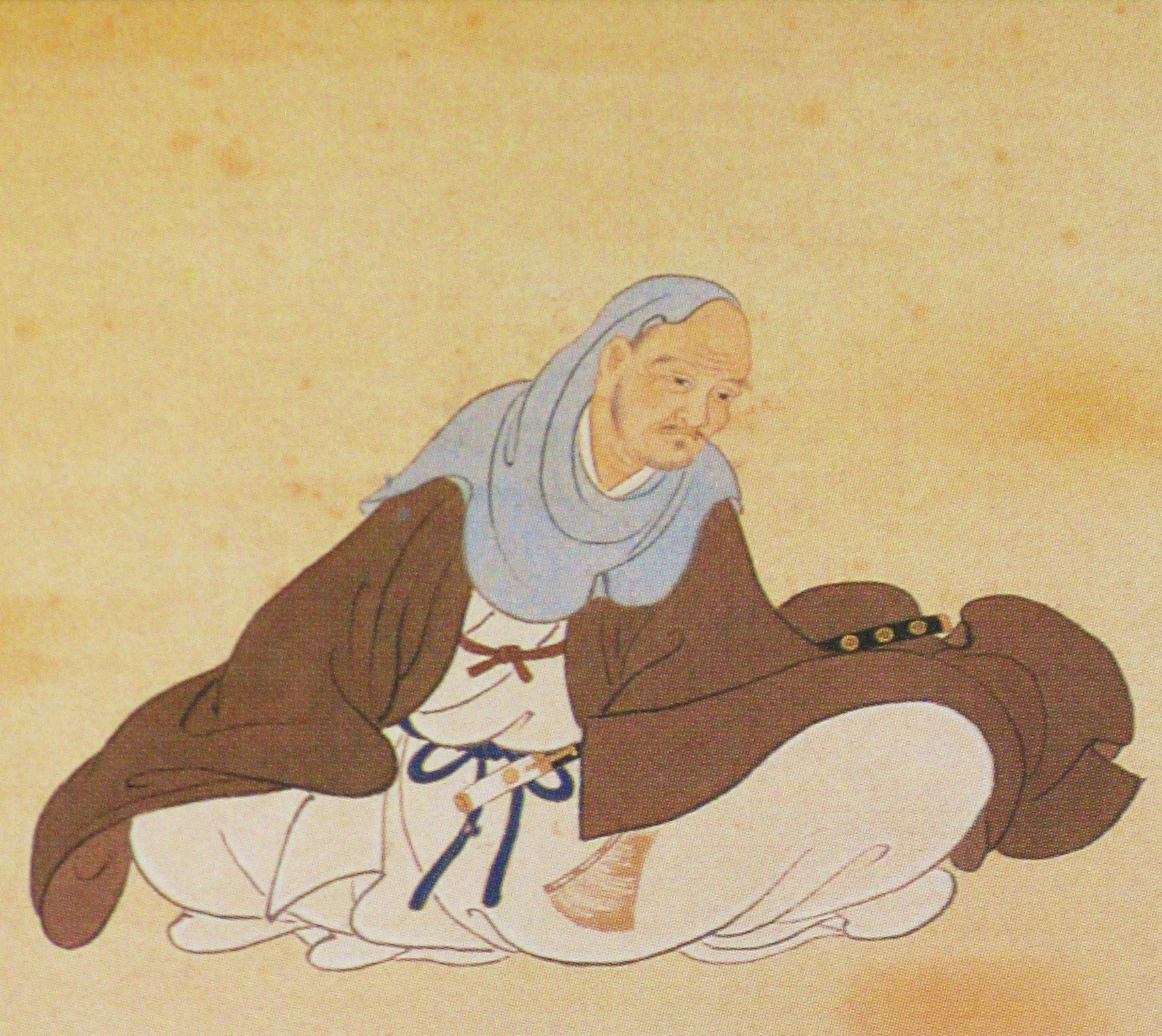

Head of Date clan
- In office 1548–1578
- Preceded by: Date Tanemune
- Succeeded by: Date Terumune

Personal details
- Born: Jiro; 1519
- Died: January 12, 1578 (aged 58–59)
- Spouse: Kubohime
- Relations: Date Masamune (grandson)
- Children: Onamihime; Date Terumune; Rusu Masakage; Ishikawa Akimitsu; Kokubu Morishige
- Parents: Date Tanemune (father); Teishin'in (mother)

Military service
- Allegiance: Date clan
- Rank: Daimyo
- Commands: Yonezawa castle
- Battles/wars: Tenbun War

Date Harumune (伊達 晴宗, DAH-tay; 1519 – January 12, 1578) was a Japanese daimyō of the Sengoku period. Harumune was the fifteenth head of the Date Clan. He was the father of the sixteenth head, Date Terumune, and the grandfather of Date Masamune, the seventeenth head of the Date Clan.

== Biography ==
A son of Date Tanemune, the fourteenth hereditary head of the Date Clan in Mutsu Province. Harumune's childhood name was Jiro (次郎). Harumune was intended to become head of the clan upon his father's death. However, Tanemune's method of consolidating power through the political marriages of his children led to the Tenbun War (天分の乱), a revolt led by Harumune. At first, Tanemune had the advantage but Harumune ultimately succeeded his father as leader of the clan. Harumune then moved to Yonezawa and worked to settle the aftermath of the war.

As a special honor, Ashikaga Yoshiharu gave permission for Harumune to use one ideograph (haru-) of his name. Additionally, the Ashikaga shogunate gave Harumune power and responsibilities as tendai of Mutsu.

== Family ==
The emblem (mon) of the Date clan

- Father: Date Tanemune
- Mother: Teishin'in
- Wife: Kubohime (1521–1594)
- Children:
  - Iwaki Chikataka (d. 1594) by Kubohime
  - Onamihime (1541–1602) married Nikaido Moriyoshi by Kubohime
  - Date Terumune by Kubohime
  - daughter married Date Sanemoto (brother of Harumune) by Kubohime
  - daughter married Koyanagawa Morimune by Kubohime
  - daughter married Satake Yoshishige by Kubohime
  - Rusu Masakage by Kubohime
  - Ishikawa Akimitsu by Kubohime
  - Hikohime married Ashina Morioki later married Ashina Moritaka by Kubohime
  - Kokubu Morishige by Kubohime
  - Sugime Naomune (d. 1584) by Kubohime
