= Matsumori Castle =

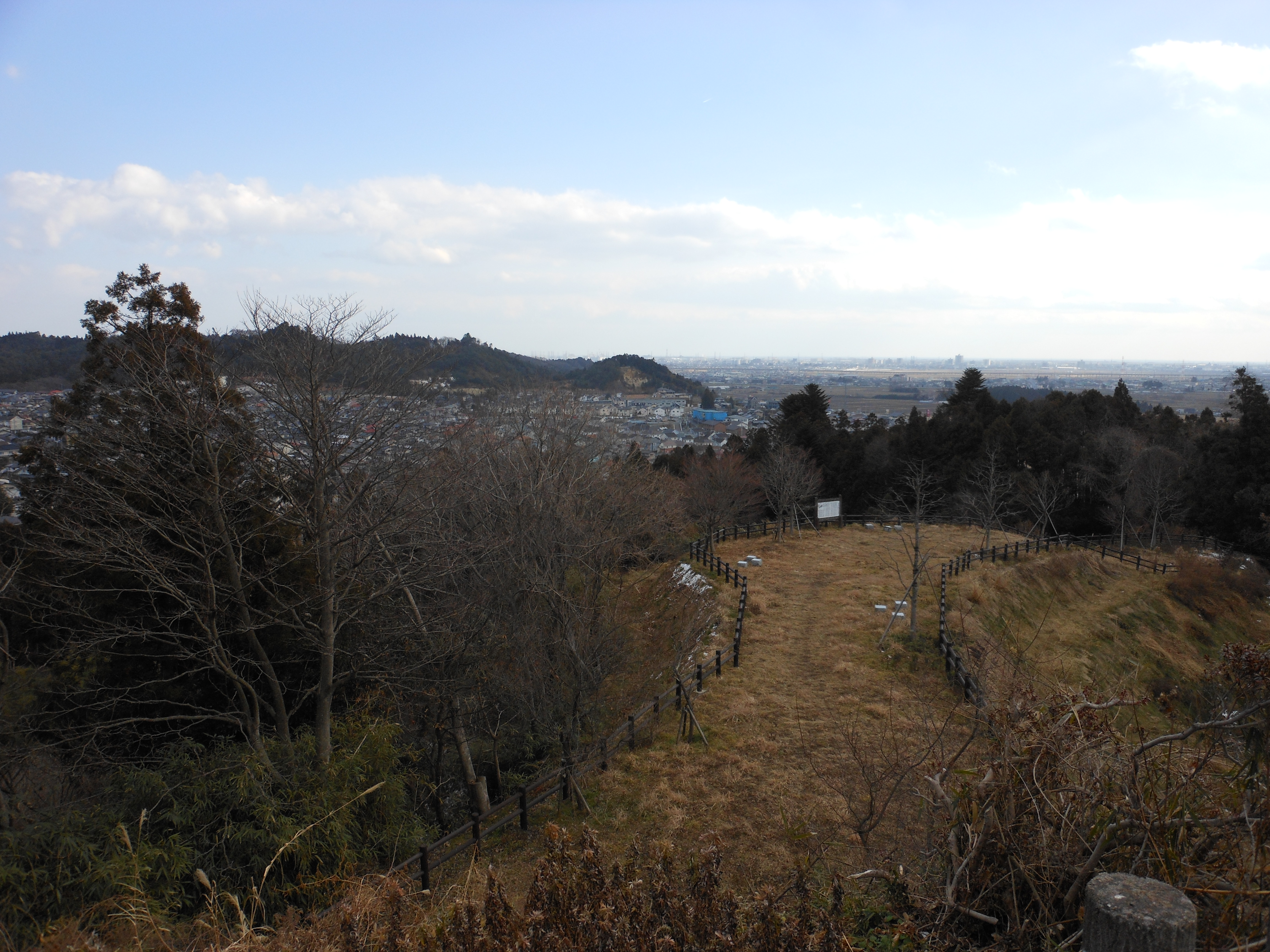
Matsumori Castle remains

Matsumori Castle (松森城, Matsumori-jō), also known as Matsumoridate (松森館), was a Japanese castle in Mutsu Province. Located in modern-day Izumi-ku, Miyagi Prefecture, the castle belonged to the Kokubu clan, which ruled the area before the entry of the Date clan. Matsumoridate was also known as Flying Crane Castle (Tsuru-ga-jō 鶴ヶ城), because of its similarity in appearance to the spread wings of a flying crane. The last lord of the castle was Kokubu Morishige. After the entry of the Date clan, the castle was largely dismantled and became the traditional grounds for the Date clan's new year's falconry trips.
