= List of minor planets: 87001–88000 =

The following is a partial list of minor planets, running from minor-planet number 87001 through 88000, inclusive. The primary data for this and other partial lists is based on JPL's "Small-Body Orbital Elements" and data available from the Minor Planet Center. Critical list information is also provided by the MPC, unless otherwise specified from Lowell Observatory. A detailed description of the table's columns and additional sources are given on the main page including a complete list of every page in this series, and a statistical break-up on the dynamical classification of minor planets.

Also see the summary list of all named bodies in numerical and alphabetical order, and the corresponding naming citations for the number range of this particular list. New namings may only be added to this list after official publication, as the preannouncement of names is condemned by the Working Group for Small Bodies Nomenclature of the International Astronomical Union.

Near-Earth obj.	MBA (inner)	MBA (outer)	Centaur
Mars-crosser	MBA (middle)	Jupiter trojan	Trans-Neptunian obj.
Unclassified

== 87001–87100 ==
Designation			Discovery			Properties		Ref
Permanent	Provisional	Named after	Date	Site	Discoverer(s)	Category	Diam.	Ref
87001	2000 JN_{44}	—	May 7, 2000	Socorro	LINEAR	·	3.3 km	MPC · JPL
87002	2000 JK_{46}	—	May 7, 2000	Socorro	LINEAR	·	3.1 km	MPC · JPL
87003	2000 JL_{46}	—	May 7, 2000	Socorro	LINEAR	·	3.1 km	MPC · JPL
87004	2000 JU_{49}	—	May 9, 2000	Socorro	LINEAR	·	1.9 km	MPC · JPL
87005	2000 JJ_{52}	—	May 9, 2000	Socorro	LINEAR	·	2.3 km	MPC · JPL
87006	2000 JU_{53}	—	May 11, 2000	Socorro	LINEAR	PAL	6.1 km	MPC · JPL
87007	2000 JF_{55}	—	May 6, 2000	Socorro	LINEAR	·	2.2 km	MPC · JPL
87008	2000 JK_{55}	—	May 6, 2000	Socorro	LINEAR	·	2.7 km	MPC · JPL
87009	2000 JN_{55}	—	May 6, 2000	Socorro	LINEAR	·	2.5 km	MPC · JPL
87010	2000 JR_{55}	—	May 6, 2000	Socorro	LINEAR	·	2.7 km	MPC · JPL
87011	2000 JQ_{56}	—	May 6, 2000	Socorro	LINEAR	·	2.5 km	MPC · JPL
87012	2000 JM_{57}	—	May 6, 2000	Socorro	LINEAR	(5)	2.9 km	MPC · JPL
87013	2000 JP_{57}	—	May 6, 2000	Socorro	LINEAR	V	1.8 km	MPC · JPL
87014	2000 JV_{57}	—	May 6, 2000	Socorro	LINEAR	·	2.9 km	MPC · JPL
87015	2000 JJ_{58}	—	May 6, 2000	Socorro	LINEAR	·	2.0 km	MPC · JPL
87016	2000 JJ_{62}	—	May 7, 2000	Socorro	LINEAR	·	3.0 km	MPC · JPL
87017	2000 JJ_{63}	—	May 9, 2000	Socorro	LINEAR	·	2.1 km	MPC · JPL
87018	2000 JL_{63}	—	May 9, 2000	Socorro	LINEAR	(2076)	2.4 km	MPC · JPL
87019	2000 JY_{63}	—	May 10, 2000	Socorro	LINEAR	·	2.2 km	MPC · JPL
87020	2000 JA_{64}	—	May 10, 2000	Socorro	LINEAR	·	2.4 km	MPC · JPL
87021	2000 JR_{65}	—	May 6, 2000	Socorro	LINEAR	·	3.2 km	MPC · JPL
87022	2000 JU_{65}	—	May 6, 2000	Socorro	LINEAR	·	2.2 km	MPC · JPL
87023	2000 JC_{66}	—	May 6, 2000	Socorro	LINEAR	·	1.9 km	MPC · JPL
87024	2000 JS_{66}	—	May 5, 2000	Socorro	LINEAR	APO	640 m	MPC · JPL
87025	2000 JT_{66}	—	May 7, 2000	Anderson Mesa	LONEOS	APO +1km	860 m	MPC · JPL
87026	2000 JH_{76}	—	May 6, 2000	Socorro	LINEAR	·	2.1 km	MPC · JPL
87027	2000 JJ_{77}	—	May 7, 2000	Socorro	LINEAR	NYS	2.1 km	MPC · JPL
87028	2000 JA_{78}	—	May 9, 2000	Socorro	LINEAR	·	3.0 km	MPC · JPL
87029	2000 JP_{81}	—	May 9, 2000	Socorro	LINEAR	·	2.3 km	MPC · JPL
87030	2000 JO_{82}	—	May 7, 2000	Socorro	LINEAR	NYS	2.7 km	MPC · JPL
87031	2000 JS_{83}	—	May 6, 2000	Socorro	LINEAR	·	2.2 km	MPC · JPL
87032	2000 JE_{84}	—	May 5, 2000	Socorro	LINEAR	·	2.4 km	MPC · JPL
87033	2000 KK	—	May 24, 2000	Prescott	P. G. Comba	·	3.0 km	MPC · JPL
87034	2000 KT_{1}	—	May 26, 2000	Prescott	P. G. Comba	·	2.8 km	MPC · JPL
87035	2000 KE_{2}	—	May 26, 2000	Socorro	LINEAR	·	5.2 km	MPC · JPL
87036	2000 KW_{3}	—	May 27, 2000	Socorro	LINEAR	·	2.5 km	MPC · JPL
87037	2000 KC_{4}	—	May 27, 2000	Reedy Creek	J. Broughton	·	2.2 km	MPC · JPL
87038	2000 KU_{4}	—	May 27, 2000	Socorro	LINEAR	PHO	5.3 km	MPC · JPL
87039	2000 KT_{5}	—	May 27, 2000	Socorro	LINEAR	·	2.2 km	MPC · JPL
87040	2000 KJ_{6}	—	May 27, 2000	Socorro	LINEAR	NYS	2.2 km	MPC · JPL
87041	2000 KV_{6}	—	May 27, 2000	Socorro	LINEAR	·	2.0 km	MPC · JPL
87042	2000 KX_{6}	—	May 27, 2000	Socorro	LINEAR	·	2.2 km	MPC · JPL
87043	2000 KQ_{7}	—	May 27, 2000	Socorro	LINEAR	NYS ·	3.6 km	MPC · JPL
87044	2000 KC_{8}	—	May 27, 2000	Socorro	LINEAR	·	2.7 km	MPC · JPL
87045	2000 KJ_{9}	—	May 28, 2000	Socorro	LINEAR	·	2.6 km	MPC · JPL
87046	2000 KT_{12}	—	May 28, 2000	Socorro	LINEAR	·	1.8 km	MPC · JPL
87047	2000 KZ_{16}	—	May 28, 2000	Socorro	LINEAR	NYS	2.1 km	MPC · JPL
87048	2000 KT_{20}	—	May 28, 2000	Socorro	LINEAR	·	2.9 km	MPC · JPL
87049	2000 KP_{21}	—	May 28, 2000	Socorro	LINEAR	·	2.2 km	MPC · JPL
87050	2000 KS_{21}	—	May 28, 2000	Socorro	LINEAR	NYS ·	3.2 km	MPC · JPL
87051	2000 KO_{26}	—	May 28, 2000	Socorro	LINEAR	·	2.9 km	MPC · JPL
87052	2000 KG_{27}	—	May 28, 2000	Socorro	LINEAR	fast	4.3 km	MPC · JPL
87053	2000 KZ_{29}	—	May 28, 2000	Socorro	LINEAR	EUN	3.6 km	MPC · JPL
87054	2000 KU_{30}	—	May 28, 2000	Socorro	LINEAR	·	3.8 km	MPC · JPL
87055	2000 KP_{32}	—	May 28, 2000	Socorro	LINEAR	MAS	1.6 km	MPC · JPL
87056	2000 KX_{34}	—	May 27, 2000	Socorro	LINEAR	·	2.6 km	MPC · JPL
87057	2000 KD_{35}	—	May 27, 2000	Socorro	LINEAR	·	2.8 km	MPC · JPL
87058	2000 KY_{35}	—	May 27, 2000	Socorro	LINEAR	·	2.4 km	MPC · JPL
87059	2000 KZ_{36}	—	May 29, 2000	Socorro	LINEAR	·	2.0 km	MPC · JPL
87060	2000 KF_{39}	—	May 24, 2000	Kitt Peak	Spacewatch	·	2.3 km	MPC · JPL
87061	2000 KP_{45}	—	May 30, 2000	Kitt Peak	Spacewatch	·	3.5 km	MPC · JPL
87062	2000 KC_{53}	—	May 28, 2000	Socorro	LINEAR	·	3.2 km	MPC · JPL
87063	2000 KO_{53}	—	May 29, 2000	Socorro	LINEAR	·	5.0 km	MPC · JPL
87064	2000 KW_{54}	—	May 27, 2000	Socorro	LINEAR	·	2.8 km	MPC · JPL
87065	2000 KM_{56}	—	May 27, 2000	Socorro	LINEAR	·	2.3 km	MPC · JPL
87066	2000 KP_{56}	—	May 27, 2000	Socorro	LINEAR	·	4.2 km	MPC · JPL
87067	2000 KA_{57}	—	May 28, 2000	Socorro	LINEAR	·	2.4 km	MPC · JPL
87068	2000 KN_{58}	—	May 24, 2000	Anderson Mesa	LONEOS	·	2.4 km	MPC · JPL
87069	2000 KE_{59}	—	May 24, 2000	Kitt Peak	Spacewatch	·	1.8 km	MPC · JPL
87070	2000 KP_{59}	—	May 25, 2000	Anderson Mesa	LONEOS	EUN	2.6 km	MPC · JPL
87071	2000 KM_{61}	—	May 25, 2000	Anderson Mesa	LONEOS	·	3.5 km	MPC · JPL
87072	2000 KF_{62}	—	May 26, 2000	Anderson Mesa	LONEOS	EUN	2.7 km	MPC · JPL
87073	2000 KF_{66}	—	May 27, 2000	Socorro	LINEAR	·	4.6 km	MPC · JPL
87074	2000 KC_{68}	—	May 30, 2000	Socorro	LINEAR	·	2.0 km	MPC · JPL
87075	2000 KK_{70}	—	May 28, 2000	Socorro	LINEAR	·	1.9 km	MPC · JPL
87076	2000 KL_{73}	—	May 28, 2000	Anderson Mesa	LONEOS	·	5.3 km	MPC · JPL
87077	2000 KS_{73}	—	May 27, 2000	Socorro	LINEAR	ERI	3.3 km	MPC · JPL
87078	2000 KC_{74}	—	May 27, 2000	Socorro	LINEAR	V	1.5 km	MPC · JPL
87079	2000 KG_{75}	—	May 27, 2000	Socorro	LINEAR	·	3.6 km	MPC · JPL
87080	2000 KH_{75}	—	May 27, 2000	Socorro	LINEAR	·	1.7 km	MPC · JPL
87081	2000 KH_{76}	—	May 27, 2000	Socorro	LINEAR	·	2.2 km	MPC · JPL
87082	2000 KU_{76}	—	May 27, 2000	Socorro	LINEAR	·	1.8 km	MPC · JPL
87083	2000 KV_{76}	—	May 27, 2000	Socorro	LINEAR	V	1.5 km	MPC · JPL
87084	2000 KY_{76}	—	May 27, 2000	Socorro	LINEAR	MAR	2.2 km	MPC · JPL
87085	2000 KU_{78}	—	May 27, 2000	Socorro	LINEAR	·	2.3 km	MPC · JPL
87086	2000 KZ_{81}	—	May 24, 2000	Anderson Mesa	LONEOS	·	2.1 km	MPC · JPL
87087	2000 KA_{83}	—	May 25, 2000	Anderson Mesa	LONEOS	·	2.6 km	MPC · JPL
87088 Joannewheeler	2000 LY	Joannewheeler	June 2, 2000	Ondřejov	P. Pravec, P. Kušnirák	·	2.2 km	MPC · JPL
87089	2000 LF_{1}	—	June 1, 2000	Črni Vrh	Matičič, S.	·	4.4 km	MPC · JPL
87090	2000 LX_{2}	—	June 4, 2000	Socorro	LINEAR	·	7.1 km	MPC · JPL
87091	2000 LB_{3}	—	June 5, 2000	Socorro	LINEAR	PHO	2.6 km	MPC · JPL
87092	2000 LK_{3}	—	June 4, 2000	Socorro	LINEAR	·	5.2 km	MPC · JPL
87093	2000 LW_{6}	—	June 1, 2000	Kitt Peak	Spacewatch	V	2.1 km	MPC · JPL
87094	2000 LA_{7}	—	June 1, 2000	Kitt Peak	Spacewatch	·	2.7 km	MPC · JPL
87095	2000 LO_{7}	—	June 5, 2000	Socorro	LINEAR	·	3.5 km	MPC · JPL
87096	2000 LU_{9}	—	June 6, 2000	Socorro	LINEAR	NYS	3.0 km	MPC · JPL
87097 Lomaki	2000 LJ_{10}	Lomaki	June 7, 2000	Kleť	M. Tichý, J. Tichá	·	3.1 km	MPC · JPL
87098	2000 LS_{10}	—	June 1, 2000	Socorro	LINEAR	·	6.1 km	MPC · JPL
87099	2000 LV_{12}	—	June 5, 2000	Socorro	LINEAR	·	3.2 km	MPC · JPL
87100	2000 LU_{14}	—	June 7, 2000	Socorro	LINEAR	EUN	3.8 km	MPC · JPL

== 87101–87200 ==
back to top

Designation			Discovery			Properties		Ref
Permanent	Provisional	Named after	Date	Site	Discoverer(s)	Category	Diam.	Ref
87101	2000 LD_{17}	—	June 4, 2000	Socorro	LINEAR	·	5.8 km	MPC · JPL
87102	2000 LT_{17}	—	June 8, 2000	Socorro	LINEAR	·	3.4 km	MPC · JPL
87103	2000 LX_{17}	—	June 8, 2000	Socorro	LINEAR	EUN	2.8 km	MPC · JPL
87104	2000 LH_{18}	—	June 8, 2000	Socorro	LINEAR	ADE	5.0 km	MPC · JPL
87105	2000 LX_{18}	—	June 8, 2000	Socorro	LINEAR	EUN	3.0 km	MPC · JPL
87106	2000 LZ_{18}	—	June 8, 2000	Socorro	LINEAR	·	2.6 km	MPC · JPL
87107	2000 LD_{20}	—	June 8, 2000	Socorro	LINEAR	·	3.6 km	MPC · JPL
87108	2000 LU_{20}	—	June 8, 2000	Socorro	LINEAR	·	5.8 km	MPC · JPL
87109	2000 LA_{21}	—	June 8, 2000	Socorro	LINEAR	·	5.2 km	MPC · JPL
87110	2000 LW_{21}	—	June 8, 2000	Socorro	LINEAR	·	5.2 km	MPC · JPL
87111	2000 LJ_{23}	—	June 3, 2000	Anderson Mesa	LONEOS	EUN	2.7 km	MPC · JPL
87112	2000 LB_{25}	—	June 1, 2000	Socorro	LINEAR	PHO	3.6 km	MPC · JPL
87113	2000 LN_{25}	—	June 7, 2000	Socorro	LINEAR	(5)	3.3 km	MPC · JPL
87114	2000 LS_{27}	—	June 6, 2000	Anderson Mesa	LONEOS	·	6.2 km	MPC · JPL
87115	2000 LR_{28}	—	June 9, 2000	Anderson Mesa	LONEOS	(5)	3.2 km	MPC · JPL
87116	2000 LQ_{30}	—	June 9, 2000	Anderson Mesa	LONEOS	EUN	3.9 km	MPC · JPL
87117	2000 LJ_{32}	—	June 5, 2000	Anderson Mesa	LONEOS	·	5.2 km	MPC · JPL
87118	2000 LB_{34}	—	June 3, 2000	Haleakala	NEAT	·	2.6 km	MPC · JPL
87119	2000 LC_{34}	—	June 3, 2000	Kitt Peak	Spacewatch	V	1.1 km	MPC · JPL
87120	2000 LO_{34}	—	June 3, 2000	Anderson Mesa	LONEOS	JUN	3.1 km	MPC · JPL
87121	2000 LG_{35}	—	June 1, 2000	Haleakala	NEAT	EUN	2.2 km	MPC · JPL
87122	2000 LB_{36}	—	June 1, 2000	Haleakala	NEAT	·	2.5 km	MPC · JPL
87123	2000 MO_{1}	—	June 25, 2000	Farpoint	Farpoint	·	2.2 km	MPC · JPL
87124	2000 MQ_{1}	—	June 26, 2000	Reedy Creek	J. Broughton	·	3.6 km	MPC · JPL
87125	2000 MS_{1}	—	June 25, 2000	Prescott	P. G. Comba	V	1.9 km	MPC · JPL
87126	2000 MF_{4}	—	June 24, 2000	Socorro	LINEAR	NYS	2.2 km	MPC · JPL
87127	2000 MM_{4}	—	June 25, 2000	Socorro	LINEAR	·	4.6 km	MPC · JPL
87128	2000 MR_{4}	—	June 25, 2000	Socorro	LINEAR	(5)	2.7 km	MPC · JPL
87129	2000 MB_{5}	—	June 26, 2000	Socorro	LINEAR	EUN	3.3 km	MPC · JPL
87130	2000 NE	—	July 1, 2000	Prescott	P. G. Comba	·	2.5 km	MPC · JPL
87131	2000 NU_{1}	—	July 4, 2000	Kitt Peak	Spacewatch	·	2.1 km	MPC · JPL
87132	2000 NO_{4}	—	July 3, 2000	Kitt Peak	Spacewatch	·	2.0 km	MPC · JPL
87133	2000 NY_{4}	—	July 7, 2000	Socorro	LINEAR	slow	2.9 km	MPC · JPL
87134	2000 NS_{5}	—	July 8, 2000	Socorro	LINEAR	slow	4.6 km	MPC · JPL
87135	2000 NU_{5}	—	July 8, 2000	Socorro	LINEAR	·	5.1 km	MPC · JPL
87136	2000 NU_{6}	—	July 4, 2000	Kitt Peak	Spacewatch	·	2.7 km	MPC · JPL
87137	2000 ND_{8}	—	July 5, 2000	Kitt Peak	Spacewatch	·	2.2 km	MPC · JPL
87138	2000 NA_{11}	—	July 10, 2000	Valinhos	P. R. Holvorcem	DOR	7.6 km	MPC · JPL
87139	2000 ND_{12}	—	July 5, 2000	Anderson Mesa	LONEOS	PHO	3.4 km	MPC · JPL
87140	2000 NZ_{12}	—	July 5, 2000	Anderson Mesa	LONEOS	(5)	2.7 km	MPC · JPL
87141	2000 ND_{13}	—	July 5, 2000	Anderson Mesa	LONEOS	·	2.6 km	MPC · JPL
87142 Delsanti	2000 NL_{13}	Delsanti	July 5, 2000	Anderson Mesa	LONEOS	·	8.9 km	MPC · JPL
87143	2000 NQ_{14}	—	July 5, 2000	Anderson Mesa	LONEOS	·	3.1 km	MPC · JPL
87144	2000 NT_{14}	—	July 5, 2000	Anderson Mesa	LONEOS	·	5.9 km	MPC · JPL
87145	2000 NC_{15}	—	July 5, 2000	Anderson Mesa	LONEOS	·	3.7 km	MPC · JPL
87146	2000 NG_{16}	—	July 5, 2000	Anderson Mesa	LONEOS	RAF	2.1 km	MPC · JPL
87147	2000 NM_{16}	—	July 5, 2000	Anderson Mesa	LONEOS	·	2.9 km	MPC · JPL
87148	2000 NH_{17}	—	July 5, 2000	Anderson Mesa	LONEOS	·	1.8 km	MPC · JPL
87149	2000 NS_{18}	—	July 5, 2000	Anderson Mesa	LONEOS	·	3.7 km	MPC · JPL
87150	2000 NW_{18}	—	July 5, 2000	Anderson Mesa	LONEOS	EUN	2.9 km	MPC · JPL
87151	2000 NZ_{18}	—	July 5, 2000	Anderson Mesa	LONEOS	·	2.4 km	MPC · JPL
87152	2000 NF_{20}	—	July 6, 2000	Kitt Peak	Spacewatch	·	3.4 km	MPC · JPL
87153	2000 NR_{20}	—	July 6, 2000	Kitt Peak	Spacewatch	·	2.1 km	MPC · JPL
87154	2000 NB_{21}	—	July 6, 2000	Anderson Mesa	LONEOS	·	3.6 km	MPC · JPL
87155	2000 NF_{21}	—	July 7, 2000	Anderson Mesa	LONEOS	·	3.6 km	MPC · JPL
87156	2000 NM_{21}	—	July 7, 2000	Socorro	LINEAR	·	2.7 km	MPC · JPL
87157	2000 NK_{22}	—	July 7, 2000	Anderson Mesa	LONEOS	·	3.3 km	MPC · JPL
87158	2000 NP_{22}	—	July 7, 2000	Anderson Mesa	LONEOS	·	7.1 km	MPC · JPL
87159	2000 NH_{23}	—	July 5, 2000	Kitt Peak	Spacewatch	·	2.7 km	MPC · JPL
87160	2000 NK_{24}	—	July 4, 2000	Anderson Mesa	LONEOS	DOR	5.0 km	MPC · JPL
87161	2000 NY_{24}	—	July 4, 2000	Anderson Mesa	LONEOS	·	3.1 km	MPC · JPL
87162	2000 NM_{25}	—	July 4, 2000	Anderson Mesa	LONEOS	(5)	2.6 km	MPC · JPL
87163	2000 NN_{25}	—	July 4, 2000	Anderson Mesa	LONEOS	·	4.1 km	MPC · JPL
87164	2000 NU_{25}	—	July 4, 2000	Anderson Mesa	LONEOS	MAS	2.1 km	MPC · JPL
87165	2000 NF_{27}	—	July 4, 2000	Anderson Mesa	LONEOS	·	6.4 km	MPC · JPL
87166	2000 NL_{28}	—	July 3, 2000	Socorro	LINEAR	EUN	3.0 km	MPC · JPL
87167	2000 NQ_{28}	—	July 2, 2000	Kitt Peak	Spacewatch	V	1.9 km	MPC · JPL
87168	2000 OW	—	July 24, 2000	Reedy Creek	J. Broughton	BRG	3.5 km	MPC · JPL
87169	2000 OP_{2}	—	July 27, 2000	Črni Vrh	Mikuž, H.	·	4.1 km	MPC · JPL
87170	2000 OS_{3}	—	July 24, 2000	Socorro	LINEAR	·	5.6 km	MPC · JPL
87171	2000 OP_{4}	—	July 24, 2000	Socorro	LINEAR	PHO	2.3 km	MPC · JPL
87172	2000 OR_{4}	—	July 24, 2000	Socorro	LINEAR	·	3.5 km	MPC · JPL
87173	2000 OE_{5}	—	July 24, 2000	Socorro	LINEAR	EUN · slow	3.3 km	MPC · JPL
87174	2000 OF_{5}	—	July 24, 2000	Socorro	LINEAR	·	3.6 km	MPC · JPL
87175	2000 OY_{5}	—	July 24, 2000	Socorro	LINEAR	EUN	2.9 km	MPC · JPL
87176	2000 OZ_{5}	—	July 24, 2000	Socorro	LINEAR	EUN · slow	4.3 km	MPC · JPL
87177	2000 OJ_{6}	—	July 29, 2000	Socorro	LINEAR	V	1.9 km	MPC · JPL
87178	2000 OZ_{6}	—	July 28, 2000	Črni Vrh	Mikuž, H.	EUN	3.1 km	MPC · JPL
87179	2000 ON_{7}	—	July 30, 2000	Socorro	LINEAR	·	7.5 km	MPC · JPL
87180	2000 OT_{7}	—	July 24, 2000	Socorro	LINEAR	EUN	4.1 km	MPC · JPL
87181	2000 OC_{8}	—	July 30, 2000	Socorro	LINEAR	EUN	2.9 km	MPC · JPL
87182	2000 OB_{9}	—	July 31, 2000	Socorro	LINEAR	·	3.5 km	MPC · JPL
87183	2000 OX_{9}	—	July 23, 2000	Socorro	LINEAR	·	5.4 km	MPC · JPL
87184	2000 OC_{10}	—	July 23, 2000	Socorro	LINEAR	·	2.1 km	MPC · JPL
87185	2000 OP_{12}	—	July 23, 2000	Socorro	LINEAR	NYS ·	4.6 km	MPC · JPL
87186	2000 OG_{13}	—	July 23, 2000	Socorro	LINEAR	·	3.6 km	MPC · JPL
87187	2000 OQ_{13}	—	July 23, 2000	Socorro	LINEAR	·	2.3 km	MPC · JPL
87188	2000 OL_{14}	—	July 23, 2000	Socorro	LINEAR	NEM ·	5.7 km	MPC · JPL
87189	2000 OM_{14}	—	July 23, 2000	Socorro	LINEAR	NYS	1.9 km	MPC · JPL
87190	2000 OR_{14}	—	July 23, 2000	Socorro	LINEAR	·	3.1 km	MPC · JPL
87191	2000 OM_{15}	—	July 23, 2000	Socorro	LINEAR	·	5.3 km	MPC · JPL
87192	2000 OG_{17}	—	July 23, 2000	Socorro	LINEAR	NYS	2.9 km	MPC · JPL
87193	2000 OS_{17}	—	July 23, 2000	Socorro	LINEAR	·	5.4 km	MPC · JPL
87194	2000 OK_{18}	—	July 23, 2000	Socorro	LINEAR	·	2.7 km	MPC · JPL
87195	2000 OW_{18}	—	July 23, 2000	Socorro	LINEAR	·	2.9 km	MPC · JPL
87196	2000 OG_{20}	—	July 30, 2000	Socorro	LINEAR	·	2.8 km	MPC · JPL
87197	2000 OE_{22}	—	July 30, 2000	Socorro	LINEAR	·	2.3 km	MPC · JPL
87198	2000 OQ_{22}	—	July 31, 2000	Socorro	LINEAR	·	3.5 km	MPC · JPL
87199	2000 OD_{24}	—	July 23, 2000	Socorro	LINEAR	NYS	3.0 km	MPC · JPL
87200	2000 OV_{24}	—	July 23, 2000	Socorro	LINEAR	·	3.1 km	MPC · JPL

== 87201–87300 ==
back to top

Designation			Discovery			Properties		Ref
Permanent	Provisional	Named after	Date	Site	Discoverer(s)	Category	Diam.	Ref
87201	2000 OO_{25}	—	July 23, 2000	Socorro	LINEAR	·	3.6 km	MPC · JPL
87202	2000 OV_{25}	—	July 23, 2000	Socorro	LINEAR	·	3.8 km	MPC · JPL
87203	2000 OL_{26}	—	July 23, 2000	Socorro	LINEAR	MAS	2.1 km	MPC · JPL
87204	2000 OL_{29}	—	July 30, 2000	Socorro	LINEAR	·	3.3 km	MPC · JPL
87205	2000 OB_{30}	—	July 30, 2000	Socorro	LINEAR	·	3.2 km	MPC · JPL
87206	2000 ON_{31}	—	July 30, 2000	Socorro	LINEAR	EUN	3.7 km	MPC · JPL
87207	2000 OO_{32}	—	July 30, 2000	Socorro	LINEAR	·	4.0 km	MPC · JPL
87208	2000 OQ_{32}	—	July 30, 2000	Socorro	LINEAR	·	2.2 km	MPC · JPL
87209	2000 OW_{32}	—	July 30, 2000	Socorro	LINEAR	·	2.4 km	MPC · JPL
87210	2000 OS_{35}	—	July 31, 2000	Socorro	LINEAR	·	3.6 km	MPC · JPL
87211	2000 OP_{36}	—	July 30, 2000	Socorro	LINEAR	·	5.5 km	MPC · JPL
87212	2000 OQ_{36}	—	July 30, 2000	Socorro	LINEAR	·	2.4 km	MPC · JPL
87213	2000 OT_{36}	—	July 30, 2000	Socorro	LINEAR	·	4.3 km	MPC · JPL
87214	2000 OX_{36}	—	July 30, 2000	Socorro	LINEAR	·	2.4 km	MPC · JPL
87215	2000 OM_{37}	—	July 30, 2000	Socorro	LINEAR	·	6.6 km	MPC · JPL
87216	2000 OG_{38}	—	July 30, 2000	Socorro	LINEAR	·	3.3 km	MPC · JPL
87217	2000 OO_{38}	—	July 30, 2000	Socorro	LINEAR	·	4.7 km	MPC · JPL
87218	2000 OS_{38}	—	July 30, 2000	Socorro	LINEAR	·	2.7 km	MPC · JPL
87219 Marcbernstein	2000 OH_{39}	Marcbernstein	July 30, 2000	Socorro	LINEAR	·	2.6 km	MPC · JPL
87220	2000 OK_{40}	—	July 30, 2000	Socorro	LINEAR	EUN	2.3 km	MPC · JPL
87221	2000 OQ_{40}	—	July 30, 2000	Socorro	LINEAR	·	2.5 km	MPC · JPL
87222	2000 OV_{40}	—	July 30, 2000	Socorro	LINEAR	(1298)	7.1 km	MPC · JPL
87223	2000 OD_{41}	—	July 30, 2000	Socorro	LINEAR	V	2.8 km	MPC · JPL
87224	2000 OG_{41}	—	July 30, 2000	Socorro	LINEAR	·	7.1 km	MPC · JPL
87225	2000 OP_{41}	—	July 30, 2000	Socorro	LINEAR	·	3.6 km	MPC · JPL
87226	2000 OY_{41}	—	July 30, 2000	Socorro	LINEAR	·	2.1 km	MPC · JPL
87227	2000 OC_{42}	—	July 30, 2000	Socorro	LINEAR	·	3.7 km	MPC · JPL
87228	2000 OD_{42}	—	July 30, 2000	Socorro	LINEAR	EOS	7.1 km	MPC · JPL
87229	2000 OO_{42}	—	July 30, 2000	Socorro	LINEAR	·	3.2 km	MPC · JPL
87230	2000 OZ_{42}	—	July 30, 2000	Socorro	LINEAR	·	2.3 km	MPC · JPL
87231	2000 OB_{43}	—	July 30, 2000	Socorro	LINEAR	EUN · slow	2.7 km	MPC · JPL
87232	2000 OC_{43}	—	July 30, 2000	Socorro	LINEAR	·	2.7 km	MPC · JPL
87233	2000 OE_{43}	—	July 30, 2000	Socorro	LINEAR	·	7.6 km	MPC · JPL
87234	2000 OX_{43}	—	July 30, 2000	Socorro	LINEAR	EUN	3.2 km	MPC · JPL
87235	2000 OM_{44}	—	July 30, 2000	Socorro	LINEAR	EUN	6.4 km	MPC · JPL
87236	2000 OO_{44}	—	July 30, 2000	Socorro	LINEAR	(5)	2.7 km	MPC · JPL
87237	2000 OP_{44}	—	July 30, 2000	Socorro	LINEAR	·	5.6 km	MPC · JPL
87238	2000 OA_{45}	—	July 30, 2000	Socorro	LINEAR	(5)	3.5 km	MPC · JPL
87239	2000 OH_{45}	—	July 30, 2000	Socorro	LINEAR	(1547)	3.1 km	MPC · JPL
87240	2000 OJ_{45}	—	July 30, 2000	Socorro	LINEAR	·	3.4 km	MPC · JPL
87241	2000 OL_{45}	—	July 30, 2000	Socorro	LINEAR	·	5.6 km	MPC · JPL
87242	2000 OU_{45}	—	July 30, 2000	Socorro	LINEAR	HYG	6.1 km	MPC · JPL
87243	2000 OV_{45}	—	July 30, 2000	Socorro	LINEAR	·	3.1 km	MPC · JPL
87244	2000 OT_{46}	—	July 31, 2000	Socorro	LINEAR	·	6.5 km	MPC · JPL
87245	2000 OX_{46}	—	July 31, 2000	Socorro	LINEAR	·	4.4 km	MPC · JPL
87246	2000 OA_{47}	—	July 31, 2000	Socorro	LINEAR	PHO	4.4 km	MPC · JPL
87247	2000 OB_{47}	—	July 31, 2000	Socorro	LINEAR	(5)	2.4 km	MPC · JPL
87248	2000 OQ_{47}	—	July 31, 2000	Socorro	LINEAR	MAR	4.2 km	MPC · JPL
87249	2000 OR_{47}	—	July 31, 2000	Socorro	LINEAR	·	3.4 km	MPC · JPL
87250	2000 OX_{47}	—	July 31, 2000	Socorro	LINEAR	·	3.2 km	MPC · JPL
87251	2000 OV_{49}	—	July 31, 2000	Socorro	LINEAR	·	3.6 km	MPC · JPL
87252	2000 OM_{50}	—	July 31, 2000	Socorro	LINEAR	·	5.4 km	MPC · JPL
87253	2000 OT_{50}	—	July 31, 2000	Socorro	LINEAR	(5)	2.8 km	MPC · JPL
87254	2000 OY_{52}	—	July 31, 2000	Socorro	LINEAR	·	2.8 km	MPC · JPL
87255	2000 OB_{53}	—	July 30, 2000	Socorro	LINEAR	·	5.8 km	MPC · JPL
87256	2000 ON_{53}	—	July 30, 2000	Socorro	LINEAR	EUN	3.1 km	MPC · JPL
87257	2000 OO_{53}	—	July 30, 2000	Socorro	LINEAR	EUN	4.2 km	MPC · JPL
87258	2000 OP_{53}	—	July 30, 2000	Socorro	LINEAR	·	3.7 km	MPC · JPL
87259	2000 OW_{53}	—	July 30, 2000	Socorro	LINEAR	·	3.8 km	MPC · JPL
87260	2000 ON_{54}	—	July 29, 2000	Anderson Mesa	LONEOS	·	2.3 km	MPC · JPL
87261	2000 OQ_{55}	—	July 29, 2000	Anderson Mesa	LONEOS	·	2.6 km	MPC · JPL
87262	2000 OC_{56}	—	July 29, 2000	Anderson Mesa	LONEOS	·	2.5 km	MPC · JPL
87263	2000 OB_{57}	—	July 29, 2000	Anderson Mesa	LONEOS	·	2.2 km	MPC · JPL
87264	2000 OY_{57}	—	July 29, 2000	Anderson Mesa	LONEOS	V	1.6 km	MPC · JPL
87265	2000 OL_{58}	—	July 29, 2000	Anderson Mesa	LONEOS	·	4.2 km	MPC · JPL
87266	2000 OK_{59}	—	July 29, 2000	Anderson Mesa	LONEOS	·	1.4 km	MPC · JPL
87267	2000 OM_{59}	—	July 29, 2000	Anderson Mesa	LONEOS	·	2.0 km	MPC · JPL
87268	2000 OR_{59}	—	July 29, 2000	Anderson Mesa	LONEOS	·	2.4 km	MPC · JPL
87269	2000 OO_{67}	—	July 29, 2000	Cerro Tololo	Deep Ecliptic Survey	centaur	80 km	MPC · JPL
87270	2000 OR_{69}	—	July 31, 2000	Cerro Tololo	M. W. Buie	TEL	3.2 km	MPC · JPL
87271 Kokubunji	2000 PY_{3}	Kokubunji	August 3, 2000	Bisei SG Center	BATTeRS	·	5.0 km	MPC · JPL
87272	2000 PL_{4}	—	August 1, 2000	Socorro	LINEAR	·	3.4 km	MPC · JPL
87273	2000 PP_{7}	—	August 2, 2000	Socorro	LINEAR	·	3.0 km	MPC · JPL
87274	2000 PB_{8}	—	August 3, 2000	Socorro	LINEAR	EUN	3.5 km	MPC · JPL
87275	2000 PZ_{8}	—	August 4, 2000	Siding Spring	R. H. McNaught	PHO	2.7 km	MPC · JPL
87276	2000 PE_{9}	—	August 6, 2000	Siding Spring	R. H. McNaught	·	8.7 km	MPC · JPL
87277	2000 PR_{11}	—	August 1, 2000	Socorro	LINEAR	EUN	2.5 km	MPC · JPL
87278	2000 PT_{11}	—	August 1, 2000	Socorro	LINEAR	·	6.5 km	MPC · JPL
87279	2000 PX_{11}	—	August 1, 2000	Socorro	LINEAR	·	2.8 km	MPC · JPL
87280	2000 PF_{12}	—	August 1, 2000	Socorro	LINEAR	·	5.7 km	MPC · JPL
87281	2000 PV_{12}	—	August 8, 2000	Socorro	LINEAR	·	4.1 km	MPC · JPL
87282	2000 PW_{12}	—	August 8, 2000	Socorro	LINEAR	·	8.9 km	MPC · JPL
87283	2000 PX_{12}	—	August 8, 2000	Socorro	LINEAR	·	5.0 km	MPC · JPL
87284	2000 PE_{14}	—	August 1, 2000	Socorro	LINEAR	·	3.1 km	MPC · JPL
87285	2000 PT_{14}	—	August 1, 2000	Socorro	LINEAR	·	3.7 km	MPC · JPL
87286	2000 PW_{14}	—	August 1, 2000	Socorro	LINEAR	·	2.8 km	MPC · JPL
87287	2000 PR_{16}	—	August 1, 2000	Socorro	LINEAR	·	2.7 km	MPC · JPL
87288	2000 PY_{16}	—	August 1, 2000	Socorro	LINEAR	·	2.6 km	MPC · JPL
87289	2000 PC_{17}	—	August 1, 2000	Socorro	LINEAR	KOR	3.6 km	MPC · JPL
87290	2000 PF_{18}	—	August 1, 2000	Socorro	LINEAR	·	2.6 km	MPC · JPL
87291	2000 PG_{18}	—	August 1, 2000	Socorro	LINEAR	·	4.3 km	MPC · JPL
87292	2000 PZ_{19}	—	August 1, 2000	Socorro	LINEAR	·	4.6 km	MPC · JPL
87293	2000 PK_{20}	—	August 1, 2000	Socorro	LINEAR	·	2.3 km	MPC · JPL
87294	2000 PR_{20}	—	August 1, 2000	Socorro	LINEAR	·	2.7 km	MPC · JPL
87295	2000 PT_{20}	—	August 1, 2000	Socorro	LINEAR	·	2.5 km	MPC · JPL
87296	2000 PK_{23}	—	August 2, 2000	Socorro	LINEAR	KOR	2.8 km	MPC · JPL
87297	2000 PL_{23}	—	August 2, 2000	Socorro	LINEAR	·	3.3 km	MPC · JPL
87298	2000 PA_{24}	—	August 2, 2000	Socorro	LINEAR	·	1.7 km	MPC · JPL
87299	2000 PU_{24}	—	August 3, 2000	Socorro	LINEAR	·	12 km	MPC · JPL
87300	2000 PF_{25}	—	August 3, 2000	Socorro	LINEAR	(5)	2.7 km	MPC · JPL

== 87301–87400 ==
back to top

Designation			Discovery			Properties		Ref
Permanent	Provisional	Named after	Date	Site	Discoverer(s)	Category	Diam.	Ref
87301	2000 PT_{25}	—	August 4, 2000	Socorro	LINEAR	MAR	3.6 km	MPC · JPL
87302	2000 PV_{25}	—	August 4, 2000	Socorro	LINEAR	·	5.5 km	MPC · JPL
87303	2000 PJ_{26}	—	August 5, 2000	Haleakala	NEAT	·	11 km	MPC · JPL
87304	2000 PY_{26}	—	August 9, 2000	Socorro	LINEAR	fast	3.2 km	MPC · JPL
87305	2000 PB_{27}	—	August 9, 2000	Socorro	LINEAR	·	6.5 km	MPC · JPL
87306	2000 PR_{27}	—	August 10, 2000	Socorro	LINEAR	PAL	7.2 km	MPC · JPL
87307	2000 PA_{28}	—	August 7, 2000	Bisei SG Center	BATTeRS	·	5.2 km	MPC · JPL
87308	2000 PY_{28}	—	August 2, 2000	Socorro	LINEAR	EUN	3.1 km	MPC · JPL
87309	2000 QP	—	August 21, 2000	Socorro	LINEAR	ATE +1km · fast	570 m	MPC · JPL
87310	2000 QE_{1}	—	August 23, 2000	Reedy Creek	J. Broughton	·	2.8 km	MPC · JPL
87311	2000 QJ_{1}	—	August 21, 2000	Anderson Mesa	LONEOS	APO +1km	1.9 km	MPC · JPL
87312 Akirasuzuki	2000 QK_{1}	Akirasuzuki	August 23, 2000	Bisei SG Center	BATTeRS	EUN	5.8 km	MPC · JPL
87313	2000 QB_{3}	—	August 24, 2000	Socorro	LINEAR	·	2.7 km	MPC · JPL
87314	2000 QJ_{3}	—	August 24, 2000	Socorro	LINEAR	·	3.0 km	MPC · JPL
87315	2000 QV_{4}	—	August 24, 2000	Socorro	LINEAR	·	2.6 km	MPC · JPL
87316	2000 QL_{5}	—	August 24, 2000	Socorro	LINEAR	·	4.4 km	MPC · JPL
87317	2000 QM_{5}	—	August 24, 2000	Socorro	LINEAR	·	2.1 km	MPC · JPL
87318	2000 QS_{8}	—	August 24, 2000	Črni Vrh	Skvarč, J.	·	7.2 km	MPC · JPL
87319	2000 QD_{9}	—	August 25, 2000	Črni Vrh	Mikuž, H.	·	3.4 km	MPC · JPL
87320	2000 QX_{9}	—	August 24, 2000	Socorro	LINEAR	·	6.5 km	MPC · JPL
87321	2000 QA_{10}	—	August 24, 2000	Socorro	LINEAR	·	2.7 km	MPC · JPL
87322	2000 QX_{10}	—	August 24, 2000	Socorro	LINEAR	slow	2.7 km	MPC · JPL
87323	2000 QB_{11}	—	August 24, 2000	Socorro	LINEAR	·	3.5 km	MPC · JPL
87324	2000 QH_{11}	—	August 24, 2000	Socorro	LINEAR	·	3.5 km	MPC · JPL
87325	2000 QM_{11}	—	August 24, 2000	Socorro	LINEAR	RAF	1.7 km	MPC · JPL
87326	2000 QV_{13}	—	August 24, 2000	Socorro	LINEAR	·	2.2 km	MPC · JPL
87327	2000 QZ_{16}	—	August 24, 2000	Socorro	LINEAR	·	2.0 km	MPC · JPL
87328	2000 QC_{17}	—	August 24, 2000	Socorro	LINEAR	·	2.8 km	MPC · JPL
87329	2000 QO_{17}	—	August 24, 2000	Socorro	LINEAR	KOR	2.7 km	MPC · JPL
87330	2000 QJ_{18}	—	August 24, 2000	Socorro	LINEAR	·	2.2 km	MPC · JPL
87331	2000 QX_{18}	—	August 24, 2000	Socorro	LINEAR	·	2.5 km	MPC · JPL
87332	2000 QF_{19}	—	August 24, 2000	Socorro	LINEAR	·	4.5 km	MPC · JPL
87333	2000 QB_{20}	—	August 24, 2000	Socorro	LINEAR	·	5.7 km	MPC · JPL
87334	2000 QK_{20}	—	August 24, 2000	Socorro	LINEAR	·	2.6 km	MPC · JPL
87335	2000 QB_{21}	—	August 24, 2000	Socorro	LINEAR	·	5.2 km	MPC · JPL
87336	2000 QA_{22}	—	August 24, 2000	Socorro	LINEAR	·	4.5 km	MPC · JPL
87337	2000 QE_{22}	—	August 24, 2000	Socorro	LINEAR	·	3.2 km	MPC · JPL
87338	2000 QP_{22}	—	August 25, 2000	Socorro	LINEAR	·	3.5 km	MPC · JPL
87339	2000 QQ_{22}	—	August 25, 2000	Socorro	LINEAR	·	3.4 km	MPC · JPL
87340	2000 QB_{23}	—	August 25, 2000	Socorro	LINEAR	·	4.3 km	MPC · JPL
87341	2000 QF_{23}	—	August 25, 2000	Socorro	LINEAR	·	3.3 km	MPC · JPL
87342	2000 QR_{23}	—	August 25, 2000	Socorro	LINEAR	·	2.6 km	MPC · JPL
87343	2000 QH_{25}	—	August 25, 2000	Socorro	LINEAR	H	1.7 km	MPC · JPL
87344	2000 QM_{25}	—	August 26, 2000	Socorro	LINEAR	·	5.8 km	MPC · JPL
87345	2000 QX_{25}	—	August 26, 2000	Socorro	LINEAR	·	7.9 km	MPC · JPL
87346	2000 QZ_{27}	—	August 24, 2000	Socorro	LINEAR	·	3.7 km	MPC · JPL
87347	2000 QR_{28}	—	August 24, 2000	Socorro	LINEAR	EUN	3.3 km	MPC · JPL
87348	2000 QR_{29}	—	August 24, 2000	Socorro	LINEAR	·	6.0 km	MPC · JPL
87349	2000 QU_{29}	—	August 25, 2000	Socorro	LINEAR	·	5.5 km	MPC · JPL
87350	2000 QW_{29}	—	August 25, 2000	Socorro	LINEAR	·	4.0 km	MPC · JPL
87351	2000 QE_{31}	—	August 26, 2000	Socorro	LINEAR	·	2.7 km	MPC · JPL
87352	2000 QJ_{32}	—	August 26, 2000	Socorro	LINEAR	·	2.9 km	MPC · JPL
87353	2000 QQ_{32}	—	August 26, 2000	Socorro	LINEAR	EUN	2.6 km	MPC · JPL
87354	2000 QR_{33}	—	August 26, 2000	Socorro	LINEAR	·	4.7 km	MPC · JPL
87355	2000 QC_{36}	—	August 24, 2000	Socorro	LINEAR	·	3.6 km	MPC · JPL
87356	2000 QU_{36}	—	August 24, 2000	Socorro	LINEAR	·	4.1 km	MPC · JPL
87357	2000 QN_{37}	—	August 24, 2000	Socorro	LINEAR	·	2.7 km	MPC · JPL
87358	2000 QZ_{37}	—	August 24, 2000	Socorro	LINEAR	·	2.5 km	MPC · JPL
87359	2000 QQ_{39}	—	August 24, 2000	Socorro	LINEAR	·	2.2 km	MPC · JPL
87360	2000 QK_{42}	—	August 24, 2000	Socorro	LINEAR	MAR	3.4 km	MPC · JPL
87361	2000 QK_{43}	—	August 24, 2000	Socorro	LINEAR	KOR	2.6 km	MPC · JPL
87362	2000 QS_{45}	—	August 24, 2000	Socorro	LINEAR	(11097)	9.0 km	MPC · JPL
87363	2000 QX_{45}	—	August 24, 2000	Socorro	LINEAR	·	3.1 km	MPC · JPL
87364	2000 QA_{46}	—	August 24, 2000	Socorro	LINEAR	KOR	2.5 km	MPC · JPL
87365	2000 QL_{46}	—	August 24, 2000	Socorro	LINEAR	MAS	1.7 km	MPC · JPL
87366	2000 QA_{47}	—	August 24, 2000	Socorro	LINEAR	·	1.7 km	MPC · JPL
87367	2000 QK_{47}	—	August 24, 2000	Socorro	LINEAR	·	2.1 km	MPC · JPL
87368	2000 QT_{48}	—	August 24, 2000	Socorro	LINEAR	·	3.0 km	MPC · JPL
87369	2000 QB_{49}	—	August 24, 2000	Socorro	LINEAR	(5)	2.3 km	MPC · JPL
87370	2000 QY_{50}	—	August 24, 2000	Socorro	LINEAR	EUN	3.1 km	MPC · JPL
87371	2000 QD_{52}	—	August 24, 2000	Socorro	LINEAR	·	2.0 km	MPC · JPL
87372	2000 QP_{53}	—	August 25, 2000	Socorro	LINEAR	MAS	2.2 km	MPC · JPL
87373	2000 QN_{54}	—	August 25, 2000	Socorro	LINEAR	·	2.1 km	MPC · JPL
87374	2000 QY_{54}	—	August 25, 2000	Socorro	LINEAR	·	4.4 km	MPC · JPL
87375	2000 QN_{55}	—	August 25, 2000	Socorro	LINEAR	CYB	10 km	MPC · JPL
87376	2000 QN_{57}	—	August 26, 2000	Socorro	LINEAR	·	4.0 km	MPC · JPL
87377	2000 QS_{58}	—	August 26, 2000	Socorro	LINEAR	·	2.9 km	MPC · JPL
87378	2000 QQ_{59}	—	August 26, 2000	Socorro	LINEAR	·	2.2 km	MPC · JPL
87379	2000 QU_{59}	—	August 26, 2000	Socorro	LINEAR	·	3.8 km	MPC · JPL
87380	2000 QJ_{60}	—	August 26, 2000	Socorro	LINEAR	·	6.0 km	MPC · JPL
87381	2000 QE_{62}	—	August 28, 2000	Socorro	LINEAR	RAF	1.9 km	MPC · JPL
87382	2000 QF_{62}	—	August 28, 2000	Socorro	LINEAR	·	2.7 km	MPC · JPL
87383	2000 QU_{62}	—	August 28, 2000	Socorro	LINEAR	·	4.1 km	MPC · JPL
87384	2000 QT_{63}	—	August 28, 2000	Socorro	LINEAR	·	3.3 km	MPC · JPL
87385	2000 QV_{63}	—	August 28, 2000	Socorro	LINEAR	·	2.2 km	MPC · JPL
87386	2000 QG_{65}	—	August 28, 2000	Socorro	LINEAR	·	2.7 km	MPC · JPL
87387	2000 QW_{65}	—	August 28, 2000	Socorro	LINEAR	ADE ·	3.0 km	MPC · JPL
87388	2000 QL_{66}	—	August 28, 2000	Socorro	LINEAR	·	6.4 km	MPC · JPL
87389	2000 QT_{66}	—	August 28, 2000	Socorro	LINEAR	·	5.5 km	MPC · JPL
87390	2000 QN_{67}	—	August 28, 2000	Socorro	LINEAR	·	5.7 km	MPC · JPL
87391	2000 QY_{67}	—	August 28, 2000	Socorro	LINEAR	·	4.5 km	MPC · JPL
87392	2000 QB_{69}	—	August 29, 2000	Reedy Creek	J. Broughton	EUN	3.5 km	MPC · JPL
87393	2000 QA_{71}	—	August 27, 2000	Needville	Needville	GEF	2.7 km	MPC · JPL
87394	2000 QF_{72}	—	August 24, 2000	Socorro	LINEAR	·	1.7 km	MPC · JPL
87395	2000 QP_{72}	—	August 24, 2000	Socorro	LINEAR	·	3.3 km	MPC · JPL
87396	2000 QT_{72}	—	August 24, 2000	Socorro	LINEAR	·	2.6 km	MPC · JPL
87397	2000 QB_{73}	—	August 24, 2000	Socorro	LINEAR	·	3.0 km	MPC · JPL
87398	2000 QD_{73}	—	August 24, 2000	Socorro	LINEAR	EUN	2.6 km	MPC · JPL
87399	2000 QR_{73}	—	August 24, 2000	Socorro	LINEAR	·	2.7 km	MPC · JPL
87400	2000 QW_{73}	—	August 24, 2000	Socorro	LINEAR	·	3.9 km	MPC · JPL

== 87401–87500 ==
back to top

Designation			Discovery			Properties		Ref
Permanent	Provisional	Named after	Date	Site	Discoverer(s)	Category	Diam.	Ref
87401	2000 QS_{74}	—	August 24, 2000	Socorro	LINEAR	·	4.0 km	MPC · JPL
87402	2000 QE_{75}	—	August 24, 2000	Socorro	LINEAR	EUN	3.6 km	MPC · JPL
87403	2000 QH_{76}	—	August 24, 2000	Socorro	LINEAR	·	3.1 km	MPC · JPL
87404	2000 QK_{76}	—	August 24, 2000	Socorro	LINEAR	(5)	3.2 km	MPC · JPL
87405	2000 QP_{77}	—	August 24, 2000	Socorro	LINEAR	·	2.5 km	MPC · JPL
87406	2000 QC_{83}	—	August 24, 2000	Socorro	LINEAR	·	3.4 km	MPC · JPL
87407	2000 QJ_{83}	—	August 24, 2000	Socorro	LINEAR	·	3.0 km	MPC · JPL
87408	2000 QN_{83}	—	August 24, 2000	Socorro	LINEAR	·	2.9 km	MPC · JPL
87409	2000 QU_{85}	—	August 25, 2000	Socorro	LINEAR	HYG	4.8 km	MPC · JPL
87410	2000 QY_{86}	—	August 25, 2000	Socorro	LINEAR	·	2.4 km	MPC · JPL
87411	2000 QC_{88}	—	August 25, 2000	Socorro	LINEAR	EUN	3.6 km	MPC · JPL
87412	2000 QE_{88}	—	August 25, 2000	Socorro	LINEAR	EUN · slow	3.2 km	MPC · JPL
87413	2000 QU_{89}	—	August 25, 2000	Socorro	LINEAR	·	3.4 km	MPC · JPL
87414	2000 QB_{90}	—	August 25, 2000	Socorro	LINEAR	·	2.5 km	MPC · JPL
87415	2000 QA_{92}	—	August 25, 2000	Socorro	LINEAR	·	2.1 km	MPC · JPL
87416	2000 QM_{92}	—	August 25, 2000	Socorro	LINEAR	(5)	2.5 km	MPC · JPL
87417	2000 QM_{93}	—	August 26, 2000	Socorro	LINEAR	·	2.3 km	MPC · JPL
87418	2000 QZ_{94}	—	August 26, 2000	Socorro	LINEAR	·	2.9 km	MPC · JPL
87419	2000 QM_{95}	—	August 26, 2000	Socorro	LINEAR	·	9.1 km	MPC · JPL
87420	2000 QN_{95}	—	August 26, 2000	Socorro	LINEAR	·	2.7 km	MPC · JPL
87421	2000 QS_{97}	—	August 28, 2000	Socorro	LINEAR	·	2.5 km	MPC · JPL
87422	2000 QE_{99}	—	August 28, 2000	Socorro	LINEAR	·	2.0 km	MPC · JPL
87423	2000 QW_{99}	—	August 28, 2000	Socorro	LINEAR	LEO	4.1 km	MPC · JPL
87424	2000 QY_{99}	—	August 28, 2000	Socorro	LINEAR	(5)	2.6 km	MPC · JPL
87425	2000 QJ_{100}	—	August 28, 2000	Socorro	LINEAR	RAF	1.9 km	MPC · JPL
87426	2000 QH_{101}	—	August 28, 2000	Socorro	LINEAR	(5)	3.6 km	MPC · JPL
87427	2000 QE_{102}	—	August 28, 2000	Socorro	LINEAR	·	3.2 km	MPC · JPL
87428	2000 QY_{102}	—	August 28, 2000	Socorro	LINEAR	·	7.2 km	MPC · JPL
87429	2000 QM_{103}	—	August 28, 2000	Socorro	LINEAR	·	3.6 km	MPC · JPL
87430	2000 QG_{104}	—	August 28, 2000	Socorro	LINEAR	·	2.5 km	MPC · JPL
87431	2000 QE_{105}	—	August 28, 2000	Socorro	LINEAR	EOS	5.0 km	MPC · JPL
87432	2000 QG_{105}	—	August 28, 2000	Socorro	LINEAR	·	3.4 km	MPC · JPL
87433	2000 QM_{105}	—	August 28, 2000	Socorro	LINEAR	·	3.4 km	MPC · JPL
87434	2000 QX_{105}	—	August 28, 2000	Socorro	LINEAR	·	8.2 km	MPC · JPL
87435	2000 QH_{106}	—	August 29, 2000	Socorro	LINEAR	·	3.1 km	MPC · JPL
87436	2000 QO_{106}	—	August 29, 2000	Socorro	LINEAR	KOR	2.7 km	MPC · JPL
87437	2000 QC_{107}	—	August 29, 2000	Socorro	LINEAR	·	7.5 km	MPC · JPL
87438	2000 QH_{107}	—	August 29, 2000	Socorro	LINEAR	·	1.7 km	MPC · JPL
87439	2000 QZ_{108}	—	August 29, 2000	Socorro	LINEAR	HYG	5.4 km	MPC · JPL
87440	2000 QA_{110}	—	August 24, 2000	Socorro	LINEAR	·	2.9 km	MPC · JPL
87441	2000 QE_{110}	—	August 24, 2000	Socorro	LINEAR	EUN	4.7 km	MPC · JPL
87442	2000 QZ_{110}	—	August 24, 2000	Socorro	LINEAR	·	4.9 km	MPC · JPL
87443	2000 QL_{111}	—	August 24, 2000	Socorro	LINEAR	·	4.2 km	MPC · JPL
87444	2000 QZ_{111}	—	August 24, 2000	Socorro	LINEAR	·	2.4 km	MPC · JPL
87445	2000 QM_{113}	—	August 24, 2000	Socorro	LINEAR	·	2.3 km	MPC · JPL
87446	2000 QO_{113}	—	August 24, 2000	Socorro	LINEAR	·	4.4 km	MPC · JPL
87447	2000 QR_{116}	—	August 28, 2000	Socorro	LINEAR	·	3.1 km	MPC · JPL
87448	2000 QA_{118}	—	August 25, 2000	Socorro	LINEAR	MAR	3.1 km	MPC · JPL
87449	2000 QF_{119}	—	August 25, 2000	Socorro	LINEAR	·	6.1 km	MPC · JPL
87450	2000 QB_{120}	—	August 25, 2000	Socorro	LINEAR	·	4.3 km	MPC · JPL
87451	2000 QD_{120}	—	August 25, 2000	Socorro	LINEAR	·	3.0 km	MPC · JPL
87452	2000 QD_{121}	—	August 25, 2000	Socorro	LINEAR	WIT	2.4 km	MPC · JPL
87453	2000 QE_{121}	—	August 25, 2000	Socorro	LINEAR	·	3.0 km	MPC · JPL
87454	2000 QG_{121}	—	August 25, 2000	Socorro	LINEAR	·	8.0 km	MPC · JPL
87455	2000 QK_{122}	—	August 25, 2000	Socorro	LINEAR	·	8.2 km	MPC · JPL
87456	2000 QM_{122}	—	August 25, 2000	Socorro	LINEAR	·	2.3 km	MPC · JPL
87457	2000 QR_{123}	—	August 25, 2000	Socorro	LINEAR	·	3.2 km	MPC · JPL
87458	2000 QK_{124}	—	August 28, 2000	Socorro	LINEAR	·	3.4 km	MPC · JPL
87459	2000 QL_{125}	—	August 31, 2000	Socorro	LINEAR	·	2.8 km	MPC · JPL
87460	2000 QR_{126}	—	August 31, 2000	Socorro	LINEAR	·	2.6 km	MPC · JPL
87461	2000 QD_{127}	—	August 24, 2000	Socorro	LINEAR	·	3.2 km	MPC · JPL
87462	2000 QS_{127}	—	August 24, 2000	Socorro	LINEAR	EUN	3.0 km	MPC · JPL
87463	2000 QT_{128}	—	August 25, 2000	Socorro	LINEAR	·	3.1 km	MPC · JPL
87464	2000 QV_{129}	—	August 31, 2000	Reedy Creek	J. Broughton	·	3.3 km	MPC · JPL
87465	2000 QU_{130}	—	August 24, 2000	Socorro	LINEAR	(5)	2.5 km	MPC · JPL
87466	2000 QX_{130}	—	August 24, 2000	Socorro	LINEAR	·	5.1 km	MPC · JPL
87467	2000 QC_{131}	—	August 24, 2000	Socorro	LINEAR	V	1.6 km	MPC · JPL
87468	2000 QF_{131}	—	August 24, 2000	Socorro	LINEAR	·	3.0 km	MPC · JPL
87469	2000 QT_{131}	—	August 25, 2000	Socorro	LINEAR	(5)	2.8 km	MPC · JPL
87470	2000 QM_{133}	—	August 26, 2000	Socorro	LINEAR	HNS	3.3 km	MPC · JPL
87471	2000 QL_{134}	—	August 26, 2000	Socorro	LINEAR	(5)	2.6 km	MPC · JPL
87472	2000 QU_{135}	—	August 26, 2000	Socorro	LINEAR	·	2.8 km	MPC · JPL
87473	2000 QK_{137}	—	August 31, 2000	Socorro	LINEAR	·	3.0 km	MPC · JPL
87474	2000 QF_{139}	—	August 31, 2000	Socorro	LINEAR	·	2.7 km	MPC · JPL
87475	2000 QM_{139}	—	August 31, 2000	Socorro	LINEAR	·	3.7 km	MPC · JPL
87476	2000 QH_{140}	—	August 31, 2000	Socorro	LINEAR	·	2.5 km	MPC · JPL
87477	2000 QN_{140}	—	August 31, 2000	Socorro	LINEAR	·	2.9 km	MPC · JPL
87478	2000 QM_{141}	—	August 31, 2000	Socorro	LINEAR	EOS	3.9 km	MPC · JPL
87479	2000 QB_{143}	—	August 31, 2000	Socorro	LINEAR	·	5.9 km	MPC · JPL
87480	2000 QZ_{143}	—	August 31, 2000	Socorro	LINEAR	·	1.9 km	MPC · JPL
87481	2000 QC_{144}	—	August 31, 2000	Socorro	LINEAR	·	2.3 km	MPC · JPL
87482	2000 QJ_{146}	—	August 31, 2000	Socorro	LINEAR	·	4.9 km	MPC · JPL
87483	2000 QN_{149}	—	August 24, 2000	Socorro	LINEAR	GEF	4.2 km	MPC · JPL
87484	2000 QD_{150}	—	August 25, 2000	Socorro	LINEAR	·	3.0 km	MPC · JPL
87485	2000 QT_{150}	—	August 25, 2000	Socorro	LINEAR	·	6.8 km	MPC · JPL
87486	2000 QQ_{153}	—	August 29, 2000	Socorro	LINEAR	EUN	2.6 km	MPC · JPL
87487	2000 QY_{153}	—	August 31, 2000	Socorro	LINEAR	ADE	4.5 km	MPC · JPL
87488	2000 QG_{154}	—	August 31, 2000	Socorro	LINEAR	·	5.3 km	MPC · JPL
87489	2000 QJ_{156}	—	August 31, 2000	Socorro	LINEAR	GEF	3.1 km	MPC · JPL
87490	2000 QN_{156}	—	August 31, 2000	Socorro	LINEAR	·	4.3 km	MPC · JPL
87491	2000 QE_{157}	—	August 31, 2000	Socorro	LINEAR	·	4.3 km	MPC · JPL
87492	2000 QP_{158}	—	August 31, 2000	Socorro	LINEAR	DOR	6.0 km	MPC · JPL
87493	2000 QM_{159}	—	August 31, 2000	Socorro	LINEAR	·	3.7 km	MPC · JPL
87494	2000 QC_{161}	—	August 31, 2000	Socorro	LINEAR	EOS	4.4 km	MPC · JPL
87495	2000 QH_{162}	—	August 31, 2000	Socorro	LINEAR	·	4.0 km	MPC · JPL
87496	2000 QJ_{162}	—	August 31, 2000	Socorro	LINEAR	·	2.7 km	MPC · JPL
87497	2000 QX_{165}	—	August 31, 2000	Socorro	LINEAR	·	3.9 km	MPC · JPL
87498	2000 QX_{166}	—	August 31, 2000	Socorro	LINEAR	·	3.3 km	MPC · JPL
87499	2000 QE_{167}	—	August 31, 2000	Socorro	LINEAR	·	2.6 km	MPC · JPL
87500	2000 QS_{167}	—	August 31, 2000	Socorro	LINEAR	·	2.4 km	MPC · JPL

== 87501–87600 ==
back to top

Designation			Discovery			Properties		Ref
Permanent	Provisional	Named after	Date	Site	Discoverer(s)	Category	Diam.	Ref
87501	2000 QD_{169}	—	August 31, 2000	Socorro	LINEAR	·	3.2 km	MPC · JPL
87502	2000 QC_{173}	—	August 31, 2000	Socorro	LINEAR	·	4.7 km	MPC · JPL
87503	2000 QH_{173}	—	August 31, 2000	Socorro	LINEAR	·	2.8 km	MPC · JPL
87504	2000 QB_{174}	—	August 31, 2000	Socorro	LINEAR	·	3.4 km	MPC · JPL
87505	2000 QD_{174}	—	August 31, 2000	Socorro	LINEAR	·	2.2 km	MPC · JPL
87506	2000 QG_{174}	—	August 31, 2000	Socorro	LINEAR	·	5.8 km	MPC · JPL
87507	2000 QY_{175}	—	August 31, 2000	Socorro	LINEAR	·	2.9 km	MPC · JPL
87508	2000 QE_{176}	—	August 31, 2000	Socorro	LINEAR	PAD	3.5 km	MPC · JPL
87509	2000 QT_{181}	—	August 31, 2000	Socorro	LINEAR	·	3.0 km	MPC · JPL
87510	2000 QJ_{183}	—	August 24, 2000	Socorro	LINEAR	·	6.1 km	MPC · JPL
87511	2000 QA_{184}	—	August 26, 2000	Socorro	LINEAR	·	2.2 km	MPC · JPL
87512	2000 QZ_{184}	—	August 26, 2000	Socorro	LINEAR	·	2.5 km	MPC · JPL
87513	2000 QD_{188}	—	August 26, 2000	Socorro	LINEAR	(5)	3.2 km	MPC · JPL
87514	2000 QB_{190}	—	August 26, 2000	Socorro	LINEAR	ADE	5.9 km	MPC · JPL
87515	2000 QG_{190}	—	August 26, 2000	Socorro	LINEAR	·	1.9 km	MPC · JPL
87516	2000 QU_{190}	—	August 26, 2000	Socorro	LINEAR	·	4.4 km	MPC · JPL
87517	2000 QB_{191}	—	August 26, 2000	Socorro	LINEAR	·	3.0 km	MPC · JPL
87518	2000 QM_{191}	—	August 26, 2000	Socorro	LINEAR	EOS	4.7 km	MPC · JPL
87519	2000 QO_{191}	—	August 26, 2000	Socorro	LINEAR	·	2.8 km	MPC · JPL
87520	2000 QL_{192}	—	August 26, 2000	Socorro	LINEAR	·	2.4 km	MPC · JPL
87521	2000 QM_{192}	—	August 26, 2000	Socorro	LINEAR	·	2.5 km	MPC · JPL
87522	2000 QK_{193}	—	August 29, 2000	Socorro	LINEAR	·	4.8 km	MPC · JPL
87523	2000 QS_{193}	—	August 29, 2000	Socorro	LINEAR	·	2.2 km	MPC · JPL
87524	2000 QQ_{197}	—	August 29, 2000	Socorro	LINEAR	EUN	2.3 km	MPC · JPL
87525	2000 QV_{197}	—	August 29, 2000	Socorro	LINEAR	·	5.0 km	MPC · JPL
87526	2000 QK_{198}	—	August 29, 2000	Socorro	LINEAR	·	4.0 km	MPC · JPL
87527	2000 QO_{198}	—	August 29, 2000	Socorro	LINEAR	·	3.1 km	MPC · JPL
87528	2000 QP_{198}	—	August 29, 2000	Socorro	LINEAR	·	3.3 km	MPC · JPL
87529	2000 QZ_{199}	—	August 29, 2000	Socorro	LINEAR	(5)	2.9 km	MPC · JPL
87530	2000 QG_{200}	—	August 29, 2000	Socorro	LINEAR	·	2.5 km	MPC · JPL
87531	2000 QJ_{200}	—	August 29, 2000	Socorro	LINEAR	MAR	1.8 km	MPC · JPL
87532	2000 QX_{201}	—	August 29, 2000	Socorro	LINEAR	HYG	6.6 km	MPC · JPL
87533	2000 QG_{203}	—	August 29, 2000	Socorro	LINEAR	·	1.6 km	MPC · JPL
87534	2000 QR_{203}	—	August 29, 2000	Socorro	LINEAR	EUN	2.9 km	MPC · JPL
87535	2000 QY_{203}	—	August 29, 2000	Socorro	LINEAR	·	3.1 km	MPC · JPL
87536	2000 QZ_{203}	—	August 29, 2000	Socorro	LINEAR	·	4.6 km	MPC · JPL
87537	2000 QX_{205}	—	August 31, 2000	Socorro	LINEAR	(5)	2.3 km	MPC · JPL
87538	2000 QA_{206}	—	August 31, 2000	Socorro	LINEAR	·	7.5 km	MPC · JPL
87539	2000 QY_{206}	—	August 31, 2000	Socorro	LINEAR	·	4.5 km	MPC · JPL
87540	2000 QB_{207}	—	August 31, 2000	Socorro	LINEAR	·	2.8 km	MPC · JPL
87541	2000 QG_{208}	—	August 31, 2000	Socorro	LINEAR	·	2.7 km	MPC · JPL
87542	2000 QA_{214}	—	August 31, 2000	Socorro	LINEAR	·	6.0 km	MPC · JPL
87543	2000 QA_{215}	—	August 31, 2000	Socorro	LINEAR	·	2.6 km	MPC · JPL
87544	2000 QL_{217}	—	August 31, 2000	Socorro	LINEAR	·	8.6 km	MPC · JPL
87545	2000 QB_{218}	—	August 31, 2000	Socorro	LINEAR	EOS	5.4 km	MPC · JPL
87546	2000 QE_{218}	—	August 31, 2000	Socorro	LINEAR	EOS	4.7 km	MPC · JPL
87547	2000 QZ_{219}	—	August 21, 2000	Anderson Mesa	LONEOS	·	3.5 km	MPC · JPL
87548	2000 QC_{222}	—	August 21, 2000	Anderson Mesa	LONEOS	·	2.6 km	MPC · JPL
87549	2000 QW_{222}	—	August 21, 2000	Anderson Mesa	LONEOS	·	3.3 km	MPC · JPL
87550	2000 QU_{224}	—	August 26, 2000	Haleakala	NEAT	EOS	5.0 km	MPC · JPL
87551	2000 QC_{227}	—	August 31, 2000	Socorro	LINEAR	·	5.7 km	MPC · JPL
87552	2000 QV_{227}	—	August 31, 2000	Socorro	LINEAR	·	2.6 km	MPC · JPL
87553	2000 QO_{229}	—	August 31, 2000	Socorro	LINEAR	·	3.4 km	MPC · JPL
87554	2000 QM_{231}	—	August 29, 2000	Socorro	LINEAR	·	5.7 km	MPC · JPL
87555	2000 QB_{243}	—	August 25, 2000	Cerro Tololo	Deep Ecliptic Survey	centaur	92 km	MPC · JPL
87556	2000 RL_{1}	—	September 1, 2000	Socorro	LINEAR	·	5.3 km	MPC · JPL
87557	2000 RX_{1}	—	September 1, 2000	Socorro	LINEAR	·	2.9 km	MPC · JPL
87558	2000 RL_{3}	—	September 1, 2000	Socorro	LINEAR	·	4.2 km	MPC · JPL
87559	2000 RC_{4}	—	September 1, 2000	Socorro	LINEAR	·	3.3 km	MPC · JPL
87560	2000 RE_{4}	—	September 1, 2000	Socorro	LINEAR	(5)	2.5 km	MPC · JPL
87561	2000 RM_{4}	—	September 1, 2000	Socorro	LINEAR	·	3.7 km	MPC · JPL
87562	2000 RZ_{5}	—	September 1, 2000	Socorro	LINEAR	·	3.8 km	MPC · JPL
87563	2000 RP_{6}	—	September 1, 2000	Socorro	LINEAR	·	2.2 km	MPC · JPL
87564	2000 RQ_{9}	—	September 1, 2000	Socorro	LINEAR	·	2.3 km	MPC · JPL
87565	2000 RE_{10}	—	September 1, 2000	Socorro	LINEAR	·	5.7 km	MPC · JPL
87566	2000 RO_{10}	—	September 1, 2000	Socorro	LINEAR	·	5.1 km	MPC · JPL
87567	2000 RC_{11}	—	September 1, 2000	Socorro	LINEAR	·	3.1 km	MPC · JPL
87568	2000 RW_{11}	—	September 3, 2000	Socorro	LINEAR	·	3.8 km	MPC · JPL
87569	2000 RS_{12}	—	September 1, 2000	Socorro	LINEAR	·	3.9 km	MPC · JPL
87570	2000 RB_{13}	—	September 1, 2000	Socorro	LINEAR	·	2.7 km	MPC · JPL
87571	2000 RS_{13}	—	September 1, 2000	Socorro	LINEAR	·	3.7 km	MPC · JPL
87572	2000 RF_{14}	—	September 1, 2000	Socorro	LINEAR	EUN	2.5 km	MPC · JPL
87573	2000 RH_{14}	—	September 1, 2000	Socorro	LINEAR	EOS	4.5 km	MPC · JPL
87574	2000 RK_{14}	—	September 1, 2000	Socorro	LINEAR	DOR	4.5 km	MPC · JPL
87575	2000 RN_{14}	—	September 1, 2000	Socorro	LINEAR	EOS	4.7 km	MPC · JPL
87576	2000 RY_{14}	—	September 1, 2000	Socorro	LINEAR	EOS	4.8 km	MPC · JPL
87577	2000 RH_{15}	—	September 1, 2000	Socorro	LINEAR	·	2.5 km	MPC · JPL
87578	2000 RU_{15}	—	September 1, 2000	Socorro	LINEAR	EOS	4.3 km	MPC · JPL
87579	2000 RX_{15}	—	September 1, 2000	Socorro	LINEAR	ADE	4.7 km	MPC · JPL
87580	2000 RE_{16}	—	September 1, 2000	Socorro	LINEAR	MAR · slow	3.2 km	MPC · JPL
87581	2000 RX_{18}	—	September 1, 2000	Socorro	LINEAR	·	3.2 km	MPC · JPL
87582	2000 RP_{19}	—	September 1, 2000	Socorro	LINEAR	·	3.6 km	MPC · JPL
87583	2000 RD_{20}	—	September 1, 2000	Socorro	LINEAR	·	3.0 km	MPC · JPL
87584	2000 RE_{21}	—	September 1, 2000	Socorro	LINEAR	EUN	2.5 km	MPC · JPL
87585	2000 RV_{21}	—	September 1, 2000	Socorro	LINEAR	·	3.8 km	MPC · JPL
87586	2000 RJ_{22}	—	September 1, 2000	Socorro	LINEAR	·	2.7 km	MPC · JPL
87587	2000 RL_{22}	—	September 1, 2000	Socorro	LINEAR	·	2.4 km	MPC · JPL
87588	2000 RY_{22}	—	September 1, 2000	Socorro	LINEAR	·	2.9 km	MPC · JPL
87589	2000 RN_{23}	—	September 1, 2000	Socorro	LINEAR	·	2.8 km	MPC · JPL
87590	2000 RO_{24}	—	September 1, 2000	Socorro	LINEAR	·	5.6 km	MPC · JPL
87591	2000 RX_{26}	—	September 1, 2000	Socorro	LINEAR	·	2.7 km	MPC · JPL
87592	2000 RD_{28}	—	September 1, 2000	Socorro	LINEAR	EOS	4.7 km	MPC · JPL
87593	2000 RE_{28}	—	September 1, 2000	Socorro	LINEAR	·	2.2 km	MPC · JPL
87594	2000 RL_{29}	—	September 1, 2000	Socorro	LINEAR	·	3.5 km	MPC · JPL
87595	2000 RM_{30}	—	September 1, 2000	Socorro	LINEAR	·	4.5 km	MPC · JPL
87596	2000 RG_{31}	—	September 1, 2000	Socorro	LINEAR	EOS	5.4 km	MPC · JPL
87597	2000 RU_{32}	—	September 1, 2000	Socorro	LINEAR	PAD	4.3 km	MPC · JPL
87598	2000 RY_{32}	—	September 1, 2000	Socorro	LINEAR	MRX	2.6 km	MPC · JPL
87599	2000 RM_{33}	—	September 1, 2000	Socorro	LINEAR	·	7.1 km	MPC · JPL
87600	2000 RF_{34}	—	September 1, 2000	Socorro	LINEAR	·	4.4 km	MPC · JPL

== 87601–87700 ==
back to top

Designation			Discovery			Properties		Ref
Permanent	Provisional	Named after	Date	Site	Discoverer(s)	Category	Diam.	Ref
87601	2000 RP_{37}	—	September 3, 2000	Socorro	LINEAR	·	3.3 km	MPC · JPL
87602	2000 RS_{38}	—	September 3, 2000	Socorro	LINEAR	·	7.0 km	MPC · JPL
87603	2000 RD_{40}	—	September 3, 2000	Socorro	LINEAR	·	3.5 km	MPC · JPL
87604	2000 RF_{40}	—	September 3, 2000	Socorro	LINEAR	·	3.4 km	MPC · JPL
87605	2000 RW_{41}	—	September 3, 2000	Socorro	LINEAR	EOS	4.9 km	MPC · JPL
87606	2000 RZ_{43}	—	September 3, 2000	Socorro	LINEAR	·	2.2 km	MPC · JPL
87607	2000 RA_{44}	—	September 3, 2000	Socorro	LINEAR	·	3.6 km	MPC · JPL
87608	2000 RC_{44}	—	September 3, 2000	Socorro	LINEAR	·	6.1 km	MPC · JPL
87609	2000 RL_{44}	—	September 3, 2000	Socorro	LINEAR	V	1.7 km	MPC · JPL
87610	2000 RO_{44}	—	September 3, 2000	Socorro	LINEAR	·	4.2 km	MPC · JPL
87611	2000 RP_{44}	—	September 3, 2000	Socorro	LINEAR	·	3.9 km	MPC · JPL
87612	2000 RN_{45}	—	September 3, 2000	Socorro	LINEAR	·	3.1 km	MPC · JPL
87613	2000 RQ_{45}	—	September 3, 2000	Socorro	LINEAR	BRU	5.9 km	MPC · JPL
87614	2000 RX_{45}	—	September 3, 2000	Socorro	LINEAR	MAR	2.8 km	MPC · JPL
87615	2000 RB_{47}	—	September 3, 2000	Socorro	LINEAR	MAR	2.6 km	MPC · JPL
87616	2000 RR_{47}	—	September 3, 2000	Socorro	LINEAR	·	4.8 km	MPC · JPL
87617	2000 RB_{48}	—	September 3, 2000	Socorro	LINEAR	GEF	4.4 km	MPC · JPL
87618	2000 RH_{48}	—	September 3, 2000	Socorro	LINEAR	·	3.8 km	MPC · JPL
87619	2000 RM_{48}	—	September 3, 2000	Socorro	LINEAR	JUN	3.6 km	MPC · JPL
87620	2000 RO_{48}	—	September 3, 2000	Socorro	LINEAR	·	3.2 km	MPC · JPL
87621	2000 RW_{48}	—	September 3, 2000	Socorro	LINEAR	·	4.8 km	MPC · JPL
87622	2000 RE_{49}	—	September 5, 2000	Socorro	LINEAR	·	5.4 km	MPC · JPL
87623	2000 RH_{49}	—	September 5, 2000	Socorro	LINEAR	·	6.0 km	MPC · JPL
87624	2000 RR_{51}	—	September 5, 2000	Socorro	LINEAR	·	4.7 km	MPC · JPL
87625	2000 RS_{51}	—	September 5, 2000	Socorro	LINEAR	MAR	3.9 km	MPC · JPL
87626	2000 RB_{52}	—	September 5, 2000	Socorro	LINEAR	·	3.1 km	MPC · JPL
87627	2000 RH_{52}	—	September 6, 2000	Bisei SG Center	BATTeRS	·	7.5 km	MPC · JPL
87628	2000 RP_{54}	—	September 3, 2000	Socorro	LINEAR	MAR	3.0 km	MPC · JPL
87629	2000 RX_{54}	—	September 3, 2000	Socorro	LINEAR	TIN	2.2 km	MPC · JPL
87630	2000 RE_{55}	—	September 3, 2000	Socorro	LINEAR	·	3.4 km	MPC · JPL
87631	2000 RB_{61}	—	September 1, 2000	Socorro	LINEAR	·	7.4 km	MPC · JPL
87632	2000 RF_{64}	—	September 1, 2000	Socorro	LINEAR	·	3.9 km	MPC · JPL
87633	2000 RM_{64}	—	September 1, 2000	Socorro	LINEAR	·	4.2 km	MPC · JPL
87634	2000 RR_{64}	—	September 1, 2000	Socorro	LINEAR	·	4.0 km	MPC · JPL
87635	2000 RW_{66}	—	September 1, 2000	Socorro	LINEAR	·	4.7 km	MPC · JPL
87636	2000 RX_{66}	—	September 1, 2000	Socorro	LINEAR	·	7.2 km	MPC · JPL
87637	2000 RD_{67}	—	September 1, 2000	Socorro	LINEAR	·	2.9 km	MPC · JPL
87638	2000 RG_{67}	—	September 1, 2000	Socorro	LINEAR	·	6.7 km	MPC · JPL
87639	2000 RZ_{67}	—	September 2, 2000	Socorro	LINEAR	PHO	3.0 km	MPC · JPL
87640	2000 RU_{70}	—	September 2, 2000	Socorro	LINEAR	·	2.6 km	MPC · JPL
87641	2000 RC_{73}	—	September 2, 2000	Socorro	LINEAR	PHO	2.1 km	MPC · JPL
87642	2000 RF_{73}	—	September 2, 2000	Socorro	LINEAR	MAS	2.4 km	MPC · JPL
87643	2000 RD_{76}	—	September 3, 2000	Socorro	LINEAR	GEF	3.5 km	MPC · JPL
87644 Cathomen	2000 RJ_{77}	Cathomen	September 8, 2000	Gnosca	S. Sposetti	ADE	4.8 km	MPC · JPL
87645	2000 RK_{77}	—	September 9, 2000	Gnosca	S. Sposetti	(5)	2.8 km	MPC · JPL
87646	2000 RB_{78}	—	September 8, 2000	Črni Vrh	Mikuž, H.	·	6.6 km	MPC · JPL
87647	2000 RR_{79}	—	September 1, 2000	Socorro	LINEAR	HNS	3.1 km	MPC · JPL
87648	2000 RB_{80}	—	September 1, 2000	Socorro	LINEAR	·	5.2 km	MPC · JPL
87649	2000 RE_{80}	—	September 1, 2000	Socorro	LINEAR	·	5.2 km	MPC · JPL
87650	2000 RB_{82}	—	September 1, 2000	Socorro	LINEAR	·	6.4 km	MPC · JPL
87651	2000 RT_{82}	—	September 1, 2000	Socorro	LINEAR	EUN	4.3 km	MPC · JPL
87652	2000 RK_{86}	—	September 2, 2000	Socorro	LINEAR	·	5.0 km	MPC · JPL
87653	2000 RQ_{86}	—	September 2, 2000	Anderson Mesa	LONEOS	·	3.1 km	MPC · JPL
87654	2000 RE_{88}	—	September 3, 2000	Socorro	LINEAR	EOS	3.4 km	MPC · JPL
87655	2000 RW_{88}	—	September 3, 2000	Socorro	LINEAR	·	4.0 km	MPC · JPL
87656	2000 RO_{90}	—	September 3, 2000	Socorro	LINEAR	·	6.1 km	MPC · JPL
87657	2000 RC_{93}	—	September 3, 2000	Kitt Peak	Spacewatch	MRX	2.0 km	MPC · JPL
87658	2000 RE_{93}	—	September 3, 2000	Socorro	LINEAR	·	5.2 km	MPC · JPL
87659	2000 RD_{94}	—	September 4, 2000	Anderson Mesa	LONEOS	·	5.3 km	MPC · JPL
87660	2000 RS_{94}	—	September 4, 2000	Anderson Mesa	LONEOS	·	5.5 km	MPC · JPL
87661	2000 RU_{95}	—	September 4, 2000	Anderson Mesa	LONEOS	WIT	2.5 km	MPC · JPL
87662	2000 RO_{96}	—	September 4, 2000	Haleakala	NEAT	·	3.4 km	MPC · JPL
87663	2000 RG_{97}	—	September 5, 2000	Anderson Mesa	LONEOS	·	5.1 km	MPC · JPL
87664	2000 RN_{97}	—	September 5, 2000	Anderson Mesa	LONEOS	·	6.6 km	MPC · JPL
87665	2000 RV_{97}	—	September 5, 2000	Anderson Mesa	LONEOS	EUN	3.6 km	MPC · JPL
87666	2000 RN_{98}	—	September 5, 2000	Anderson Mesa	LONEOS	·	2.6 km	MPC · JPL
87667	2000 RP_{98}	—	September 5, 2000	Anderson Mesa	LONEOS	·	3.0 km	MPC · JPL
87668	2000 RT_{98}	—	September 5, 2000	Anderson Mesa	LONEOS	EUN	2.9 km	MPC · JPL
87669	2000 RE_{99}	—	September 5, 2000	Anderson Mesa	LONEOS	EUN	3.1 km	MPC · JPL
87670	2000 RH_{99}	—	September 5, 2000	Anderson Mesa	LONEOS	ADE	3.9 km	MPC · JPL
87671	2000 RY_{99}	—	September 5, 2000	Anderson Mesa	LONEOS	EUN	3.7 km	MPC · JPL
87672	2000 RN_{100}	—	September 5, 2000	Anderson Mesa	LONEOS	AEG	7.8 km	MPC · JPL
87673	2000 RZ_{100}	—	September 5, 2000	Anderson Mesa	LONEOS	·	2.9 km	MPC · JPL
87674	2000 RF_{101}	—	September 5, 2000	Anderson Mesa	LONEOS	·	2.8 km	MPC · JPL
87675	2000 RH_{101}	—	September 5, 2000	Anderson Mesa	LONEOS	·	3.8 km	MPC · JPL
87676	2000 RR_{101}	—	September 5, 2000	Anderson Mesa	LONEOS	·	3.6 km	MPC · JPL
87677	2000 RT_{102}	—	September 5, 2000	Anderson Mesa	LONEOS	·	3.9 km	MPC · JPL
87678	2000 RU_{103}	—	September 6, 2000	Socorro	LINEAR	EUN	3.0 km	MPC · JPL
87679	2000 RY_{104}	—	September 6, 2000	Socorro	LINEAR	·	3.1 km	MPC · JPL
87680	2000 RJ_{105}	—	September 7, 2000	Socorro	LINEAR	·	4.1 km	MPC · JPL
87681	2000 RL_{105}	—	September 7, 2000	Socorro	LINEAR	JUN	2.1 km	MPC · JPL
87682	2000 SX_{1}	—	September 20, 2000	Socorro	LINEAR	·	2.4 km	MPC · JPL
87683	2000 SR_{2}	—	September 19, 2000	Haleakala	NEAT	(5)	2.9 km	MPC · JPL
87684	2000 SY_{2}	—	September 20, 2000	Socorro	LINEAR	ATE +1km · PHA	2.3 km	MPC · JPL
87685	2000 SR_{3}	—	September 20, 2000	Socorro	LINEAR	·	7.7 km	MPC · JPL
87686	2000 SW_{6}	—	September 22, 2000	Socorro	LINEAR	EUN	2.3 km	MPC · JPL
87687	2000 SL_{12}	—	September 20, 2000	Socorro	LINEAR	·	3.2 km	MPC · JPL
87688	2000 SP_{12}	—	September 20, 2000	Socorro	LINEAR	·	4.2 km	MPC · JPL
87689	2000 SB_{13}	—	September 21, 2000	Socorro	LINEAR	(5)	3.1 km	MPC · JPL
87690	2000 SG_{13}	—	September 21, 2000	Socorro	LINEAR	·	3.6 km	MPC · JPL
87691	2000 SH_{13}	—	September 21, 2000	Socorro	LINEAR	·	2.8 km	MPC · JPL
87692	2000 SS_{13}	—	September 21, 2000	Socorro	LINEAR	·	4.7 km	MPC · JPL
87693	2000 SV_{13}	—	September 21, 2000	Socorro	LINEAR	·	2.5 km	MPC · JPL
87694	2000 SX_{13}	—	September 22, 2000	Socorro	LINEAR	·	3.2 km	MPC · JPL
87695	2000 SM_{14}	—	September 23, 2000	Socorro	LINEAR	·	9.4 km	MPC · JPL
87696	2000 SQ_{14}	—	September 23, 2000	Socorro	LINEAR	ADE	5.9 km	MPC · JPL
87697	2000 SA_{15}	—	September 23, 2000	Socorro	LINEAR	·	7.5 km	MPC · JPL
87698	2000 SK_{15}	—	September 23, 2000	Socorro	LINEAR	·	2.6 km	MPC · JPL
87699	2000 SP_{17}	—	September 23, 2000	Socorro	LINEAR	·	4.5 km	MPC · JPL
87700	2000 SE_{18}	—	September 23, 2000	Socorro	LINEAR	·	2.3 km	MPC · JPL

== 87701–87800 ==
back to top

Designation			Discovery			Properties		Ref
Permanent	Provisional	Named after	Date	Site	Discoverer(s)	Category	Diam.	Ref
87701	2000 SK_{19}	—	September 23, 2000	Socorro	LINEAR	·	5.6 km	MPC · JPL
87702	2000 SO_{22}	—	September 20, 2000	Haleakala	NEAT	EUN	2.8 km	MPC · JPL
87703	2000 SE_{23}	—	September 25, 2000	Višnjan Observatory	K. Korlević	THM	6.4 km	MPC · JPL
87704	2000 SG_{23}	—	September 26, 2000	Višnjan Observatory	K. Korlević	T_{j} (2.99) · 3:2	8.9 km	MPC · JPL
87705	2000 SY_{24}	—	September 26, 2000	Bisei SG Center	BATTeRS	·	4.9 km	MPC · JPL
87706	2000 SM_{25}	—	September 23, 2000	Socorro	LINEAR	·	4.4 km	MPC · JPL
87707	2000 SS_{25}	—	September 23, 2000	Socorro	LINEAR	·	4.1 km	MPC · JPL
87708	2000 SM_{27}	—	September 23, 2000	Socorro	LINEAR	·	6.3 km	MPC · JPL
87709	2000 SH_{28}	—	September 23, 2000	Socorro	LINEAR	·	3.7 km	MPC · JPL
87710	2000 SY_{28}	—	September 23, 2000	Socorro	LINEAR	·	3.4 km	MPC · JPL
87711	2000 SE_{33}	—	September 24, 2000	Socorro	LINEAR	·	3.3 km	MPC · JPL
87712	2000 SA_{34}	—	September 24, 2000	Socorro	LINEAR	·	3.1 km	MPC · JPL
87713	2000 SO_{34}	—	September 24, 2000	Socorro	LINEAR	·	2.8 km	MPC · JPL
87714	2000 SD_{36}	—	September 24, 2000	Socorro	LINEAR	HOF	5.4 km	MPC · JPL
87715	2000 SM_{36}	—	September 24, 2000	Socorro	LINEAR	HNS	2.5 km	MPC · JPL
87716	2000 SP_{36}	—	September 24, 2000	Socorro	LINEAR	·	3.3 km	MPC · JPL
87717	2000 SK_{38}	—	September 24, 2000	Socorro	LINEAR	AGN	2.3 km	MPC · JPL
87718	2000 SY_{42}	—	September 25, 2000	Črni Vrh	Mikuž, H.	(5)	2.8 km	MPC · JPL
87719	2000 SL_{45}	—	September 22, 2000	Socorro	LINEAR	·	3.5 km	MPC · JPL
87720	2000 SS_{45}	—	September 22, 2000	Socorro	LINEAR	·	3.2 km	MPC · JPL
87721	2000 SV_{45}	—	September 22, 2000	Socorro	LINEAR	·	8.1 km	MPC · JPL
87722	2000 SD_{46}	—	September 22, 2000	Socorro	LINEAR	slow	5.6 km	MPC · JPL
87723	2000 SE_{46}	—	September 22, 2000	Socorro	LINEAR	·	2.5 km	MPC · JPL
87724	2000 SH_{46}	—	September 22, 2000	Socorro	LINEAR	·	4.2 km	MPC · JPL
87725	2000 SK_{46}	—	September 23, 2000	Socorro	LINEAR	EUN	3.5 km	MPC · JPL
87726	2000 SZ_{46}	—	September 23, 2000	Socorro	LINEAR	·	3.4 km	MPC · JPL
87727	2000 SA_{47}	—	September 23, 2000	Socorro	LINEAR	NAE	6.7 km	MPC · JPL
87728	2000 SU_{47}	—	September 23, 2000	Socorro	LINEAR	EUN	3.0 km	MPC · JPL
87729	2000 SW_{47}	—	September 23, 2000	Socorro	LINEAR	·	4.4 km	MPC · JPL
87730	2000 SJ_{50}	—	September 23, 2000	Socorro	LINEAR	fast	6.4 km	MPC · JPL
87731	2000 SA_{53}	—	September 24, 2000	Socorro	LINEAR	·	6.4 km	MPC · JPL
87732	2000 SQ_{55}	—	September 24, 2000	Socorro	LINEAR	·	3.7 km	MPC · JPL
87733	2000 SD_{56}	—	September 24, 2000	Socorro	LINEAR	WIT	2.0 km	MPC · JPL
87734	2000 SO_{58}	—	September 24, 2000	Socorro	LINEAR	·	2.3 km	MPC · JPL
87735	2000 SU_{58}	—	September 24, 2000	Socorro	LINEAR	·	3.9 km	MPC · JPL
87736	2000 SG_{60}	—	September 24, 2000	Socorro	LINEAR	·	3.3 km	MPC · JPL
87737	2000 SX_{60}	—	September 24, 2000	Socorro	LINEAR	·	2.4 km	MPC · JPL
87738	2000 SG_{61}	—	September 24, 2000	Socorro	LINEAR	·	3.5 km	MPC · JPL
87739	2000 SQ_{62}	—	September 24, 2000	Socorro	LINEAR	·	3.1 km	MPC · JPL
87740	2000 SK_{63}	—	September 24, 2000	Socorro	LINEAR	·	4.3 km	MPC · JPL
87741	2000 SP_{63}	—	September 24, 2000	Socorro	LINEAR	(5)	3.0 km	MPC · JPL
87742	2000 SH_{65}	—	September 24, 2000	Socorro	LINEAR	·	2.7 km	MPC · JPL
87743	2000 SP_{65}	—	September 24, 2000	Socorro	LINEAR	EOS ·	4.7 km	MPC · JPL
87744	2000 SX_{65}	—	September 24, 2000	Socorro	LINEAR	·	4.3 km	MPC · JPL
87745	2000 SX_{66}	—	September 24, 2000	Socorro	LINEAR	THM	5.4 km	MPC · JPL
87746	2000 SY_{70}	—	September 24, 2000	Socorro	LINEAR	·	4.8 km	MPC · JPL
87747	2000 ST_{71}	—	September 24, 2000	Socorro	LINEAR	·	5.2 km	MPC · JPL
87748	2000 SR_{72}	—	September 24, 2000	Socorro	LINEAR	·	3.0 km	MPC · JPL
87749	2000 SU_{72}	—	September 24, 2000	Socorro	LINEAR	·	4.2 km	MPC · JPL
87750	2000 SN_{73}	—	September 24, 2000	Socorro	LINEAR	·	3.6 km	MPC · JPL
87751	2000 SA_{74}	—	September 24, 2000	Socorro	LINEAR	·	2.6 km	MPC · JPL
87752	2000 SH_{74}	—	September 24, 2000	Socorro	LINEAR	·	5.5 km	MPC · JPL
87753	2000 SS_{75}	—	September 24, 2000	Socorro	LINEAR	·	2.6 km	MPC · JPL
87754	2000 SA_{76}	—	September 24, 2000	Socorro	LINEAR	·	2.8 km	MPC · JPL
87755	2000 SU_{80}	—	September 24, 2000	Socorro	LINEAR	·	6.3 km	MPC · JPL
87756	2000 SK_{81}	—	September 24, 2000	Socorro	LINEAR	·	4.4 km	MPC · JPL
87757	2000 SN_{84}	—	September 24, 2000	Socorro	LINEAR	·	5.3 km	MPC · JPL
87758	2000 SL_{85}	—	September 24, 2000	Socorro	LINEAR	·	4.1 km	MPC · JPL
87759	2000 SC_{88}	—	September 24, 2000	Socorro	LINEAR	HYG	6.4 km	MPC · JPL
87760	2000 SF_{88}	—	September 24, 2000	Socorro	LINEAR	·	4.4 km	MPC · JPL
87761	2000 SG_{89}	—	September 22, 2000	Socorro	LINEAR	·	3.2 km	MPC · JPL
87762	2000 SN_{89}	—	September 29, 2000	Nacogdoches	Bruton, W. D., Rodgers, G.	·	4.7 km	MPC · JPL
87763	2000 SL_{90}	—	September 22, 2000	Socorro	LINEAR	MAR	3.0 km	MPC · JPL
87764	2000 SW_{90}	—	September 22, 2000	Socorro	LINEAR	(10654)	9.5 km	MPC · JPL
87765	2000 SZ_{90}	—	September 22, 2000	Socorro	LINEAR	·	7.2 km	MPC · JPL
87766	2000 SF_{91}	—	September 23, 2000	Socorro	LINEAR	EUN	2.5 km	MPC · JPL
87767	2000 SZ_{91}	—	September 23, 2000	Socorro	LINEAR	EOS	4.1 km	MPC · JPL
87768	2000 SC_{92}	—	September 23, 2000	Socorro	LINEAR	(1118)	6.9 km	MPC · JPL
87769	2000 SC_{94}	—	September 23, 2000	Socorro	LINEAR	·	6.1 km	MPC · JPL
87770	2000 SB_{95}	—	September 23, 2000	Socorro	LINEAR	EOS	4.6 km	MPC · JPL
87771	2000 SB_{96}	—	September 23, 2000	Socorro	LINEAR	·	3.6 km	MPC · JPL
87772	2000 SQ_{97}	—	September 23, 2000	Socorro	LINEAR	·	2.7 km	MPC · JPL
87773	2000 SR_{98}	—	September 23, 2000	Socorro	LINEAR	·	2.9 km	MPC · JPL
87774	2000 SO_{99}	—	September 23, 2000	Socorro	LINEAR	PAD	2.9 km	MPC · JPL
87775	2000 SZ_{100}	—	September 23, 2000	Socorro	LINEAR	·	3.4 km	MPC · JPL
87776	2000 SK_{104}	—	September 24, 2000	Socorro	LINEAR	HOF	5.2 km	MPC · JPL
87777	2000 SR_{107}	—	September 24, 2000	Socorro	LINEAR	·	3.4 km	MPC · JPL
87778	2000 SU_{107}	—	September 24, 2000	Socorro	LINEAR	HOF	5.5 km	MPC · JPL
87779	2000 SY_{108}	—	September 24, 2000	Socorro	LINEAR	·	2.5 km	MPC · JPL
87780	2000 SM_{111}	—	September 24, 2000	Socorro	LINEAR	·	6.8 km	MPC · JPL
87781	2000 SP_{111}	—	September 24, 2000	Socorro	LINEAR	·	3.7 km	MPC · JPL
87782	2000 SF_{114}	—	September 24, 2000	Socorro	LINEAR	·	5.9 km	MPC · JPL
87783	2000 SH_{114}	—	September 24, 2000	Socorro	LINEAR	·	2.5 km	MPC · JPL
87784	2000 SC_{115}	—	September 24, 2000	Socorro	LINEAR	MRX	2.9 km	MPC · JPL
87785	2000 SW_{115}	—	September 24, 2000	Socorro	LINEAR	·	2.6 km	MPC · JPL
87786	2000 SV_{116}	—	September 24, 2000	Socorro	LINEAR	(5)	2.6 km	MPC · JPL
87787	2000 SV_{117}	—	September 24, 2000	Socorro	LINEAR	·	2.4 km	MPC · JPL
87788	2000 SX_{117}	—	September 24, 2000	Socorro	LINEAR	AEO	3.0 km	MPC · JPL
87789	2000 SN_{120}	—	September 24, 2000	Socorro	LINEAR	CYB	10 km	MPC · JPL
87790	2000 SS_{120}	—	September 24, 2000	Socorro	LINEAR	·	4.2 km	MPC · JPL
87791	2000 SJ_{121}	—	September 24, 2000	Socorro	LINEAR	·	4.4 km	MPC · JPL
87792	2000 SG_{124}	—	September 24, 2000	Socorro	LINEAR	·	3.1 km	MPC · JPL
87793	2000 SN_{127}	—	September 24, 2000	Socorro	LINEAR	PAD	2.6 km	MPC · JPL
87794	2000 SQ_{127}	—	September 24, 2000	Socorro	LINEAR	·	3.0 km	MPC · JPL
87795	2000 SZ_{127}	—	September 24, 2000	Socorro	LINEAR	·	7.0 km	MPC · JPL
87796	2000 SD_{128}	—	September 24, 2000	Socorro	LINEAR	KOR	3.1 km	MPC · JPL
87797	2000 SF_{130}	—	September 22, 2000	Socorro	LINEAR	·	5.9 km	MPC · JPL
87798	2000 SG_{130}	—	September 22, 2000	Socorro	LINEAR	·	2.9 km	MPC · JPL
87799	2000 SP_{130}	—	September 22, 2000	Socorro	LINEAR	EUN	3.3 km	MPC · JPL
87800	2000 SK_{131}	—	September 22, 2000	Socorro	LINEAR	EUN	2.4 km	MPC · JPL

== 87801–87900 ==
back to top

Designation			Discovery			Properties		Ref
Permanent	Provisional	Named after	Date	Site	Discoverer(s)	Category	Diam.	Ref
87801	2000 SC_{132}	—	September 22, 2000	Socorro	LINEAR	·	7.9 km	MPC · JPL
87802	2000 SO_{132}	—	September 22, 2000	Socorro	LINEAR	·	2.9 km	MPC · JPL
87803	2000 SE_{137}	—	September 23, 2000	Socorro	LINEAR	EUN	3.0 km	MPC · JPL
87804	2000 SS_{137}	—	September 23, 2000	Socorro	LINEAR	EUN	3.1 km	MPC · JPL
87805	2000 SK_{140}	—	September 23, 2000	Socorro	LINEAR	·	4.6 km	MPC · JPL
87806	2000 SR_{140}	—	September 23, 2000	Socorro	LINEAR	·	4.3 km	MPC · JPL
87807	2000 SZ_{141}	—	September 23, 2000	Socorro	LINEAR	·	3.8 km	MPC · JPL
87808	2000 SO_{142}	—	September 23, 2000	Socorro	LINEAR	·	6.6 km	MPC · JPL
87809	2000 SE_{143}	—	September 23, 2000	Socorro	LINEAR	·	5.9 km	MPC · JPL
87810	2000 SE_{145}	—	September 24, 2000	Socorro	LINEAR	·	2.5 km	MPC · JPL
87811	2000 SO_{145}	—	September 24, 2000	Socorro	LINEAR	T_{j} (2.97) · 3:2	12 km	MPC · JPL
87812	2000 SL_{146}	—	September 24, 2000	Socorro	LINEAR	TIR	6.2 km	MPC · JPL
87813	2000 SC_{147}	—	September 24, 2000	Socorro	LINEAR	HYG	6.1 km	MPC · JPL
87814	2000 SG_{154}	—	September 24, 2000	Socorro	LINEAR	·	5.8 km	MPC · JPL
87815	2000 SR_{155}	—	September 24, 2000	Socorro	LINEAR	·	3.2 km	MPC · JPL
87816	2000 SA_{156}	—	September 24, 2000	Socorro	LINEAR	HYG	6.8 km	MPC · JPL
87817	2000 SF_{157}	—	September 26, 2000	Socorro	LINEAR	·	3.7 km	MPC · JPL
87818	2000 SS_{157}	—	September 27, 2000	Socorro	LINEAR	WIT	1.9 km	MPC · JPL
87819	2000 SZ_{161}	—	September 20, 2000	Haleakala	NEAT	EOS	5.7 km	MPC · JPL
87820	2000 SD_{162}	—	September 20, 2000	Haleakala	NEAT	·	2.7 km	MPC · JPL
87821	2000 ST_{162}	—	September 30, 2000	Elmira	Cecce, A. J.	RAF	3.8 km	MPC · JPL
87822	2000 SB_{165}	—	September 23, 2000	Socorro	LINEAR	·	6.1 km	MPC · JPL
87823	2000 SA_{167}	—	September 23, 2000	Socorro	LINEAR	·	3.9 km	MPC · JPL
87824	2000 SG_{167}	—	September 23, 2000	Socorro	LINEAR	·	4.6 km	MPC · JPL
87825	2000 SF_{168}	—	September 23, 2000	Socorro	LINEAR	·	3.6 km	MPC · JPL
87826	2000 SM_{168}	—	September 23, 2000	Socorro	LINEAR	·	5.2 km	MPC · JPL
87827	2000 SB_{170}	—	September 24, 2000	Socorro	LINEAR	PAD	4.9 km	MPC · JPL
87828	2000 SS_{170}	—	September 24, 2000	Socorro	LINEAR	EUN	2.9 km	MPC · JPL
87829	2000 SA_{173}	—	September 28, 2000	Socorro	LINEAR	HNS	3.5 km	MPC · JPL
87830	2000 SL_{173}	—	September 28, 2000	Socorro	LINEAR	·	5.8 km	MPC · JPL
87831	2000 SY_{174}	—	September 28, 2000	Socorro	LINEAR	RAF	2.1 km	MPC · JPL
87832	2000 SD_{178}	—	September 28, 2000	Socorro	LINEAR	·	4.9 km	MPC · JPL
87833	2000 SL_{178}	—	September 28, 2000	Socorro	LINEAR	·	5.6 km	MPC · JPL
87834	2000 SD_{179}	—	September 28, 2000	Socorro	LINEAR	·	4.0 km	MPC · JPL
87835	2000 SE_{182}	—	September 20, 2000	Socorro	LINEAR	(5)	2.6 km	MPC · JPL
87836	2000 SH_{183}	—	September 20, 2000	Haleakala	NEAT	·	6.4 km	MPC · JPL
87837	2000 SK_{186}	—	September 21, 2000	Haleakala	NEAT	·	2.7 km	MPC · JPL
87838	2000 SA_{187}	—	September 21, 2000	Haleakala	NEAT	EUN	2.8 km	MPC · JPL
87839	2000 SX_{190}	—	September 23, 2000	Socorro	LINEAR	·	3.4 km	MPC · JPL
87840	2000 SW_{193}	—	September 24, 2000	Socorro	LINEAR	·	3.3 km	MPC · JPL
87841	2000 SU_{198}	—	September 24, 2000	Socorro	LINEAR	·	2.4 km	MPC · JPL
87842	2000 SW_{199}	—	September 24, 2000	Socorro	LINEAR	·	3.6 km	MPC · JPL
87843	2000 SH_{202}	—	September 24, 2000	Socorro	LINEAR	GEF	2.5 km	MPC · JPL
87844	2000 SS_{203}	—	September 24, 2000	Socorro	LINEAR	·	4.9 km	MPC · JPL
87845	2000 SG_{208}	—	September 24, 2000	Socorro	LINEAR	·	4.2 km	MPC · JPL
87846	2000 SS_{209}	—	September 25, 2000	Socorro	LINEAR	·	3.7 km	MPC · JPL
87847	2000 SM_{210}	—	September 25, 2000	Socorro	LINEAR	·	5.9 km	MPC · JPL
87848	2000 SJ_{212}	—	September 25, 2000	Socorro	LINEAR	·	5.6 km	MPC · JPL
87849	2000 SR_{212}	—	September 25, 2000	Socorro	LINEAR	·	5.1 km	MPC · JPL
87850	2000 SP_{213}	—	September 25, 2000	Socorro	LINEAR	·	5.0 km	MPC · JPL
87851	2000 SD_{218}	—	September 26, 2000	Socorro	LINEAR	·	5.5 km	MPC · JPL
87852	2000 SP_{219}	—	September 26, 2000	Socorro	LINEAR	GEF	3.6 km	MPC · JPL
87853	2000 SW_{219}	—	September 26, 2000	Socorro	LINEAR	·	3.0 km	MPC · JPL
87854	2000 SY_{219}	—	September 26, 2000	Socorro	LINEAR	GEF	2.9 km	MPC · JPL
87855	2000 SB_{220}	—	September 26, 2000	Socorro	LINEAR	·	2.7 km	MPC · JPL
87856	2000 SM_{220}	—	September 26, 2000	Socorro	LINEAR	EUN	2.1 km	MPC · JPL
87857	2000 SD_{222}	—	September 26, 2000	Socorro	LINEAR	·	5.0 km	MPC · JPL
87858	2000 ST_{225}	—	September 27, 2000	Socorro	LINEAR	·	3.5 km	MPC · JPL
87859	2000 SX_{225}	—	September 27, 2000	Socorro	LINEAR	TIR	8.3 km	MPC · JPL
87860	2000 SR_{226}	—	September 27, 2000	Socorro	LINEAR	·	4.3 km	MPC · JPL
87861	2000 SH_{229}	—	September 28, 2000	Socorro	LINEAR	·	3.0 km	MPC · JPL
87862	2000 SJ_{231}	—	September 30, 2000	Socorro	LINEAR	·	4.7 km	MPC · JPL
87863	2000 SE_{234}	—	September 21, 2000	Socorro	LINEAR	·	8.2 km	MPC · JPL
87864	2000 SQ_{238}	—	September 26, 2000	Socorro	LINEAR	·	3.6 km	MPC · JPL
87865	2000 SK_{240}	—	September 25, 2000	Socorro	LINEAR	·	3.1 km	MPC · JPL
87866	2000 SB_{243}	—	September 24, 2000	Socorro	LINEAR	·	2.9 km	MPC · JPL
87867	2000 SJ_{245}	—	September 24, 2000	Socorro	LINEAR	·	6.4 km	MPC · JPL
87868	2000 SR_{251}	—	September 24, 2000	Socorro	LINEAR	·	4.8 km	MPC · JPL
87869	2000 SD_{256}	—	September 24, 2000	Socorro	LINEAR	PAD	4.9 km	MPC · JPL
87870	2000 SQ_{257}	—	September 24, 2000	Socorro	LINEAR	AGN	2.2 km	MPC · JPL
87871	2000 SX_{262}	—	September 25, 2000	Socorro	LINEAR	·	4.7 km	MPC · JPL
87872	2000 SE_{268}	—	September 27, 2000	Socorro	LINEAR	·	5.9 km	MPC · JPL
87873	2000 SH_{269}	—	September 27, 2000	Socorro	LINEAR	·	4.1 km	MPC · JPL
87874	2000 SW_{269}	—	September 27, 2000	Socorro	LINEAR	·	4.2 km	MPC · JPL
87875	2000 ST_{270}	—	September 27, 2000	Socorro	LINEAR	·	4.2 km	MPC · JPL
87876	2000 SB_{271}	—	September 27, 2000	Socorro	LINEAR	·	3.2 km	MPC · JPL
87877	2000 SS_{273}	—	September 28, 2000	Socorro	LINEAR	·	5.5 km	MPC · JPL
87878	2000 SG_{275}	—	September 28, 2000	Socorro	LINEAR	·	2.6 km	MPC · JPL
87879	2000 SH_{275}	—	September 28, 2000	Socorro	LINEAR	HYG	9.0 km	MPC · JPL
87880	2000 SO_{276}	—	September 30, 2000	Socorro	LINEAR	·	6.0 km	MPC · JPL
87881	2000 SC_{277}	—	September 30, 2000	Socorro	LINEAR	·	2.7 km	MPC · JPL
87882	2000 SN_{278}	—	September 30, 2000	Socorro	LINEAR	EOS	4.2 km	MPC · JPL
87883	2000 SO_{278}	—	September 30, 2000	Socorro	LINEAR	·	8.7 km	MPC · JPL
87884	2000 SN_{279}	—	September 25, 2000	Socorro	LINEAR	·	4.4 km	MPC · JPL
87885	2000 SF_{283}	—	September 23, 2000	Socorro	LINEAR	·	2.7 km	MPC · JPL
87886	2000 SJ_{285}	—	September 23, 2000	Socorro	LINEAR	·	3.1 km	MPC · JPL
87887	2000 SS_{286}	—	September 26, 2000	Socorro	LINEAR	GEF	2.5 km	MPC · JPL
87888	2000 ST_{287}	—	September 26, 2000	Socorro	LINEAR	EUN	3.3 km	MPC · JPL
87889	2000 SA_{288}	—	September 26, 2000	Socorro	LINEAR	EUN	4.2 km	MPC · JPL
87890	2000 SE_{288}	—	September 26, 2000	Socorro	LINEAR	·	3.0 km	MPC · JPL
87891	2000 SW_{290}	—	September 27, 2000	Socorro	LINEAR	WIT	1.7 km	MPC · JPL
87892	2000 SS_{292}	—	September 27, 2000	Socorro	LINEAR	NAE · slow	9.0 km	MPC · JPL
87893	2000 SL_{293}	—	September 27, 2000	Socorro	LINEAR	·	3.7 km	MPC · JPL
87894	2000 SF_{295}	—	September 27, 2000	Socorro	LINEAR	EUN	3.8 km	MPC · JPL
87895	2000 SP_{298}	—	September 28, 2000	Socorro	LINEAR	·	3.6 km	MPC · JPL
87896	2000 SE_{300}	—	September 28, 2000	Socorro	LINEAR	·	3.5 km	MPC · JPL
87897	2000 SH_{300}	—	September 28, 2000	Socorro	LINEAR	·	3.1 km	MPC · JPL
87898	2000 SC_{305}	—	September 30, 2000	Socorro	LINEAR	VER ·	7.2 km	MPC · JPL
87899	2000 SH_{306}	—	September 30, 2000	Socorro	LINEAR	·	6.1 km	MPC · JPL
87900	2000 SJ_{306}	—	September 30, 2000	Socorro	LINEAR	·	3.9 km	MPC · JPL

== 87901–88000 ==
back to top

Designation			Discovery			Properties		Ref
Permanent	Provisional	Named after	Date	Site	Discoverer(s)	Category	Diam.	Ref
87901	2000 SN_{306}	—	September 30, 2000	Socorro	LINEAR	GEF	3.1 km	MPC · JPL
87902	2000 SQ_{307}	—	September 30, 2000	Socorro	LINEAR	·	4.2 km	MPC · JPL
87903	2000 ST_{308}	—	September 30, 2000	Socorro	LINEAR	·	3.0 km	MPC · JPL
87904	2000 SR_{309}	—	September 24, 2000	Socorro	LINEAR	·	4.3 km	MPC · JPL
87905	2000 SH_{310}	—	September 26, 2000	Socorro	LINEAR	·	6.5 km	MPC · JPL
87906	2000 SP_{310}	—	September 26, 2000	Socorro	LINEAR	HNS	2.7 km	MPC · JPL
87907	2000 SQ_{310}	—	September 26, 2000	Socorro	LINEAR	HNS	3.4 km	MPC · JPL
87908	2000 SJ_{311}	—	September 26, 2000	Socorro	LINEAR	HNS	3.9 km	MPC · JPL
87909	2000 SH_{312}	—	September 27, 2000	Socorro	LINEAR	·	4.4 km	MPC · JPL
87910	2000 SV_{312}	—	September 27, 2000	Socorro	LINEAR	EUN	3.6 km	MPC · JPL
87911	2000 SZ_{312}	—	September 27, 2000	Socorro	LINEAR	·	3.6 km	MPC · JPL
87912	2000 SS_{313}	—	September 27, 2000	Socorro	LINEAR	·	3.4 km	MPC · JPL
87913	2000 SU_{313}	—	September 27, 2000	Socorro	LINEAR	·	5.0 km	MPC · JPL
87914	2000 SY_{313}	—	September 27, 2000	Socorro	LINEAR	·	3.4 km	MPC · JPL
87915	2000 SB_{315}	—	September 28, 2000	Socorro	LINEAR	·	3.8 km	MPC · JPL
87916	2000 SH_{315}	—	September 28, 2000	Socorro	LINEAR	·	4.8 km	MPC · JPL
87917	2000 SF_{316}	—	September 30, 2000	Socorro	LINEAR	·	8.0 km	MPC · JPL
87918	2000 SQ_{316}	—	September 30, 2000	Socorro	LINEAR	·	3.1 km	MPC · JPL
87919	2000 SZ_{316}	—	September 30, 2000	Socorro	LINEAR	URS	9.0 km	MPC · JPL
87920	2000 SM_{317}	—	September 30, 2000	Socorro	LINEAR	·	6.3 km	MPC · JPL
87921	2000 SC_{318}	—	September 30, 2000	Socorro	LINEAR	·	6.2 km	MPC · JPL
87922	2000 SM_{318}	—	September 29, 2000	Haleakala	NEAT	·	3.7 km	MPC · JPL
87923	2000 SV_{318}	—	September 26, 2000	Socorro	LINEAR	·	6.7 km	MPC · JPL
87924	2000 SB_{319}	—	September 26, 2000	Socorro	LINEAR	·	4.5 km	MPC · JPL
87925	2000 SG_{319}	—	September 26, 2000	Socorro	LINEAR	EUN	5.8 km	MPC · JPL
87926	2000 SZ_{319}	—	September 27, 2000	Socorro	LINEAR	EUP	12 km	MPC · JPL
87927	2000 SN_{321}	—	September 28, 2000	Kitt Peak	Spacewatch	·	2.1 km	MPC · JPL
87928	2000 SB_{328}	—	September 30, 2000	Socorro	LINEAR	·	3.5 km	MPC · JPL
87929	2000 SA_{331}	—	September 28, 2000	Socorro	LINEAR	·	3.8 km	MPC · JPL
87930	2000 SS_{333}	—	September 26, 2000	Socorro	LINEAR	·	2.5 km	MPC · JPL
87931	2000 ST_{333}	—	September 26, 2000	Haleakala	NEAT	EUN	2.5 km	MPC · JPL
87932	2000 SW_{343}	—	September 22, 2000	Socorro	LINEAR	EUN	4.6 km	MPC · JPL
87933 Bernardschmitt	2000 SL_{346}	Bernardschmitt	September 21, 2000	Kitt Peak	M. W. Buie	·	3.5 km	MPC · JPL
87934	2000 SF_{347}	—	September 25, 2000	Socorro	LINEAR	HNS · slow	5.4 km	MPC · JPL
87935	2000 SG_{347}	—	September 25, 2000	Socorro	LINEAR	HNS	4.9 km	MPC · JPL
87936	2000 SG_{350}	—	September 29, 2000	Anderson Mesa	LONEOS	·	2.4 km	MPC · JPL
87937	2000 SM_{350}	—	September 29, 2000	Anderson Mesa	LONEOS	EUN	2.4 km	MPC · JPL
87938	2000 SL_{351}	—	September 29, 2000	Anderson Mesa	LONEOS	·	4.2 km	MPC · JPL
87939	2000 SF_{353}	—	September 30, 2000	Anderson Mesa	LONEOS	·	3.4 km	MPC · JPL
87940	2000 SQ_{354}	—	September 29, 2000	Anderson Mesa	LONEOS	·	2.7 km	MPC · JPL
87941	2000 SG_{356}	—	September 29, 2000	Anderson Mesa	LONEOS	EOS	5.3 km	MPC · JPL
87942	2000 SP_{356}	—	September 29, 2000	Anderson Mesa	LONEOS	MAR	2.4 km	MPC · JPL
87943	2000 SM_{357}	—	September 28, 2000	Anderson Mesa	LONEOS	EUN	2.2 km	MPC · JPL
87944	2000 SZ_{357}	—	September 28, 2000	Anderson Mesa	LONEOS	URS	8.0 km	MPC · JPL
87945	2000 SQ_{358}	—	September 24, 2000	Haleakala	NEAT	EUN	3.5 km	MPC · JPL
87946	2000 SW_{359}	—	September 26, 2000	Anderson Mesa	LONEOS	·	3.9 km	MPC · JPL
87947	2000 SJ_{360}	—	September 26, 2000	Haleakala	NEAT	·	3.3 km	MPC · JPL
87948	2000 SY_{361}	—	September 23, 2000	Anderson Mesa	LONEOS	·	4.5 km	MPC · JPL
87949	2000 SR_{362}	—	September 20, 2000	Socorro	LINEAR	GEF	4.1 km	MPC · JPL
87950	2000 SG_{367}	—	September 22, 2000	Socorro	LINEAR	MAR	2.5 km	MPC · JPL
87951	2000 SZ_{368}	—	September 22, 2000	Anderson Mesa	LONEOS	ADE	4.5 km	MPC · JPL
87952	2000 SV_{369}	—	September 24, 2000	Anderson Mesa	LONEOS	·	1.8 km	MPC · JPL
87953	2000 SC_{370}	—	September 24, 2000	Anderson Mesa	LONEOS	·	2.6 km	MPC · JPL
87954 Tomkaye	2000 TK	Tomkaye	October 2, 2000	Fountain Hills	C. W. Juels	EUN	3.4 km	MPC · JPL
87955	2000 TL_{4}	—	October 1, 2000	Socorro	LINEAR	·	4.5 km	MPC · JPL
87956	2000 TM_{4}	—	October 1, 2000	Socorro	LINEAR	3:2	6.9 km	MPC · JPL
87957	2000 TQ_{12}	—	October 1, 2000	Socorro	LINEAR	·	4.3 km	MPC · JPL
87958	2000 TS_{15}	—	October 1, 2000	Socorro	LINEAR	HOF	5.0 km	MPC · JPL
87959	2000 TF_{18}	—	October 1, 2000	Socorro	LINEAR	·	5.7 km	MPC · JPL
87960	2000 TU_{19}	—	October 1, 2000	Socorro	LINEAR	EUN	4.0 km	MPC · JPL
87961	2000 TV_{19}	—	October 1, 2000	Socorro	LINEAR	·	2.6 km	MPC · JPL
87962	2000 TB_{20}	—	October 1, 2000	Socorro	LINEAR	VER	6.8 km	MPC · JPL
87963	2000 TK_{21}	—	October 1, 2000	Socorro	LINEAR	·	6.5 km	MPC · JPL
87964	2000 TM_{28}	—	October 3, 2000	Socorro	LINEAR	·	3.7 km	MPC · JPL
87965	2000 TX_{28}	—	October 6, 2000	Fountain Hills	C. W. Juels	·	5.7 km	MPC · JPL
87966	2000 TX_{32}	—	October 3, 2000	Socorro	LINEAR	·	3.5 km	MPC · JPL
87967	2000 TR_{33}	—	October 5, 2000	Socorro	LINEAR	·	4.4 km	MPC · JPL
87968	2000 TS_{33}	—	October 5, 2000	Socorro	LINEAR	·	4.0 km	MPC · JPL
87969	2000 TV_{37}	—	October 1, 2000	Socorro	LINEAR	·	6.1 km	MPC · JPL
87970	2000 TT_{38}	—	October 1, 2000	Socorro	LINEAR	RAF	3.3 km	MPC · JPL
87971	2000 TW_{38}	—	October 1, 2000	Socorro	LINEAR	·	6.6 km	MPC · JPL
87972	2000 TJ_{39}	—	October 1, 2000	Socorro	LINEAR	·	3.7 km	MPC · JPL
87973	2000 TX_{39}	—	October 1, 2000	Socorro	LINEAR	·	2.9 km	MPC · JPL
87974	2000 TR_{41}	—	October 1, 2000	Socorro	LINEAR	·	3.8 km	MPC · JPL
87975	2000 TR_{42}	—	October 1, 2000	Socorro	LINEAR	EOS	4.7 km	MPC · JPL
87976	2000 TP_{43}	—	October 1, 2000	Socorro	LINEAR	·	4.6 km	MPC · JPL
87977	2000 TY_{43}	—	October 1, 2000	Socorro	LINEAR	·	3.4 km	MPC · JPL
87978	2000 TG_{44}	—	October 1, 2000	Socorro	LINEAR	·	1.7 km	MPC · JPL
87979	2000 TL_{45}	—	October 1, 2000	Socorro	LINEAR	EOS	4.8 km	MPC · JPL
87980	2000 TT_{53}	—	October 1, 2000	Socorro	LINEAR	(21344)	2.8 km	MPC · JPL
87981	2000 TS_{55}	—	October 1, 2000	Socorro	LINEAR	·	3.4 km	MPC · JPL
87982	2000 TA_{57}	—	October 2, 2000	Anderson Mesa	LONEOS	·	4.0 km	MPC · JPL
87983	2000 TB_{57}	—	October 2, 2000	Anderson Mesa	LONEOS	EOS	3.3 km	MPC · JPL
87984	2000 TP_{57}	—	October 2, 2000	Anderson Mesa	LONEOS	·	2.3 km	MPC · JPL
87985	2000 TJ_{58}	—	October 2, 2000	Socorro	LINEAR	·	3.0 km	MPC · JPL
87986	2000 TD_{59}	—	October 2, 2000	Anderson Mesa	LONEOS	EUN	2.5 km	MPC · JPL
87987	2000 TF_{59}	—	October 2, 2000	Anderson Mesa	LONEOS	EUN	3.4 km	MPC · JPL
87988	2000 TZ_{62}	—	October 2, 2000	Socorro	LINEAR	·	2.4 km	MPC · JPL
87989	2000 UG_{1}	—	October 21, 2000	Desert Beaver	W. K. Y. Yeung	·	7.4 km	MPC · JPL
87990	2000 UV_{4}	—	October 24, 2000	Socorro	LINEAR	KOR	3.1 km	MPC · JPL
87991	2000 UK_{6}	—	October 24, 2000	Socorro	LINEAR	·	4.6 km	MPC · JPL
87992	2000 UL_{7}	—	October 24, 2000	Socorro	LINEAR	·	4.5 km	MPC · JPL
87993	2000 UM_{10}	—	October 24, 2000	Socorro	LINEAR	·	4.8 km	MPC · JPL
87994	2000 UA_{11}	—	October 25, 2000	Socorro	LINEAR	EOS	4.1 km	MPC · JPL
87995	2000 UF_{12}	—	October 24, 2000	Socorro	LINEAR	·	3.4 km	MPC · JPL
87996	2000 UP_{21}	—	October 24, 2000	Socorro	LINEAR	AGN	2.4 km	MPC · JPL
87997	2000 UG_{24}	—	October 24, 2000	Socorro	LINEAR	NEM	4.5 km	MPC · JPL
87998	2000 UY_{27}	—	October 25, 2000	Socorro	LINEAR	·	3.9 km	MPC · JPL
87999	2000 UX_{28}	—	October 30, 2000	Socorro	LINEAR	EOS	3.0 km	MPC · JPL
88000	2000 UB_{36}	—	October 24, 2000	Socorro	LINEAR	·	4.7 km	MPC · JPL

back to top

== See also ==
- Meanings of minor-planet names: 87001–88000
