= Kokubunji =

Kokubunji (国分寺) can refer to:

- Kokubunji, Tokyo
- Kokubunji, Kagawa
- Kokubunji, Tochigi
- Kokubunji Station, a station in Kokubunji, Tokyo operated by Seibu Railway and JR East
- Seibu Kokubunji Line, a railway operated by Seibu Railway
- Kokubun-ji, Provincial temples in Japan
- 87271 Kokubunji, an asteroid
