= Kokubu Morishige =

Japanese samurai

Kokubu Morishige (国分 盛重, 1553 – September 7, 1615) was a Japanese samurai of the Sengoku through early Edo period. He was a fifth son of Date Harumune. Morishige, also known by his court title Noto no Kami 能登守, was the uncle of Date Masamune. He was also the last lord of Matsumori Castle.
