= Beauty Kokubu =

Japanese impressionist (born 1973)

- ビューティーこくぶ
- Born: Hideyuki Kokubu; 12 November 1973 (age 52); Shibuya, Tokyo, Japan
- Occupation: Impressionist
- Television: Bakushō sokkuri monomane Kōhaku Uta Gassen Special; Enta no Kamisama; Monomane Ōzakettei-sen

Beauty Kokubu (ビューティーこくぶ, Byūtī Kokubu; born 12 November 1973 in Shibuya, Tokyo, Japan) is a Japanese impressionist (monomane tarento). His real name is Hideyuki Kokubu (国分 秀之, Kokubu Hideyuki).

Kokubu is represented with Big World.

== Biography ==
Kokubu started doing impressions when he was at a classroom sideshow in middle school.

When he worked as a salesperson at a precision instrument measuring manufacturer, he was joined with an acquaintance at the impressionist live house Sokkuri Tate Kisara at Shinjuku, Tokyo, this triggered him to start doing impressions on stage. Kokubu's first impression at Kisara was the members of Kome Kome Club.

While working as both as a salesman and an impressionist, he felt that he prefer impressions more, and later retire from being a salesman to concentrate on his impressions. Kokubu originally doing impressions of the Kome Kome Club members, he gradually increased his repertoire. In about two and a half years after his debut at Kisara, he became a regular of Bakushō sokkuri monomane Kōhaku Uta Gassen Special.

Later in 2008 Kokubu was nickname Jawanet Takana (ジャワネットたかな) when he appeared in Enta no Kamisama, in which he made an impression of former Japanet Takata president Akira Takata. He was later appointed for the advertisements of Japanet Takata from January to March 2009, in which he played alongside Takata himself.

In the 28 December 2012 broadcast of Nihonichi wa Dareda? Monomane Ōzakettei-sen: Saikyō Tournament Chō Gekokujō Special, Kokubu was placed first during his second appearance.

He continued to participate in Monomane Ōzakettei-sen, he won the final game for three consecutive years from 2013 to 2015, but he missed the championship.

== Impressions ==
Kokubu mainly did singing impressions.

- Ryuichi Kawamura
- K
- Sachiko Kobayashi
- Shōsuke Tanihara
- Hideaki Tokunaga
- Motohiro Hata
- Kiyoshi Hikawa
- Ken Hirai
- Akira Fuse
- Bae Yong-joon
- Takashi Hosokawa
- Noriyuki Makihara
- Hibari Misora
- Yoshikazu Mera
- Naotarō Moriyama
- Masayoshi Yamazaki
- Tatsuro Yamashita
  - During his initial appearance in Bakushō sokkuri monomane Kōhaku Uta Gassen Special, he appeared as Yamashita's look-alike.

== Filmography ==
=== Regular appearances ===
Title	Network	Notes
Bakushō sokkuri monomane Kōhaku Uta Gassen Special	Fuji TV	
Obiraji R	TBS	
Waratte Iitomo!	Fuji TV	Originally announced before broadcasting on Monday

=== Irregular appearances ===
Title	Network	Notes
Bakushō Red Carpet	Fuji TV	Catchphrase is "Warai no Kinri Futan shimasu"
Happy Music	NTV	
Enta no Kamisama	NTV	Formerly regular appearances; catchphrase is "High Tension no TV Shopping"; as Jawanet Takana in regular; in Beauty Kokubu in irregular

=== Dubbing ===
Title	Role	Network
Jumong	Yonpo	BS Fuji
The Kingdom of the Winds	Tojin	BS Fuji

=== TV drama ===
Year	Title	Role	Network	Notes
2011	Yūsha Yoshihiko	Tadata	TV Tokyo	Episode 7
2012	Unofficial Sentai Akibaranger	Salesperson (Blu-ray assistant manager's human state)	BS Asahi	Episode 2

=== Advertisements ===
Year	Title	Notes	Ref.
2009	Japanet Takata Zenkoku Issei Orikomi Chirashi PR		
	Riken Vitamin Shōga de wakame Soup	Co-starring with Mari Sekine	
2010	Malera Gifu		
2010	Shueisha More	Voice	
2015	Kirin Nodogoshi Zettai nakayoshi Server Zettai! Moraeru Campaign		

=== Former appearances ===
Year	Title	Network	Notes
	Big Wednesday	NTV	
	Chō sokkuri Ningen Series	TV Asahi	
	Zennihon sokkuri Taishō	TV Tokyo	
	Ura Neta Geinō Wide: Shūkan emyi Show	KTV	
	Bakushō White Carpet	Fuji TV	His catch copy is "Warai no Kinri Futan Shimasu"
	Doors 2009 Haru	TBS	
	Hi! Hey! Say!	TV Tokyo	
	Goro Presents: My Fair Lady	TBS	
2010	Downtown no Gaki no Tsukai ya arahen de!!	NTV	
2010	Takajin no soko made itte Iinkai	YTV	
2010	UnNan no Rough Kanji de.	TBS	

== Discography ==
As Beauty Kokubu

Year	Title	Notes
2003	"Yosakoi Urara: Haru Urara no Theme"	Participated as a member of Restrus
2005	"CM no Hanamichi"	He imitated sixteen singers

As Hideyuki Kokubu

Year	Title	Ref.
2008	"Kimiiro no Hana"	
