= Sachiko Kokubu =

Japanese actress and fashion model

Sachiko Kokubu (国分 佐智子, Kokubu Sachiko; born December 5, 1976, Tokyo) is a Japanese actress and fashion model. She has starred in several TV dramas and movies, including the 2004 horror film Tokyo Psycho.

== Biography ==
Kokubu was married in 2011 and had her first child in 2016.

== Filmography ==
=== Film ===
- Onmyoji (2001)
- Tokyo Psycho (2004)

=== Television ===
- I Am a Nurse 3 (2000)
- Unbound (2025), Tsuya
