= Ashina =

Ashina may refer to:

== People ==
- Ashina clan (Japan), one of the Japanese clans
  - Ashina Morikiyo (1490–1553) Japanese daimyō
  - Ashina Moriuji (1521–1580) Japanese daimyō
  - Ashina Moritaka (1561–1584) Japanese samurai and lord of Kurokawa Castle
- Ashina tribe, a ruling dynasty of the Turkic Khaganate
  - Empress Ashina (551–582), empress of the Chinese/Xianbei dynasty Northern Zhou
  - Ashina Chengqing Turkic royal prince of the Ashina clan
  - Ashina Duzhi Qaghan of the Western Turkic Khaganate
  - Ashina Sunishi general from the Eastern Turkic Khaganate
  - Ashina Tuizi Qaghan of the Western Turkic Khaganate
  - Ashina Xian Western Turk khagan
  - Ashina Yuanqing puppet Turkic khagan installed by Wu Zetian in 685
- Sei Ashina (1983–2020), Japanese actress

== Places ==
- Ashina District, Hiroshima, a former Japanese district

== See also ==
- Main setting of Sekiro: Shadows Die Twice
- Asena, a mythical female wolf found in old Turkic mythology
- Ashna (disambiguation)
