= Mukaihaguroyama Castle =

Mukaihaguroyama Castle 向羽黒山城
- Aizumisato, Fukushima Prefecture, Japan
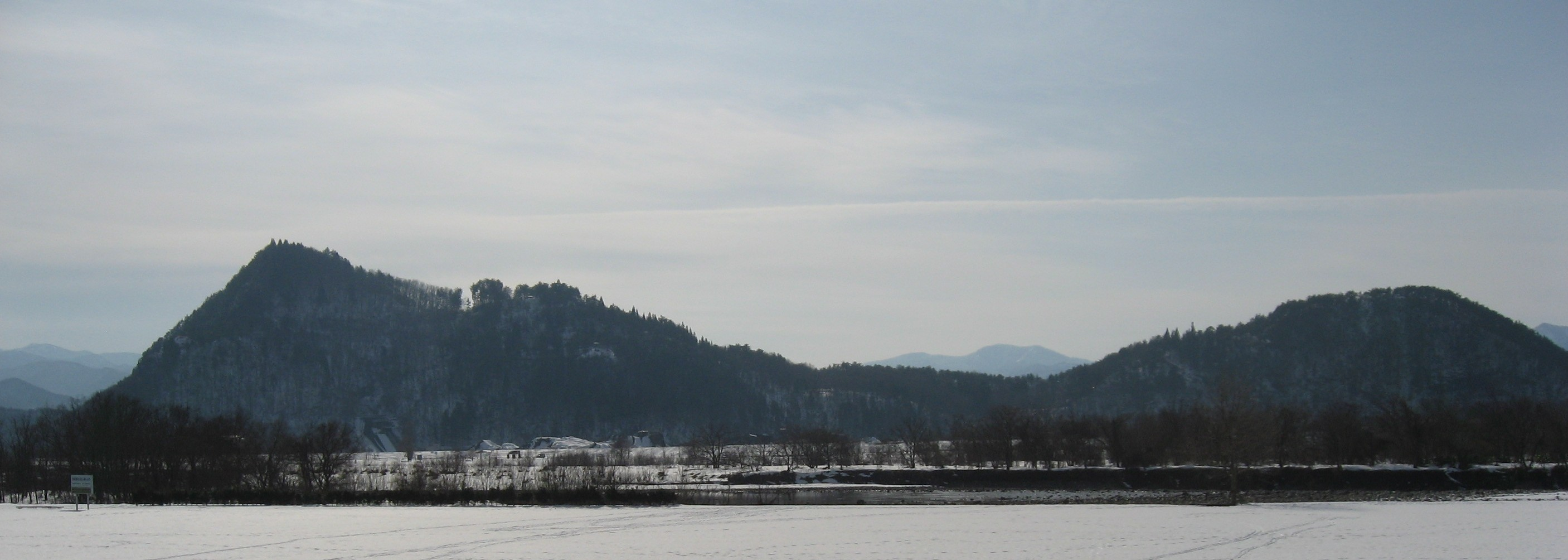
- Mukaihaguroyama Castle

Site information
- Type: hilltop-style Japanese castle
- Open to the public: yes
- Condition: ruins

Location
- Location within Fukushima Prefecture Location within Japan
- Coordinates: 37°26′43.4″N 139°54′0″E

Site history
- Built: 1568
- Built by: Ashina clan
- In use: Sengoku period
- Demolished: 1602

Mukaihaguroyama Castle (向羽黒山城, Mukaihaguroyama-jō), also known as Iwasaki Castle (岩崎城, Iwasaki-jō), was an Edo period Japanese castle located in the town of Aizumisato, southern Fukushima Prefecture, Japan. The site has been protected by the central government as a National Historic Site since 2001. It is ranked as one of the five largest Sengoku period yamashiro (including Kasugayama Castle (Echigo province), Nanao Castle (Noto Province), Odani Castle and Kannonji Castle (Omi Province) and Gassantoda Castle (Iwami Province).

== Background ==
Mukaihaguroyama Castle is located on top of Mount Iwasaki, a 180-meter hill near the Aga River, and at the southern edge of the Aizu Basin, and just ten kilometers from Aizuwakamatsu Castle. The castle speaks across the higher south peak and lower north peak of Mount Iwaki, with a total area of 600 square meters, which was very large for a castle of this period,

As a castle built at the peak of Ashina clan power, Mukaihaguroyama castle is huge and functionally built. Total size of castle reached 600 meter square, and extremely huge as a castle of this period. The entrance was at the saddle point between these two peaks, and was protected by a masugata-gate and stone walls. The ruins of a Japanese garden have been found on the saddle point, indicating that this was the residence of the lord. The fortifications consisted of numerous narrow enclosures (kuruwa) protected by both horizontal and vertical dry moats and earthen embankments, connected by narrow pathways, which extended to the north and west from each peak. The eastern and southern approaches to the castle were protected by the river and by steep cliffs.

== History ==
During the Sengoku period, northern Mutsu came under the control of the Ashina clan, originally retainers of the Date clan, who had declared their independence during one of the Date clan's numerous internal conflicts. Ashina Moriuji (1521–1580) expanded his territory from the Yonezawa basin to the Aizu and Nakadōri regions, seizing Shirakawa Castle and Nihonmatsu Castle and building Kurokawa Castle (later known as Aizuwakamatsu Castle as his capital. When he retired and turned power over to his son, Ashina Morioki (1547–1574), he built Mukaihaguroyama Castle as his place of retirement and to strengthen the defenses of the Ashina territories to the south. The defenses of the castle were strengthen by Ashina Moritaka (1561–1584); however, he proved to be an unpopular ruler and was assassinated in 1584. The Ashina clan was then defeated by Date Masamune at the Battle of Suriagehara in 1589.

The Date clan was soon relocated from Aizu to Sendai by order of Toyotomi Hideyoshi, and the castle came into the hands of Gamō Ujisato, followed by Uesugi Kagekatsu. Both used the more conveniently located Aizu-Wakamatsu Castle as their main base, and retained Mukaihaguroyama Castle primarily as a final redoubt in case of war. Following the Battle of Sekigahara and the establishment of the Tokugawa shogunate, the Uesugi clan were relocated to Yonezawa Domain, and Mukaihaguroyama Castle was allowed to fall into ruin.

At present, only some remnants of the earthworks and moats remain.

== See also ==
- List of Historic Sites of Japan (Fukushima)

== Literature ==
- Schmorleitz, Morton S. (1974). Castles in Japan. Tokyo: Charles E. Tuttle Co. pp. 144–145. ISBN 0-8048-1102-4.
- Motoo, Hinago (1986). Japanese Castles. Tokyo: Kodansha. p. 200 pages. ISBN 0-87011-766-1.
- Mitchelhill, Jennifer (2004). Castles of the Samurai: Power and Beauty. Tokyo: Kodansha. p. 112 pages. ISBN 4-7700-2954-3.
- Turnbull, Stephen (2003). Japanese Castles 1540-1640. Osprey Publishing. p. 64 pages. ISBN 1-84176-429-9.
