= Nisshinkan =

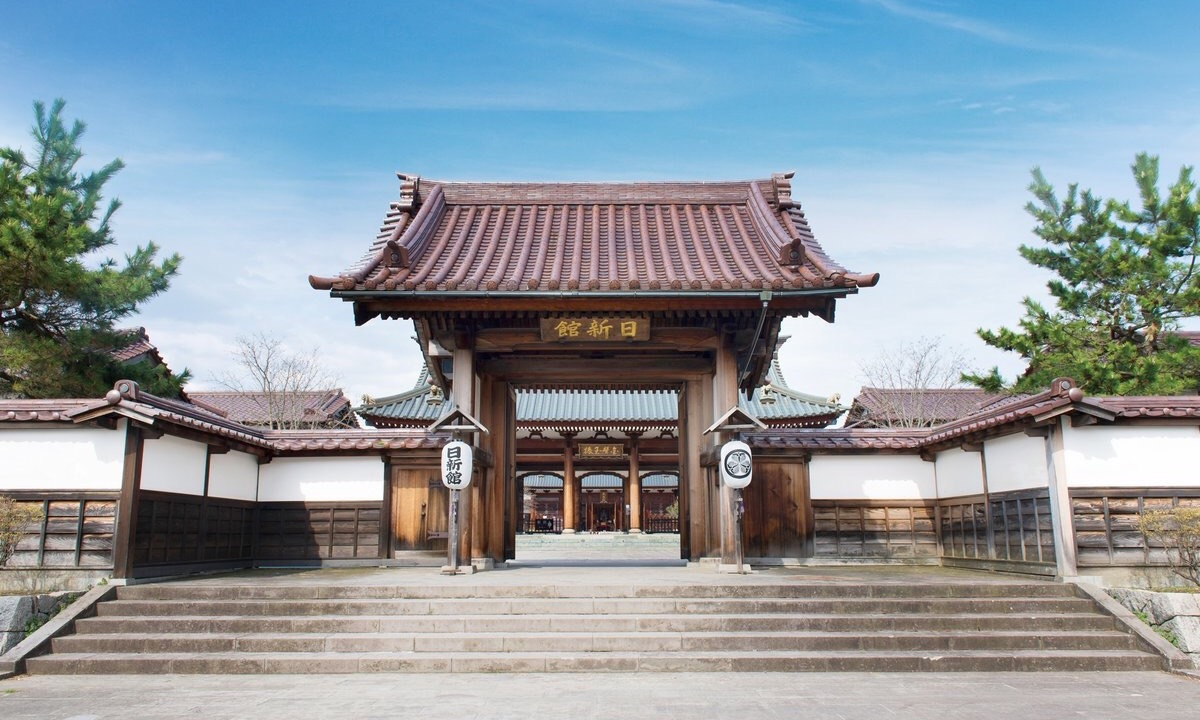
Gate of the Nisshinkan

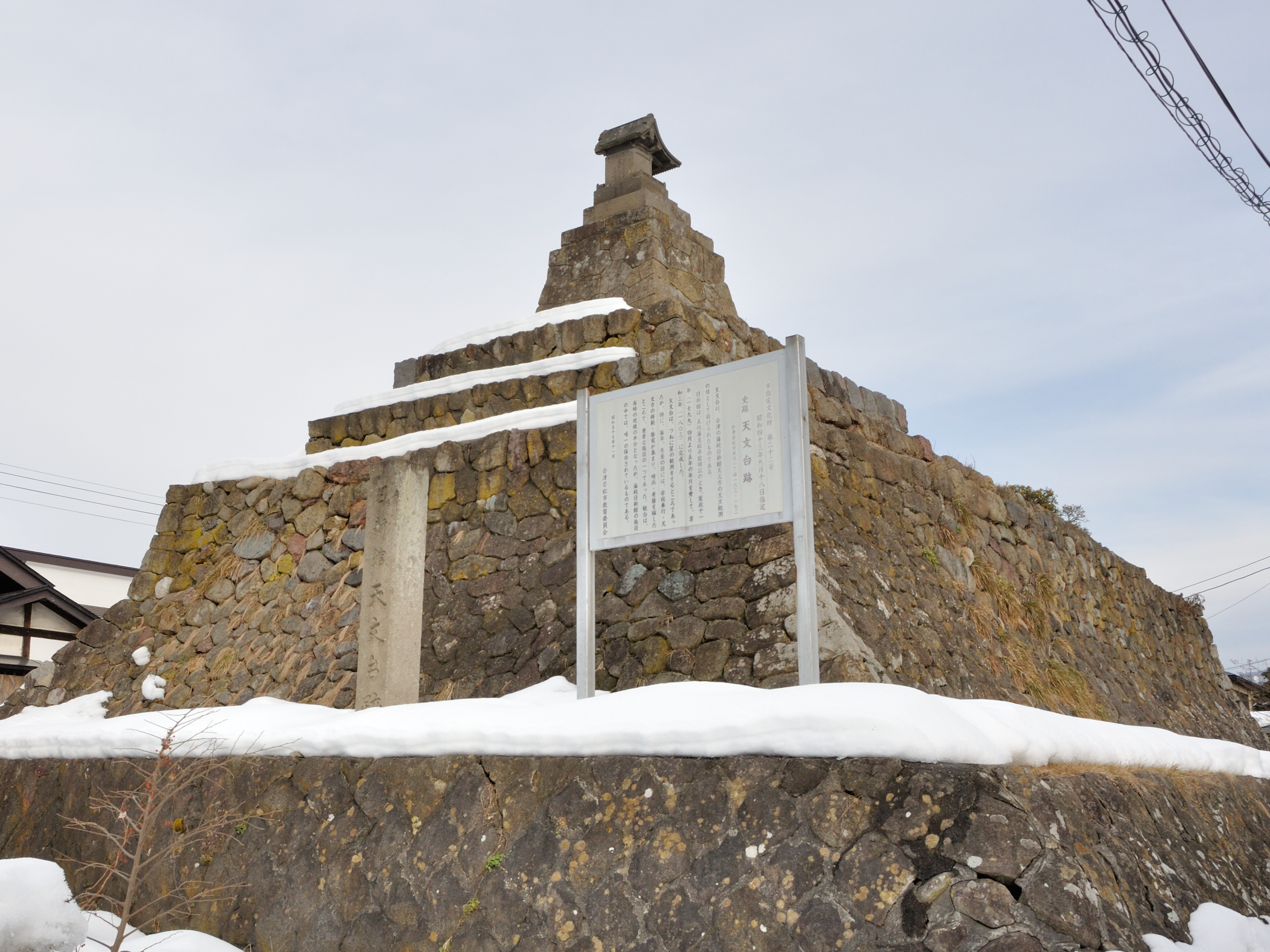
Nissinkan astronomical observatory remains in 2014-01-24

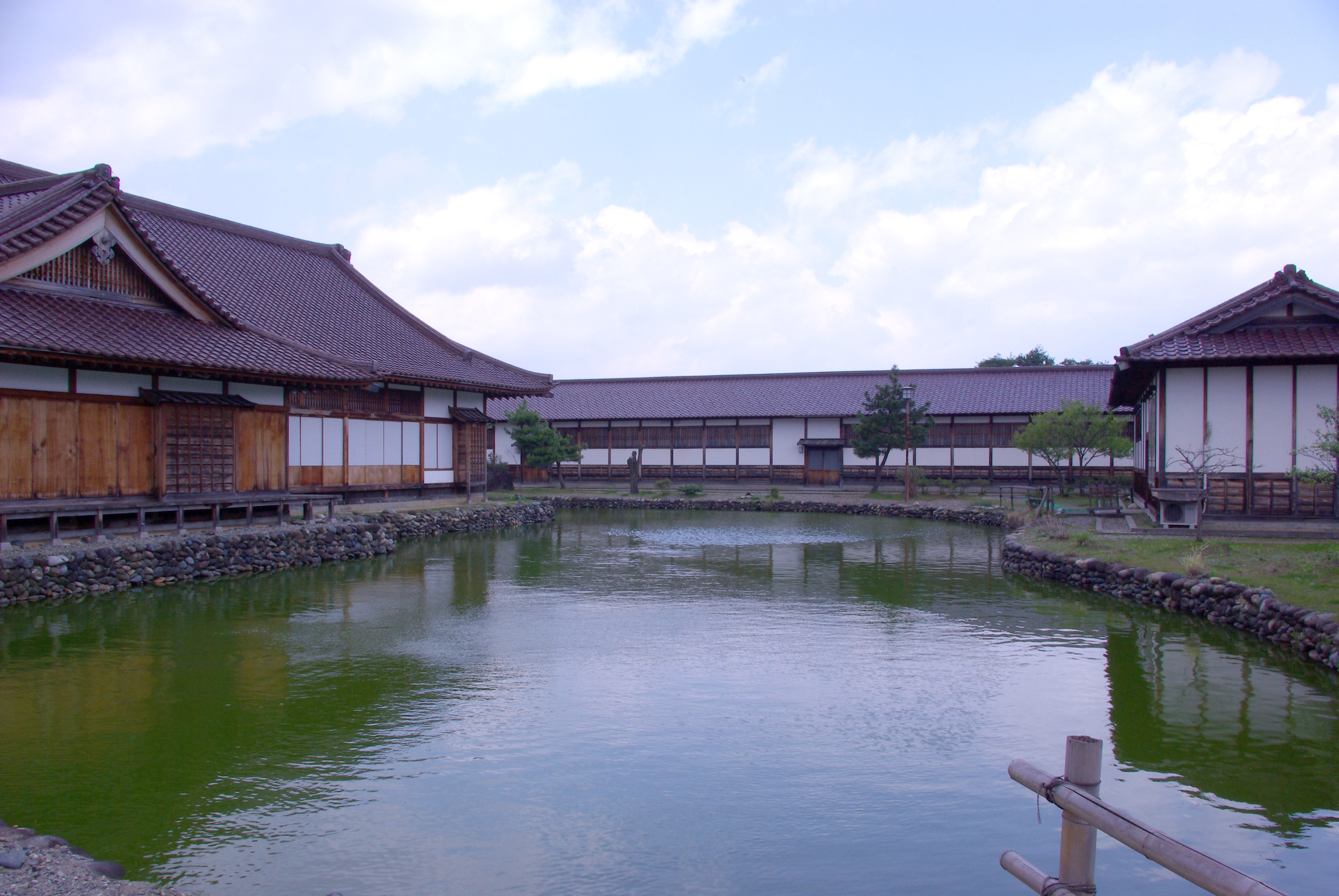
First Swimming Pool in Japan (Nisshinkan)

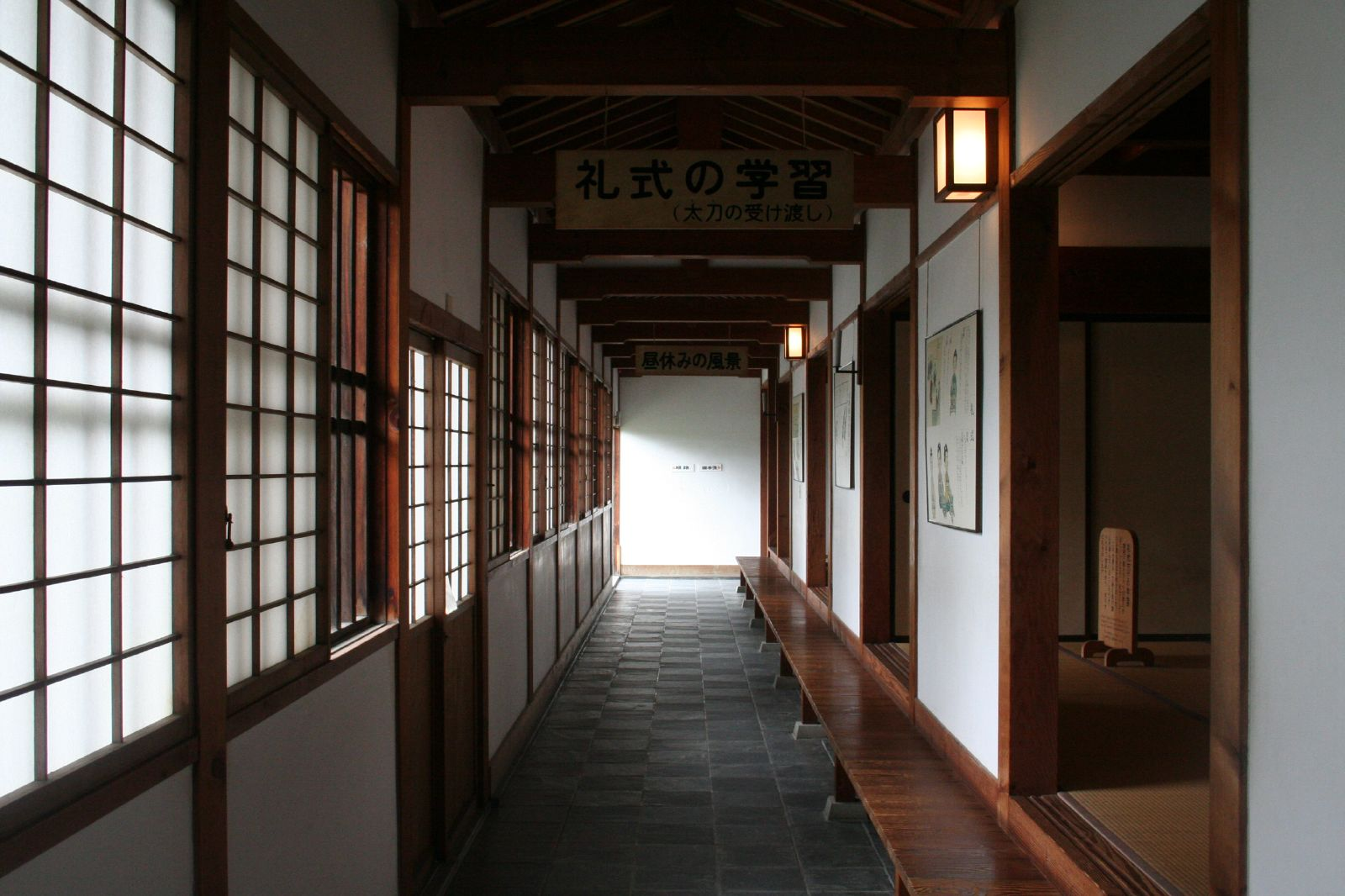
Nishinkan samurai training school corridor

The Nisshinkan (Nisshin-kan) (Japanese: 日新館), located in Aizuwakamatsu, Fukushima, Japan, was the Aizu clan's official domain school (hankō). Established in 1801 and completed in 1803, It was created to educate the sons of high-ranking Samurai. The school's textbook, Nisshinkan dōjikun (Nisshinkan School Injunctions) written by daimyo lord Matsudaira Katanobu in 1803 was read by the students in class and given to the Aizu Samurai's families which allowed girls to be taught from it as well.

== History ==
Aizu hankō Nisshinkan, which takes its name from the term “virtue daily renewed (Japanese: 徳日新) in the Book of Documents, was built as part of The fifth daimyo, lord Matsudaira Katanobu (1744–1805), Aizu domain reform. Construction on the school began in 1798. Most of the funding to build the school was provided by a wealthy kimono merchant. The construction was a community effort. Scholars, students, officials, and other community members worked side by side during the five-years it took to complete. It was located on the west side of Tsurugajo Castle.

Once completed, the campus had an observatory, an area for horseback riding, indoor and outdoor shooting ranges, large and small halls to practice fencing, spear fighting, and man to man combat with and without weapons, a swimming pool, the first in Japan, which they used to practice swimming with and without armor and classrooms.

The school mandate, "to prepare boys for future careers serving Aizu as samurai-administrators", is contained in the Book of Documents. Enrollment remained constant. at around 1000 students, from the time it opened in 1801 until the Boshin war in 1868.

== Destruction ==
Six years after the Boshin War, which was in 1868, Nisshinkan was burned down.

== See also ==
- Byakkotai
- Iimori Hill
- Aizu-Wakamatsu
