= Battle of Suriagehara =

1589 battle in Japan

- Part of Date Masamune's Consolidation of Power in Southern Mutsu
Date	July 17, 1589
Location	Suriagehara, Mutsu Province, Japan (modern day Inawashiro and Bandai in Fukushima Prefecture) 37°33′44″N 140°03′59″E
Result	Decisive Date victory

Belligerents
Date clan Katakura clan Tamura clan Iwaki clan	Ashina clan Satake clan Sōma clan Nikaidō clan

Commanders and leaders
Date Masamune; Date Shigezane; Katakura Kagetsuna; Oniniwa Tsunamoto	Ashina Yoshihiro; Satake Yoshishige; Satake Yoshinobu; Sōma Yoshitane; Onamihime

Strength
23,000	16,000

Casualties and losses
500	1,800
- Location within Fukushima Prefecture Battle of Suriagehara (Japan)

Battle of Suriagehara (摺上原の戦い, Suriagehara no tatakai) was a battle during the Sengoku period (16th century) of Japan. It was fought at a field called Suriagehara, whose modern location is split between the towns of Inawashiro and Bandai in Fukushima Prefecture.

== Background ==
The Battle of Suriagehara served as the aftermath of the Siege of Kurokawa, in which Ashina Yoshihiro with aid from Satake clan and Nikaidō clan, his 16,000 men stole the moment to enact revenge for their previous defeat at Kurokawa Castle.

== Battle ==
Date Masamune, with his superior 23,000 troops, defeated the Ashina. While some Ashina forces withdrew across the Nippashi River to Kurokawa, the bridge gave out amidst their retreat, leaving many Ashina troops to be cut down when the Date forces overtook them. According to the 17th-century text Ōū Eikei Gunki, there were around 500 Ashina troops killed at the Nippashi River alone.

== Aftermath ==
This battle helped seal the Date clan's hegemony over southern Mutsu Province. However, despite the victory, resistance after the battle continued, notably from the pro-Ashina, Nikaidō and Satake clans.

The battle later served as the basis for the Noh play "Suriage". According to local lore, the Tohoku folk song "Sansa Shigure" was written by Masamune in the celebrations following this Date victory.
