= Shinoda =

Shinoda (written: 篠田) is a Japanese surname. Notable persons with the surname Shinoda include:

- Akira Shinoda (篠田 昭; born 1948), Japanese mayor
- Gisaburō Shinoda (篠田 儀三郎; 1852 – 1868), Japanese samurai
- Junpei Shinoda (篠田 純平; born 1985), Japanese baseball player
- Kenichi Shinoda (篠田 建市; born 1942), Japanese yakuza
- Larry Shinoda (1930 – 1997), American automotive designer
- Mariko Shinoda (篠田 麻里子; born 1986), Japanese idol singer
- Masahiro Shinoda (篠田 正浩; 1931–2025), Japanese film director
- Masami Shinoda (篠田 昌已; 1958–1992), Japanese alto saxophonist
- Miho Shinoda (信田 美帆; born 1972), Japanese gymnast, singer and sports trainer
- Mike Shinoda (篠田 賢治; born 1977), American musician
- Mitsuyoshi Shinoda (篠田 光亮; born 1981), Japanese actor
- Setsuko Shinoda (篠田 節子; born 1955), Japanese author
- Toko Shinoda (篠田 桃紅; born 1913), Japanese ink-painter
- Yoshiyuki Shinoda (篠田 善之; born 1971), Japanese football player
- Yōsuke Shinoda (篠田 陽介; born 1973), Japanese politician

== See also ==
- Shinoda test for flavonoids
