= Iinuma Sadakichi =

Japanese samurai (1854-1931)

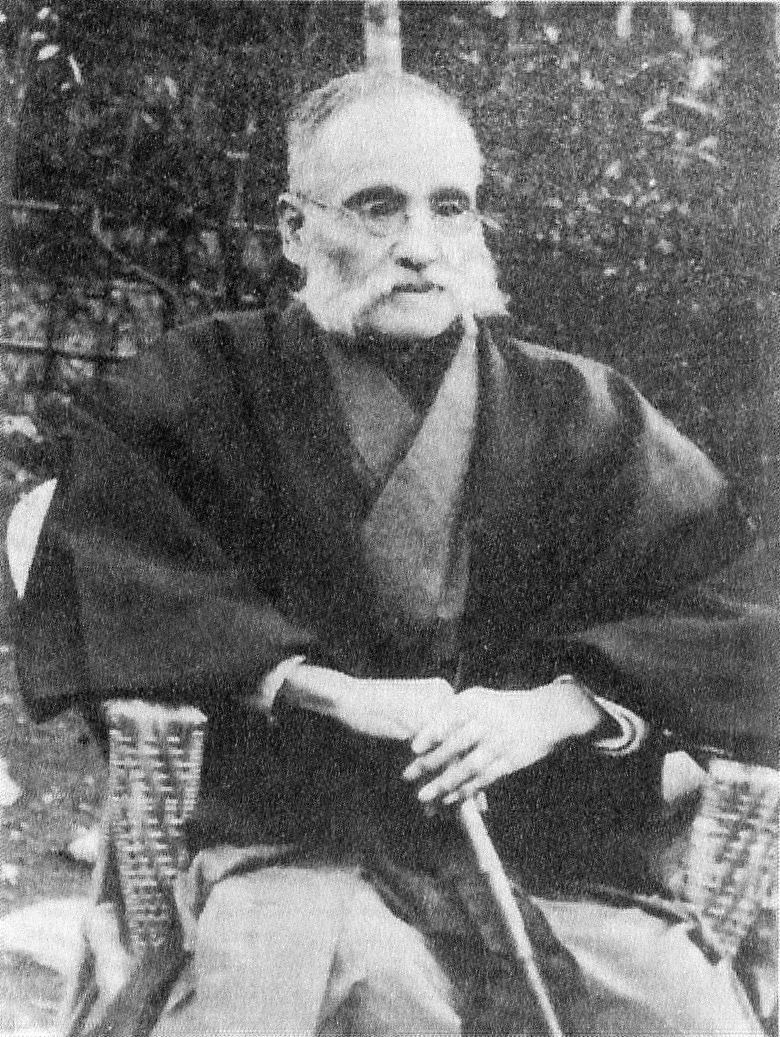
- Born: April 22, 1854; Aizu, Mutsu Province, Tokugawa shogunate
- Died: February 12, 1931 (aged 76); Sendai, Miyagi Prefecture, Japan
- Occupations: Aizu retainer; Imperial Japanese Army officer

Iinuma Sadakichi (飯沼 貞吉; April 22, 1854 – February 12, 1931) was a Japanese military officer of the Imperial Japanese Army and former member of the Byakkotai of the Aizu Domain.

== History ==
He lied about his age to join the military, and was assigned to the Byakkotai division - essentially a reserve division of young teenagers only meant to be deployed in emergency. He was the sole survivor of group after the Byakkotai committed suicide on Iimori Hill during the Battle of Aizu. Iimori Hill overlooked the Aizuwakamatsu Castle and they thought the flames meant their lord Matsudaira Katamori and families were deceased. Thus they committed seppuku to demonstrate defiance. The events were not widely known at the time due to the victorious Imperial army not wishing to glorify rebels.

After the war Sadakichi relocated to Sendai. He served in the Ministry of Communications and Imperial Japanese Army. He only related the incident much later as an older man, after the tensions of the Boshin War had cooled. It is through him that the events of the Byakkotai suicide at Iimori are known.

After his death, his ashes were spread on Mount Iimori together on the buried graves of his Byakkotai comrades.
