= Shinoda Gisaburō =

Samurai (1852–1868)

Shinoda Gisaburō (篠田 儀三郎; 1852 – October 8, 1868) was a Japanese samurai of the late Edo period who served the Matsudaira clan of Aizu. He was the leader of a detachment of Byakkotai troops who got separated from their main unit, and arrived at the top of Iimori Hill. From Iimori Hill they thought they saw Tsuruga Castle on fire, and committed suicide in despair.
