= Ikeda Sueo =

Japanese military personnel

- 池田 末男
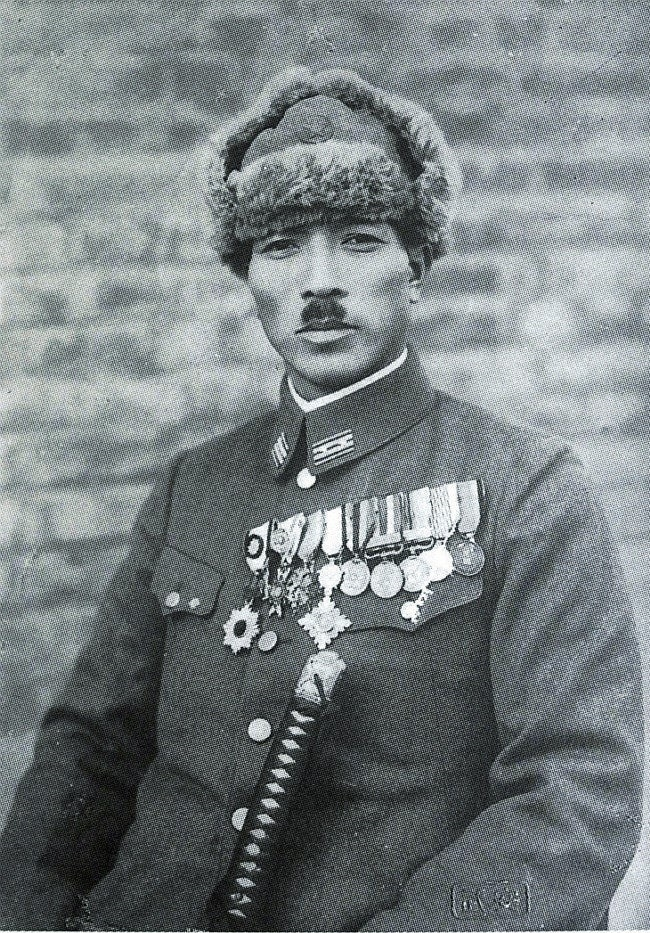
- Born: December 21, 1900; Toyohashi, Aichi Prefecture, Japan
- Died: August 18, 1945 (aged 44); Shumshu, Hokkaidō, Japan
- Military career
- Branch: Imperial Japanese Army
- Service years: 1922–1945
- Rank: Major general (少将, shōshō)
- Conflicts: Second Sino-Japanese War; Second World War; Soviet invasion of the Kuril Islands; Battle of Shumshu †

Ikeda Sueo (Japanese: 池田 末男; December 21, 1900 – August 18, 1945) was a Japanese Army officer. He died defending Shumshu during the Soviet invasion of the Kuril Islands in 1945.

== Biography ==
Ikeda was born in Toyohashi. He graduated from the Imperial Japanese Army Academy in 1922. In 1941, he was appointed as a tank instructor to the Manchukuo Imperial Army in Gongzhuling.

In December 1944, Ikeda was appointed commander of the 11th Armored Regiment of the 91st Division stationed on Shumshu. Because the Sea of Japan was by then infested with American submarines, Ikeda had to travel by a circuitous route. On January 22, 1945, he landed on Paramushir and reported to Lt. Gen. Tsutsumi Fusaki, commander of the 91st Division before finally crossing to Shumshu.

On August 7, 1945, the Soviet Union suddenly repudiated the Soviet–Japanese Neutrality Pact — which was valid until April 1946 — and declared war on Japan, planning to seize Karafuto and the Kuril Islands.

Following the surrender of Japan on August 15, the 11th Armored Regiment had begun preparations for demobilization. However, on August 18, after thousands of Soviet troops began amphibious landings on Shumshu, Ikeda received orders from Lt. Gen. Fusaki to "advance rapidly [...] and annihilate the enemy".

Ikeda's regiment was heavily outnumbered and equipped with only 25 light tanks. Before engaging the Soviets, Ikeda delivered the following address to the troops under his command:

We have devoted ourselves to the tasks following the war's end, holding onto the hope that we might one day return home in obedience to the Imperial Command. Yet we have reached this crucial juncture, and there is now no choice left but to wield the sword that destroys evil. I therefore put this question to you: Will you be like the Akō rōnin — enduring humiliation now to exact vengeance upon the enemy in the future? Or will you be like the Byakkotai — serving as a bulwark for the nation by facing a heroic death, and leaving [your sacrifice as] a question to history? Those who would be Akō rōnin, step forward. Those who would be Byakkotai, raise your hands.

Everyone present raised their hands immediately. In the ensuing Battle of Shumshu, Ikeda died defending a Japanese position on Mt. Shirei (四嶺山). The Japanese defenders were able to inflict heavy casualties on the Soviets, but the latter were armed with white phosphorus munitions which quickly destroyed the small and outdated Japanese tanks. Waves of Soviet troops then overran the Japanese positions on Mt. Shirei. The remains of Ikeda and his driver were found, partially incinerated, inside a burnt-out tank. Burns on their bodies indicated that they and had continued fighting while the inside of the vehicle was on fire.

== See also ==
- Yamasaki Yasuyo
