= Siege of Kurokawa Castle =

- Part of Date supremacy over Ashina
| Date | 1589 |
| Location | Kurokawa Castle, Fukushima Prefecture |
| Result | Date victory |

Belligerents
| Date clan | Ashina clan |

Commanders and leaders
| Date Masamune | Ashina Yoshihiro |

The siege of Kurokawa Castle was a battle during the Azuchi–Momoyama period (16th century) of Japan. Date Masamune besieged Kurokawa Castle against Ashina clan.

Following the assassination of Date Masamune cousin, Ashina Moritaka in 1584, and the death of Ashina Kameomaru, son of Moritaka in 1586, Ashina Yoshihiro, was chosen to inherit the leadership of the Ashina clan.

After Date Masamune attacked Nihonmatsu at Battle of Koriyama in 1588, the sons of Nihonmatsu Yoshitsugu set the Koriyama castle on fire and fled to Ashina clan at Kurokawa Castle. Date Masamune, who had been a rival of the Ashina clan for many years, seized the chance to invade the territories of the Ashina clan. Masamune took the Kurokawa Castle with little effort. Many vassals under the Ashina clan, inclusive of Inawashiro Morikuni, defected to the Date clan.
