= Akira Shinoda =

Japanese mayor

- 篠田 昭

Mayor of Niigata
- In office 18 November 2002 – 17 November 2018
- Preceded by: Yoshiaki Hasegawa
- Succeeded by: Yaichi Nakahara

Personal details
- Born: 17 July 1948 (age 78) Chūō-ku, Niigata, Japan
- Party: Independent
- Education: Sophia University

Akira Shinoda (篠田 昭, Shinoda Akira; born 17 July 1948) is a Japanese politician who served as the mayor of Niigata City in Japan. He was first elected in 2002 and retired in 2018. He was succeeded by Yaichi Nakahara.

== Early life and career ==
Shinoda was born and raised in Niigata City (present day Chūō-ku) his family ran a ryokan (a traditional Japanese inn). Shinoda attended Niigata Elementary School, Niigata Junior High School, Niigata High School, and graduated from the Department of Russian Studies in the Faculty of Foreign Studies at Sophia University in Tokyo.

After graduating from Sophia University, he joined the Niigata Nippo newspaper company in April 1972 in his hometown. There, he served in various positions including editorial writer, head of the Culture Department and News Department of the editorial bureau, head of the News Department at the Nagaoka branch office, and editorial board member.

In September 2002, he left Niigata Nippo. In November of the same year, he ran as an independent politician as a candidate in the Niigata mayoral election and won his first term as mayor. He was re-elected in the 2006 and 2010 Niigata mayoral elections.

In 2012, he was awarded the Order of merit of Chevalier of the Legion of Honour by France.

Although he initially denied any intention of running for a fourth term as mayor, he later reversed his decision and announced his candidacy. He won a fourth term in the election held on November 9, 2014.

On July 23, 2018, he announced that he would not run in the next election, and held a press conference the following day. Explaining his retirement from politics, he stated: “In order to further revitalize the city, I decided it should be entrusted to a new leader.” Just before announcing his decision not to run, however, he had also said that he “might consider running depending on how the political landscape developed.”

In the Spring 2021 Imperial Decorations, he was awarded the Order of the Rising Sun, Gold Rays with Neck Ribbon.
