= Ashna (disambiguation) =

Ashna may refer to:

== People ==
=== Surname ===
- Hesamodin Ashna, Iranian politician presidential advisor
- Hossein Ashena, Iranian footballer

=== Given name ===
- Ashna Zaveri, Indian actress

== Places ==
- Ashna, Khonj, a village in Iran

== See also ==
- Ashina (disambiguation)
