= Sesson Shukei =

Japanese monk and artist (1504 – c. 1589)

Sesson Shūkei 雪村周継
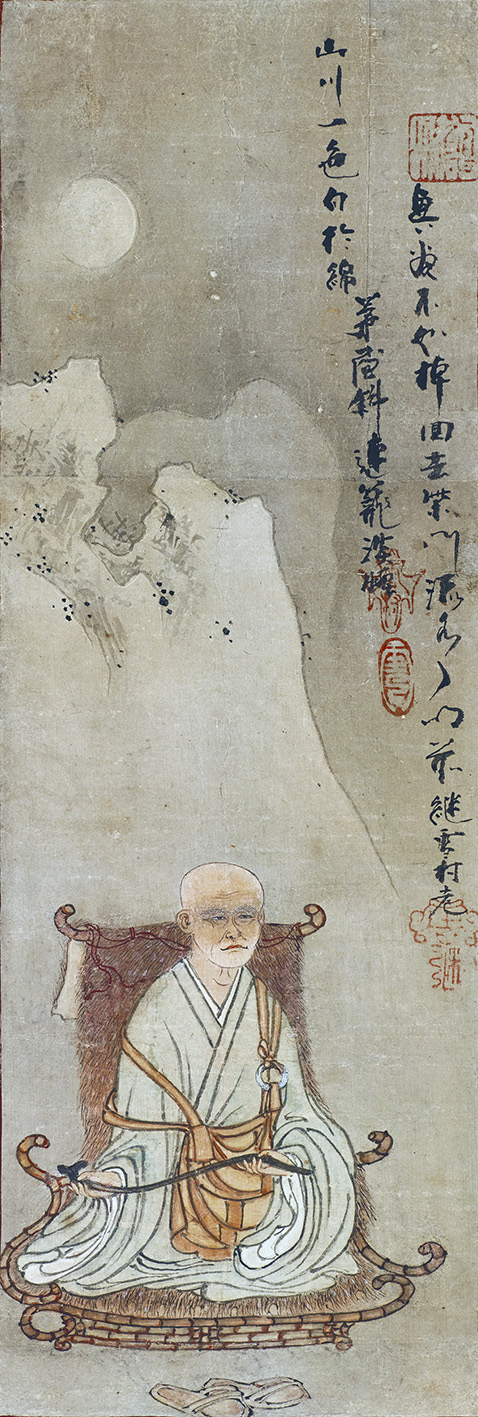
- Self-portrait (ICP) (Yamato Bunkakan)
- Born: 1504; Hitachi, Japan
- Died: c. 1589; Iwashiro, Japan
- Known for: Painting
- Movement: Suiboku

Sesson Shūkei (Japanese: 雪村周継; 1504 – c. 1589), born Satake Heizō (Japanese: 佐竹平蔵) was a Japanese Zen monk and painter from the Muromachi period.

Shūkei was born a member of the Satake clan, but left after being disinherited by his father and was inducted as a monk at Shōsō-ji temple, the Satake bodaiji. He is the most important painter who followed the style of Sesshū Tōyō (1420-1506). On the other hand, there is a different opinion (jp) that he was not influenced or affected by Sesshū although he paid his respects to Sesshū (雪舟) by using the same Kanji, 雪 which means snow, in his name, Sesson (雪村). In any case Sesson was the master of ink painting that Ibaraki Prefecture has ever produced, ranked with Sesshū and called "Sesshū of the west, Sesson of the east". His works are the classic examples of Japanese ink painting which was imported via many artists from China. He produced many landscapes such as Eight Views of Xiaoxiang and fictional characters such as Hama Xianren, Li Tieguai and Lü Dongbin

He travelled to Aizu at least twice to give lessons in painting to the daimyō Ashina Moriuji – first in 1546, and then again in 1561 after Moriuki's retirement.

== Gallery ==
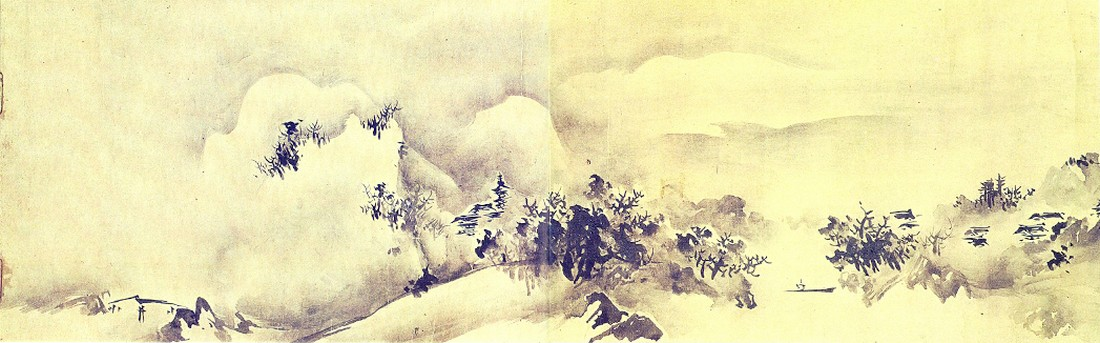
Landscape of the Hsiao-Hsiang

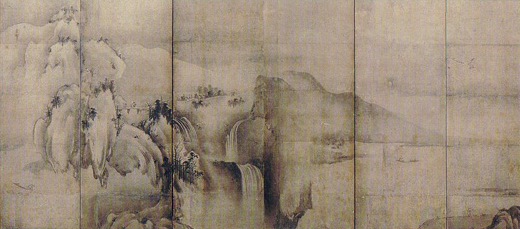
Landscape of the Four Seasons

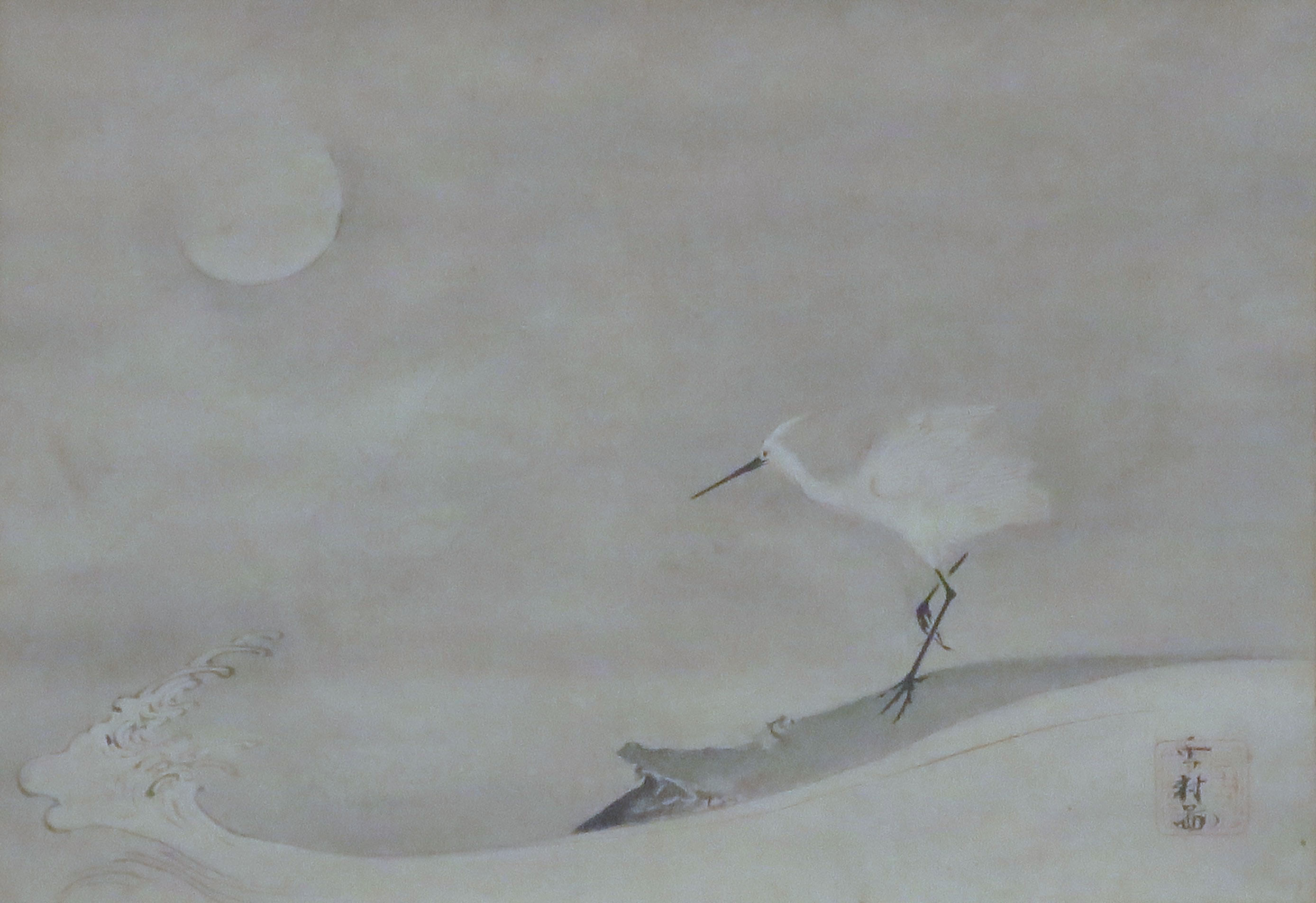
Egret, Moon, and Wave

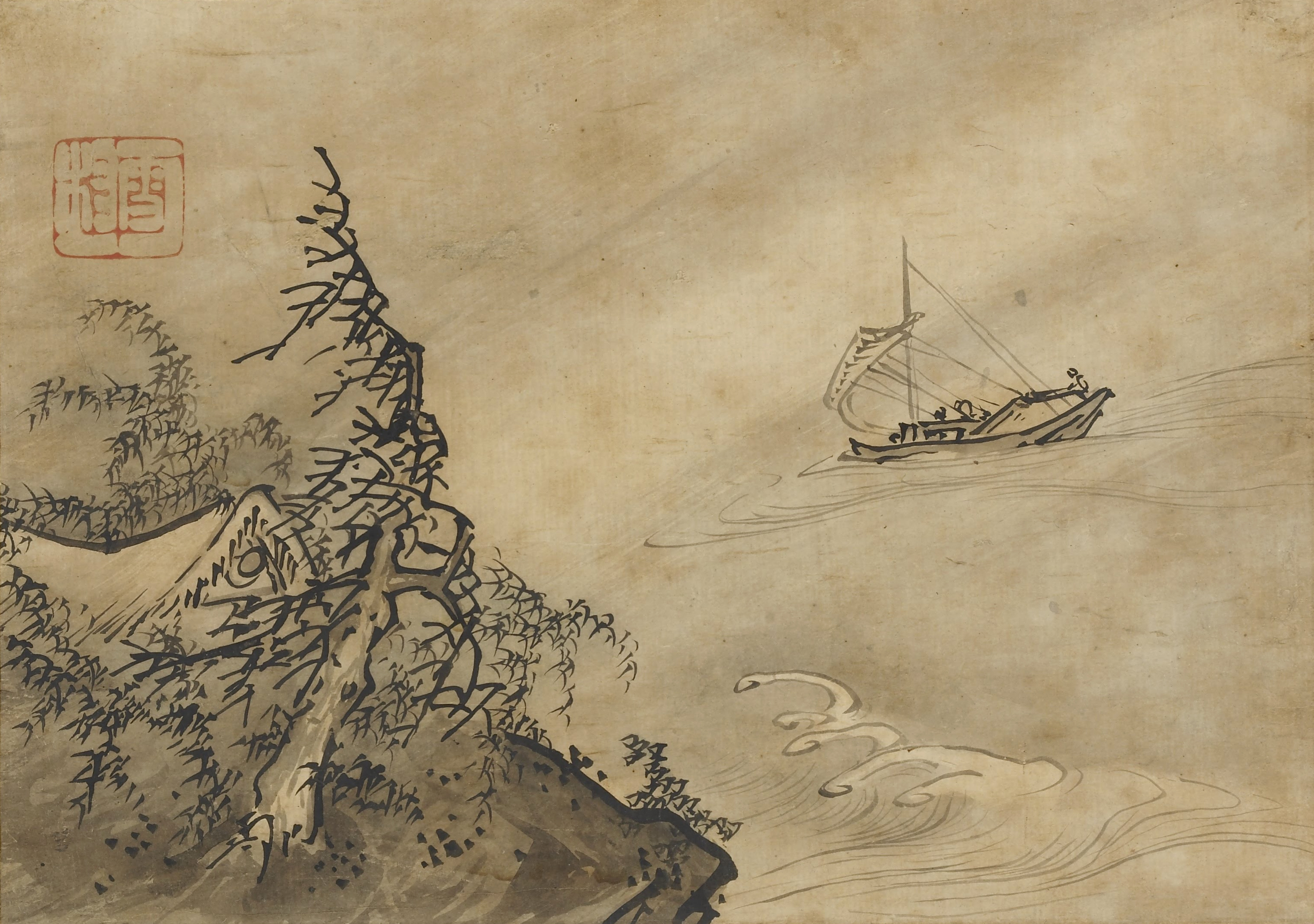
Tempest

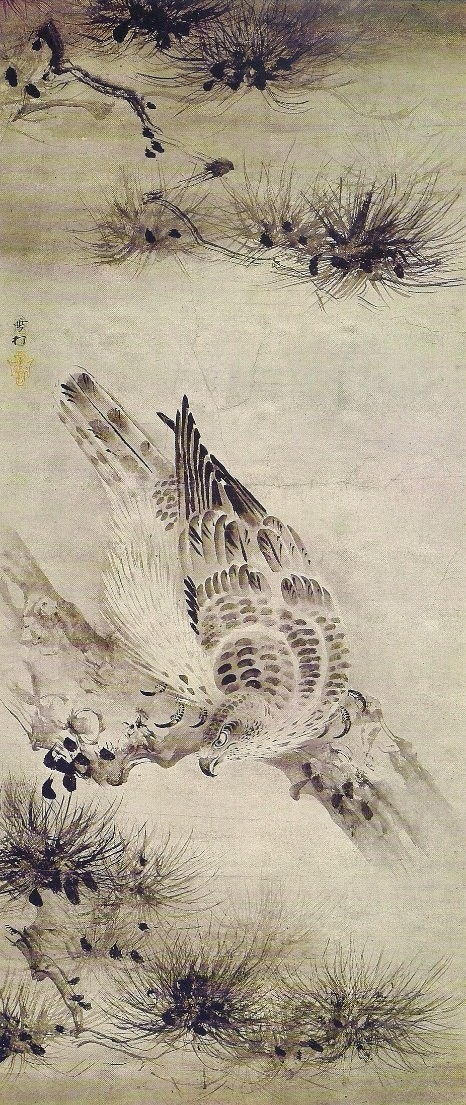
Falcon Under a Pine

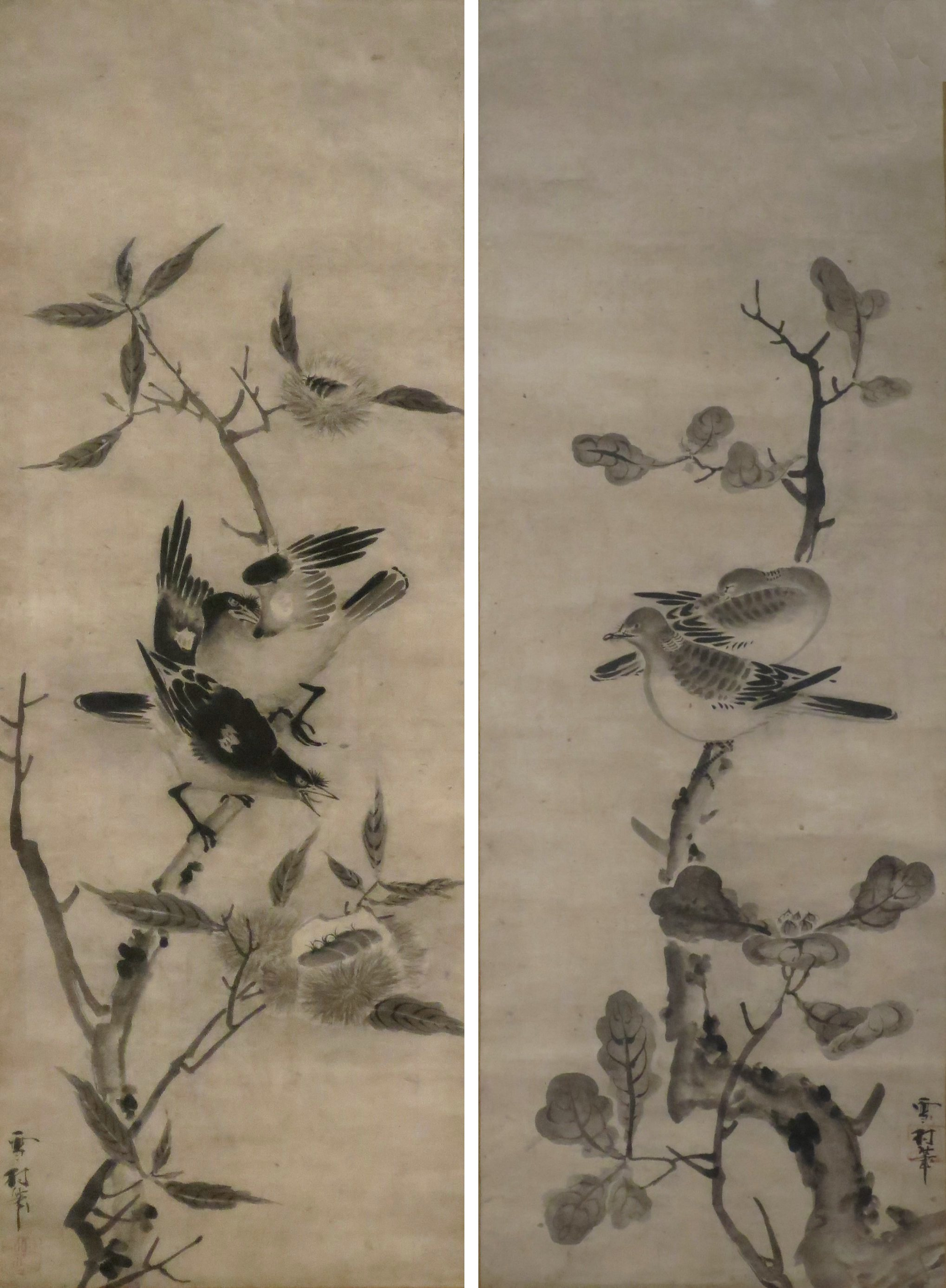
Mynah Birds and Pigeons

== Literature ==
- Frank Feltens, Yukio Lippit (Eds.): Sesson Shukei. A Zen Monk-Painter in Medieval Japan, Hirmer publishers, Munich 2021, ISBN 978-3-7774-3633-3.
