= Ashina Morikiyo =

Japanese daimyō

Ashina Morikiyo (蘆名 盛舜, 1490 – November 21, 1553) was a Japanese daimyō of the Sengoku period, who was the head of the Ashina clan.

== Family ==
- Great-great-great-great-great-grandfather: Ashina Morimune
- Great-great-great-great-grandfather: Ashina Naomori (1323–1391)
- Great-great-great-grandfather: Ashina Norimori (1346–1407)
- Great-great-grandfather: Ashina Morimune (1386–1434)
- Great-grandfather: Ashina Morinobu (1408–1451)
- Grandfather: Ashina Moriakira (1431–1466)
- Grandmother: Daughter of Miura Takaaki
- Father: Ashina Moritaka (1448–1518)
- Mother: daughter of Uesugi Fusasada
- Wife: daughter of Kanagami Morioki
- Concubine: Kawano Gozen
- Children:
  - Ashina Moriuji (1521–1580) by daughter of Kanagami Morioki
  - Ashina Ujikata (1516–1561) by Kawano Gozen
  - Daughter married Horiuchi Chikatane
