= Nihonmatsu Shonentai =

The Nihonmatsu Shōnentai (二本松少年隊; literally "Nihonmatsu Youth Corps") was a group of around 62 samurai of the Nihonmatsu Domain, aged between 12 and 17, who fought in the Boshin War.

== History ==
Although the roster lists 62 members, a subset of 20 remain famous due to their naming in the unsuccessful defence of Nihonmatsu Castle in 1868, under the command of Kimura Jūtarō. Sixteen of these, including Kimura, died in the defence.

== See also ==
・Nihonmatsu Castle

・Byakkotai(百虎隊)
