= Nikaidō clan =

Nikaidō 二階堂
- The emblem (mon) of the Nikaidō clan
- Home province: Mutsu; Mino
- Parent house: Fujiwara clan
- Founder: Nikaidō Yukimasa

Nikaidō clan (二階堂氏, Nikaidō-shi) is a Japanese samurai kin group.

== History ==
The Nikaidō claim descent from Fujiwara no Yukimasa who was the first to take the Nikaidō name.

The clan ruled over the Iwase District of Mutsu Province during the Sengoku period. Sukagawa Castle was their main residence.

== Gifu Castle ==
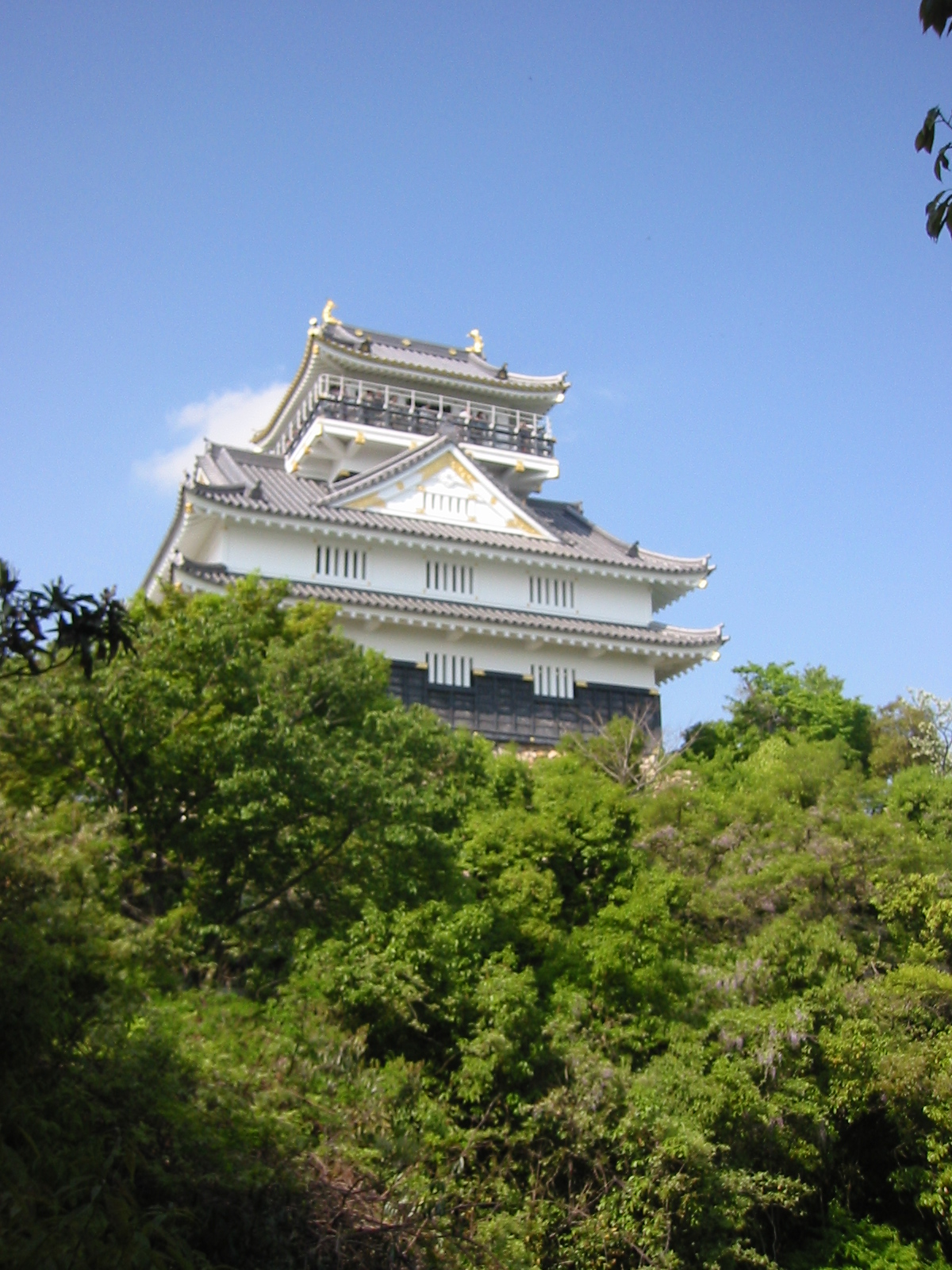
Gifu Castle

During the Kamakura period, the clan's power stretched down to Mino Province, where they constructed Inabayama Castle atop Mount Inaba between 1201 and 1204.

== Clan heads ==
1. Nikaidō Yukimasa (二階堂行政)
2. Nikaidō Tameuji (二階堂為氏)
3. Nikaidō Yukimitsu (二階堂行光)
4. Nikaidō Yukiaki (二階堂行詮)
5. Nikaidō Yukikage (二階堂行景)
6. Nikaidō Haruyuki (二階堂晴行) (died July 2, 1542)
7. Nikaidō Teruyuki (二階堂照行) (died October 22, 1564)
8. Nikaidō Moriyoshi (二階堂盛義) (1544 – September 23, 1581)
9. Nikaidō Yukichika (二階堂行親) (1570–1582)
10. Onamihime (阿南姫) (1541 – August 30, 1602)

== Notable retainers and family ==
- Suda Morihide (須田盛秀) (1530–1625)
- Suda Hidehiro (須田秀広) (1572–1589)
- Suda Yoritaka (須田頼隆) (died May 27, 1590)
- Yadano Yoshimasa (箭田野義正) (1565–1623)
- Nikaidō Yukihide (二階堂行栄) (born 1581)
- Suda Teruhide (須田照秀)
- Suda Hideyuki (須田秀行)
- Nikaidō Tsugutsuna (二階堂続綱)
- Nikaidō Terushige (二階堂照重)
- Nikaidō Terutsuna (二階堂照綱)
- Nikaidō Yukinao (二階堂行直) (died 1348)
- Ōkubo Sukechika (大久保資近)
- Hamao Yukiyasu (浜尾行泰) (1543–1623)
- Hamao Moriyasu (浜尾盛泰)
- Hamao Muneyasu (浜尾宗泰) or Kawashima Muneyasu (川島宗泰)
- Moriya Shigekiyo (守谷重清)
- Moriya Toshishige (守谷俊重)
- Yadano Yukiyoshi (箭田野行義)
- Yadano Yukimasa (箭田野行政) (1524–1583)
- Yadano Yukimasa (箭田野行正)
- Hodowara Yukiari (保土原行有)
- Hodowara Yukifuji (保土原行藤) (1538–1620)
- Hodowara Shigeyuki (保土原重行)
- Endō Moritane (遠藤盛胤)
- Endō Katsushige (遠藤勝重)
- Yabe Yoshimasa (矢部義政)
- Shioda Masashige (塩田政繁)
