= Niigata High School =

Coordinates: 37°54′55.4″N 139°1′24.1″E

- 新潟県立新潟高等学校
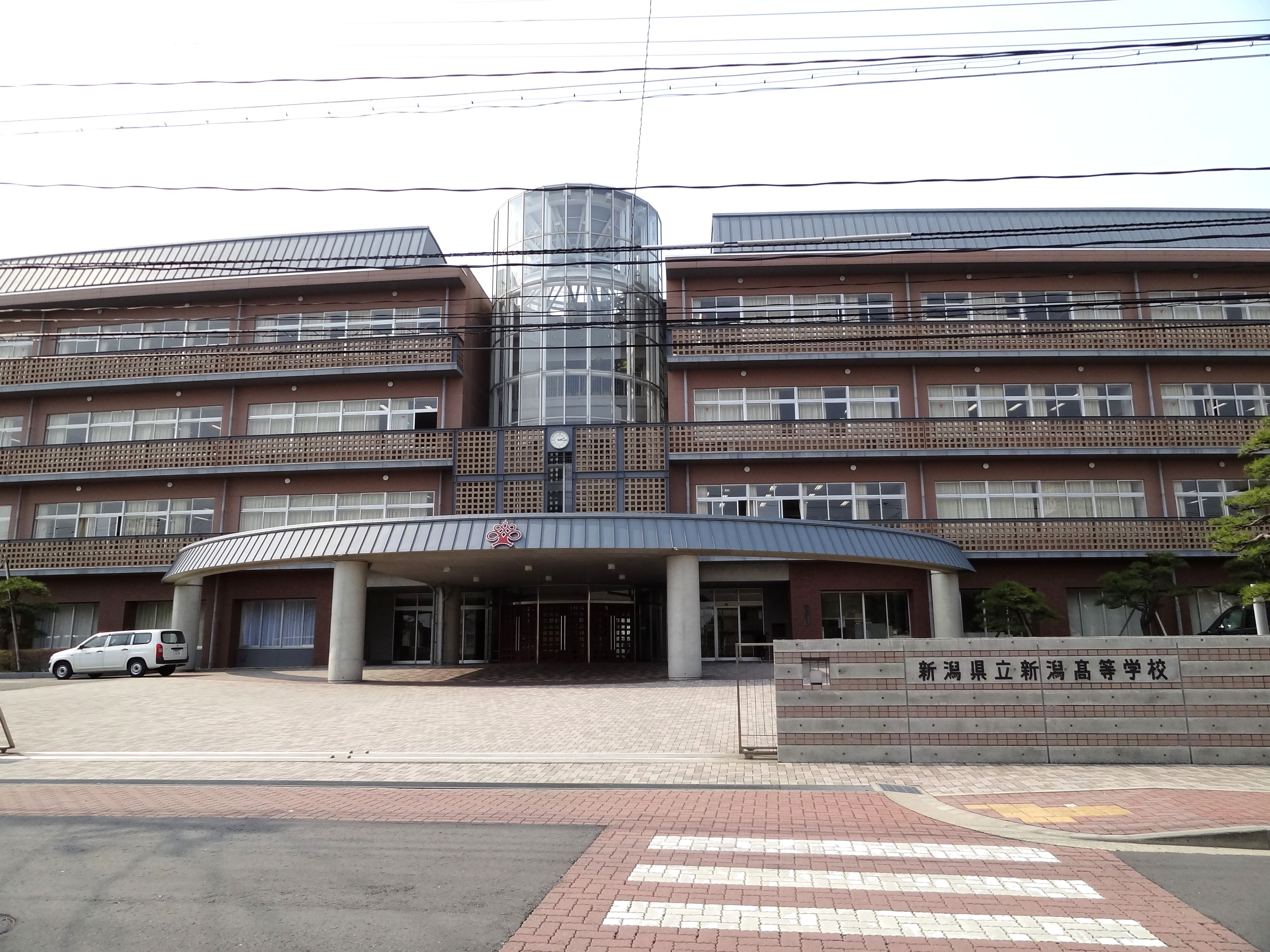
- The main entrance in April 2011
- Chūō-ku, Niigata, Niigata Prefecture; Japan

Information
- Type: Senior high school
- Established: July 1, 1892
- School code: 15101H
- Grades: Senior high school grades 1-3
- Website: Official website

Niigata High School (新潟県立新潟高等学校, Niigata Kenritsu Niigata Kōtō Gakkō) is a senior high school in the city of Niigata, Niigata Prefecture, Japan. It is also called Kentaka (県高).
