= Iimori Mountain =

Mountain in Fukushima prefecture, Japan

- Location within Japan

Highest point
- Elevation: 314 m (1,030 ft)
- Coordinates: 37°30′13.4″N 139°57′21.5″E

Naming
- Native name: 飯盛山 (Japanese)

Geography
- Location: Honshu, Japan

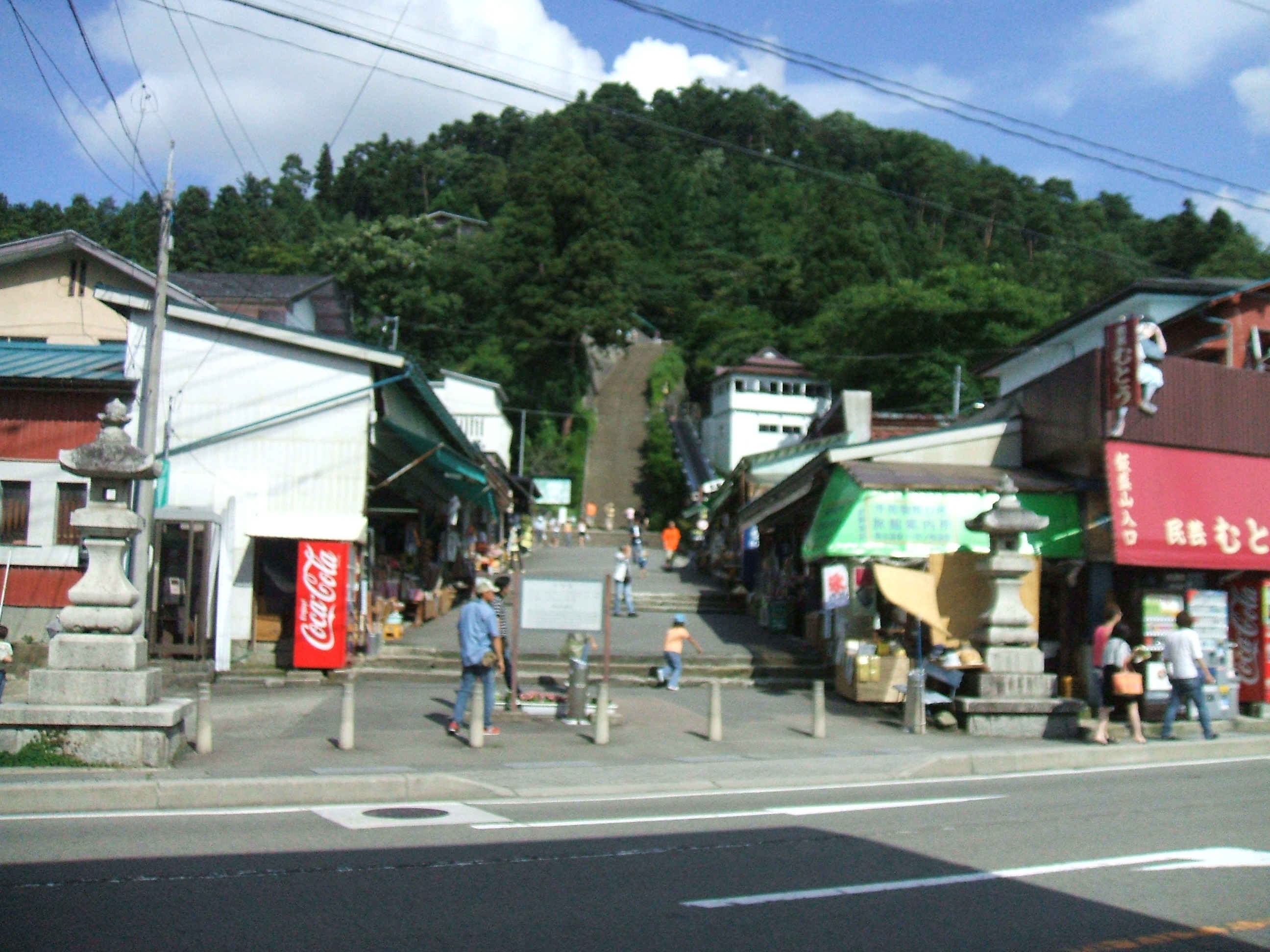
Iimori Mountain

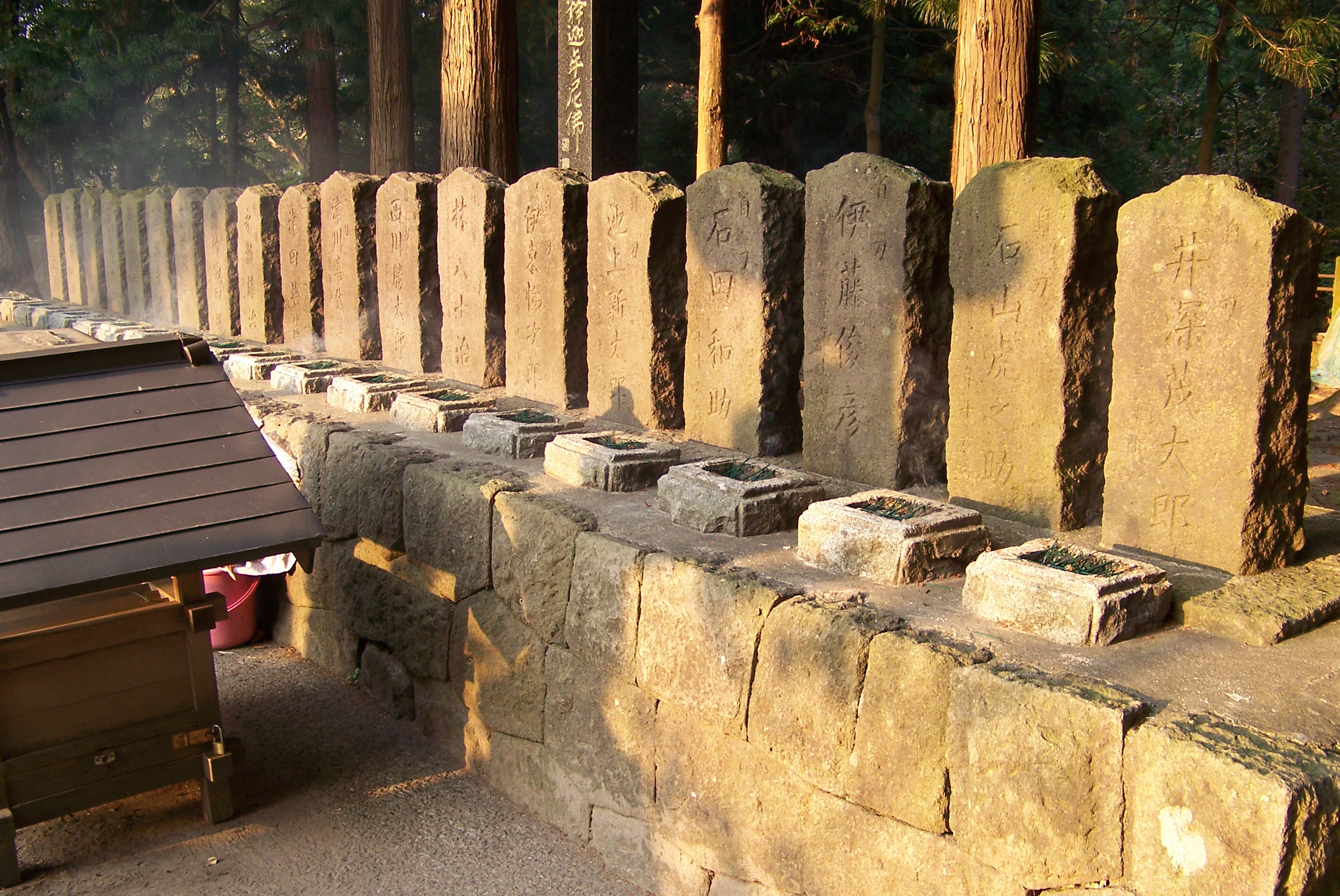
Gravestones of Byakkotai Warriors

Iimori Mountain (飯盛山, Iimori Yama) is a mountain near the city of Aizuwakamatsu, Fukushima Prefecture, Japan. It is notable as the site where members of the Byakkotai (White Tiger Corps) committed ritual suicide in 1868, during the Boshin War. It is located about 1.5 kilometers northeast of Tsuruga Castle.

There are two monuments at the top of the mountain: one was a gift from the Italian Fascist Party in 1928, and the other was from Nazi Germany. They were installed to show reverence for the Byakkotai spirit. After the surrender of Japan at the end of World War II, members of the Occupation, specifically of the U.S. Army, replaced the swastika on the German monument with an iron cross.

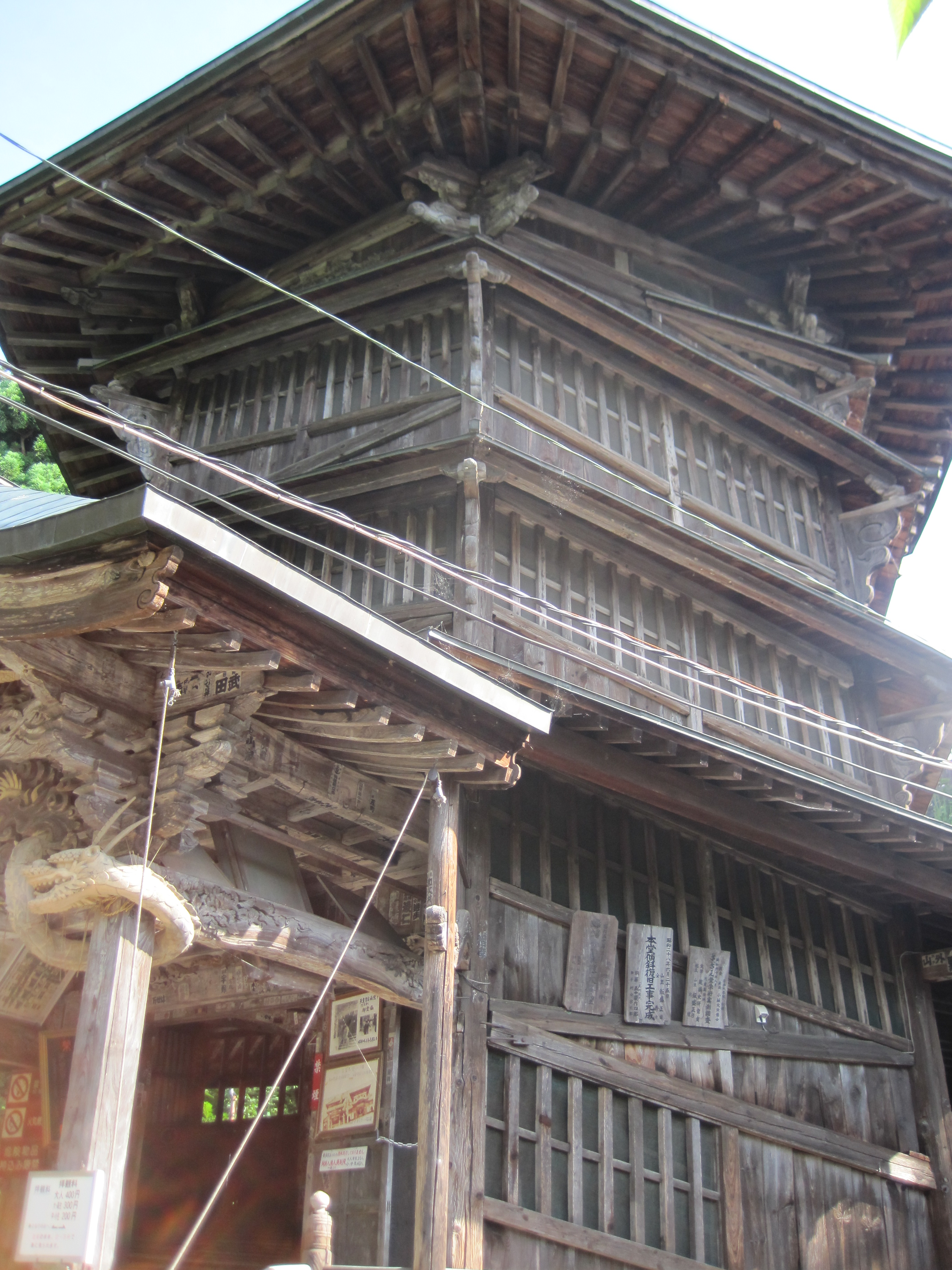
Sazae-dō

Iimori Mountain has been heavily commercialized and the site includes many souvenir shops and exhibitions. The staircases from the foot of the mountain to the top are fairly steep, though there is an escalator. Downhill from Iimori Mountain stands Sazae-dō (さざえ堂), a hexagonal wooden pagoda built in the 18th century, which formerly sealed 33 statues of a Buddhist goddess. The statues were removed in accordance with the Shinbutsu bunri policy during the Meiji period (1868–1912). Another shrine at the site is Uga-shindō (宇賀神堂), near Sazae-dō, which was built during the late 17th century and deifies a white snake as a god of abundance and fertility.

== See also ==
- Byakkotai
- Nisshinkan
- Aizu-Wakamatsu
