= Ashina Moritaka =

- 蘆名 盛隆
- Born: Nikaido Heishiro; 1561
- Died: November 8, 1584 (aged 22–23); Kurokawa Castle
- Cause of death: Assassination
- Relatives: Nikaidō Moriyoshi (father); Onamihime (mother)

Ashina Moritaka (蘆名 盛隆; 1561 – November 8, 1584) was a Japanese samurai and lord of Kurokawa Castle (Aizu Castle) in the early Sengoku period. He was the lord of the Ashina (Sawara) family. He is also known as Heitarō (平太郎).

Moritaka was born as Nikaido Heishiro, the son of Nikaidō Moriyoshi (二階堂 盛義) and Onamihime. He was adopted by Ashina Morioki to continue the family line, and as per that arrangement, married Morioki's daughter and had a son, Kiōmaru. After Moritaka's succession, he, became very unpopular among his retainers. This led to his assassination at the hands of Ōba Sanzaemon (大庭 三左衛門) in Kurokawa Castle. Ashina Yoshihiro would become Moritaka's successor because his own son, Kiōmaru, had died at the age of 2.
