= Byakkotai =

Military unit in the Boshin War (1868–1869)

- 白虎隊
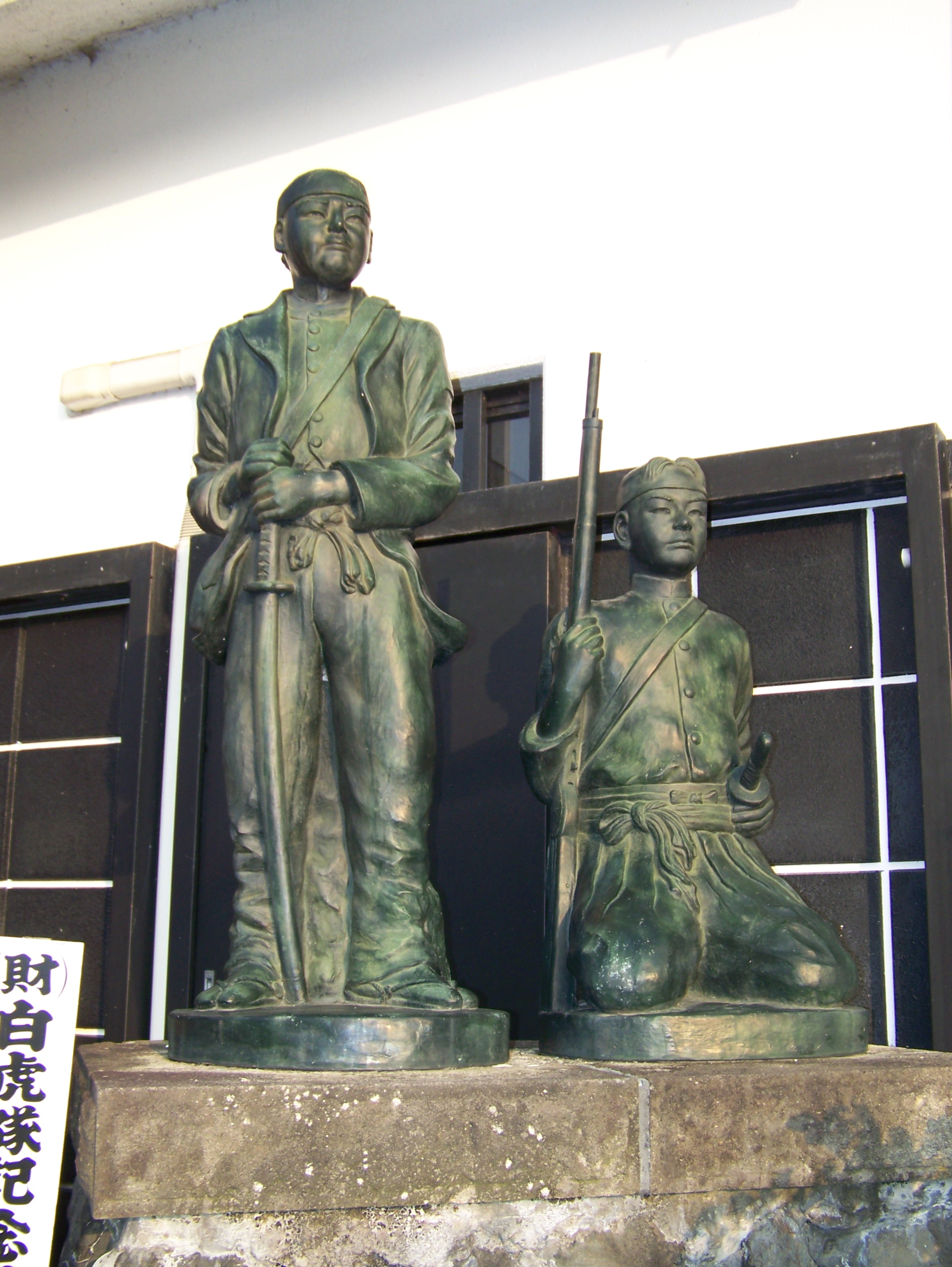
- Statue of Byakkotai warriors at Iimori Hill, Aizu-Wakamatsu, Fukushima Prefecture, Japan.
- Active: 1868
- Disbanded: 1868
- Country: Japan (Tokugawa shogunate)
- Allegiance: Aizu Domain
- Type: reserve force
- Role: Reserve force of Aizu Domain
- Size: 305
- Engagements: Boshin War: Battle of Aizu

The Byakkotai (白虎隊; "White Tiger Unit") was a group of around 305 young teenage samurai of the Aizu Domain, who fought in the Boshin War (1868–1869) on the side of the Tokugawa shogunate.

== History ==
The Byakkotai was part of Aizu's four-unit military, formed in April 1868 in the domain's drive to finalize its military modernization, in the wake of the Battle of Toba–Fushimi. The other three units were the Genbutai (Black Tortoise Unit), the Seiryūtai (Azure Dragon Unit), and the Suzakutai (Vermilion Bird Unit). Each of the four was named after the protecting gods of compass directions. Byakkotai was meant to be a reserve unit, as it was composed of the young, 16- to 17-year-old sons of Aizu samurai. It was subdivided further, along the lines of rank within the domain's samurai population: two squads were from the upper (shichū) rank, two from the middle rank (yoriai), and two from the lowest (ashigaru). Twenty of the members of the 2nd shichū squad, cut off from the rest of their unit in the wake of the Battle of Tonoguchihara, retreated to Iimori Hill, which overlooked the castle town. From there, they saw what they thought was the castle on fire, and committed seppuku (with one failed attempt) in desperation, believing their lord and families dead. However these 20 Byakkotai members were mistaken in their assessment of defeat, as the castle defenses had not actually been breached; the castle town surrounding the inner citadel was aflame. As the majority of the town was between Iimori Mountain and the castle, the boys saw the rising smoke and assumed that the castle itself had fallen.

The 19 Byakkotai members who committed suicide were the following:

- Adachi Tōzaburō
- Ishiyama Toranosuke
- Shinoda Gisaburō (acting commander)
- Nagase Yūji
- Mase Genshichirō
- Aruga Orinosuke
- Itō Teijirō
- Suzuki Genkichi
- Nishikawa Shōtarō
- Yanase Katsusaburō
- Ikegami Shintarō
- Itō Toshihiko
- Tsuda Sutezō
- Nomura Komashirō
- Yanase Takeji
- Ishida Wasuke
- Ibuka Shigetarō
- Tsugawa Kiyomi
- Hayashi Yasoji

The sole survivor, Iinuma Sadakichi, attempted suicide but was unsuccessful. He was saved by a local peasant. After the war, he moved to the nearby city of Sendai, and lived there until his death. He also served as an officer in the army (retiring with the rank of captain) and as an official of the local post office in Sendai.

After the war, their bodies remained exposed to the elements until permission was finally granted by the imperial government to bury them. A memorial was later erected at Iimori Hill, and all 20 of the Byakkotai members named above are buried there. A stone bearing a poem by Matsudaira Katamori also stands at the site:

幾人の 涙は石にそそぐとも その名は世々に 朽じとぞ思ふ

Ikutari no namida wa ishi ni sosogu tomo sono na wa yoyo ni kuchiji to zo omou

"No matter how many people wash the stones with their tears, these names will never vanish from the world."

The rest of the Byakkotai continued to fight over the course of the Battle of Aizu, with many of the members contributing to the defense of the castle. Many Byakkotai members survived the war. Two of them who went on to prominent roles during the Meiji Era were the physicist and historian Dr Yamakawa Kenjirō and the Imperial Japanese Navy admiral Dewa Shigetō.

== European fascism and the Byakkotai ==
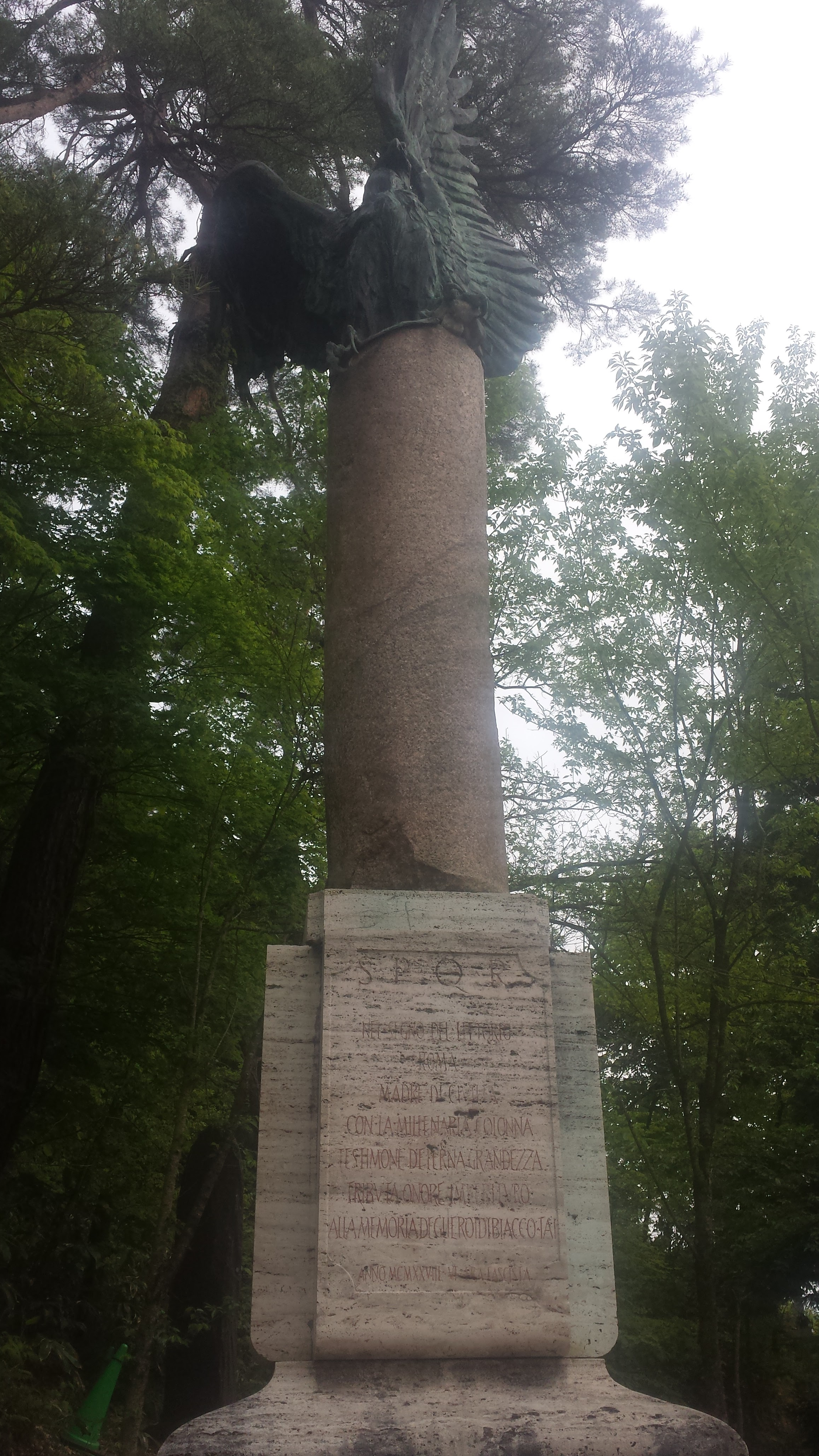
Pompeii column from Benito Mussolini currently erected on Iimoriyama

The Italian fascist dictator Benito Mussolini heard of the story of the Byakkotai members who committed suicide, and was deeply impressed by their loyalty to their lord. In 1928, he donated a column from Pompeii to be erected by the graves at Iimori Mountain; this column remains there to the present day. Nazi Germany also erected a monument showing their approval of the Byakkotai. After the surrender of Japan at the end of World War II, the U.S. Army removed the Nazi symbol from the German monument and replaced it with an iron cross.

== In popular culture ==
The Byakkotai have featured in several plays, books, films and television series, including the 1986 television show Byakkotai and a 2007 television show which starred Yamashita Tomohisa, Tanaka Koki and Taisuke Fujigaya. Yamashita portrayed a Byakkotai survivor, Sakai Mineji. The Byakkotai are featured in the real-time strategy game Total War: Shogun 2: Fall of the Samurai (2012) as a line infantry unit.

== Gallery ==
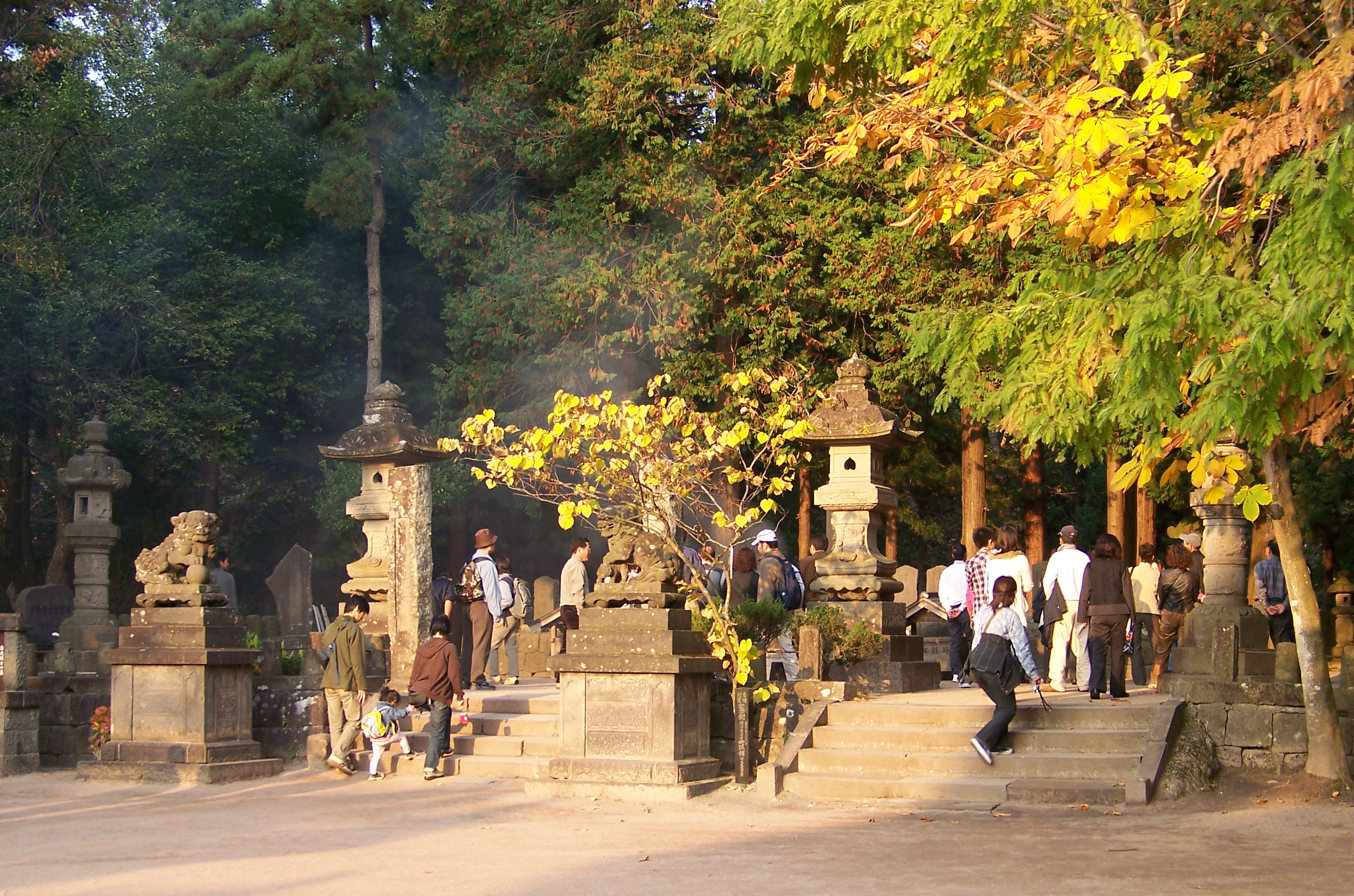
Memorial on Iimori Mountain.

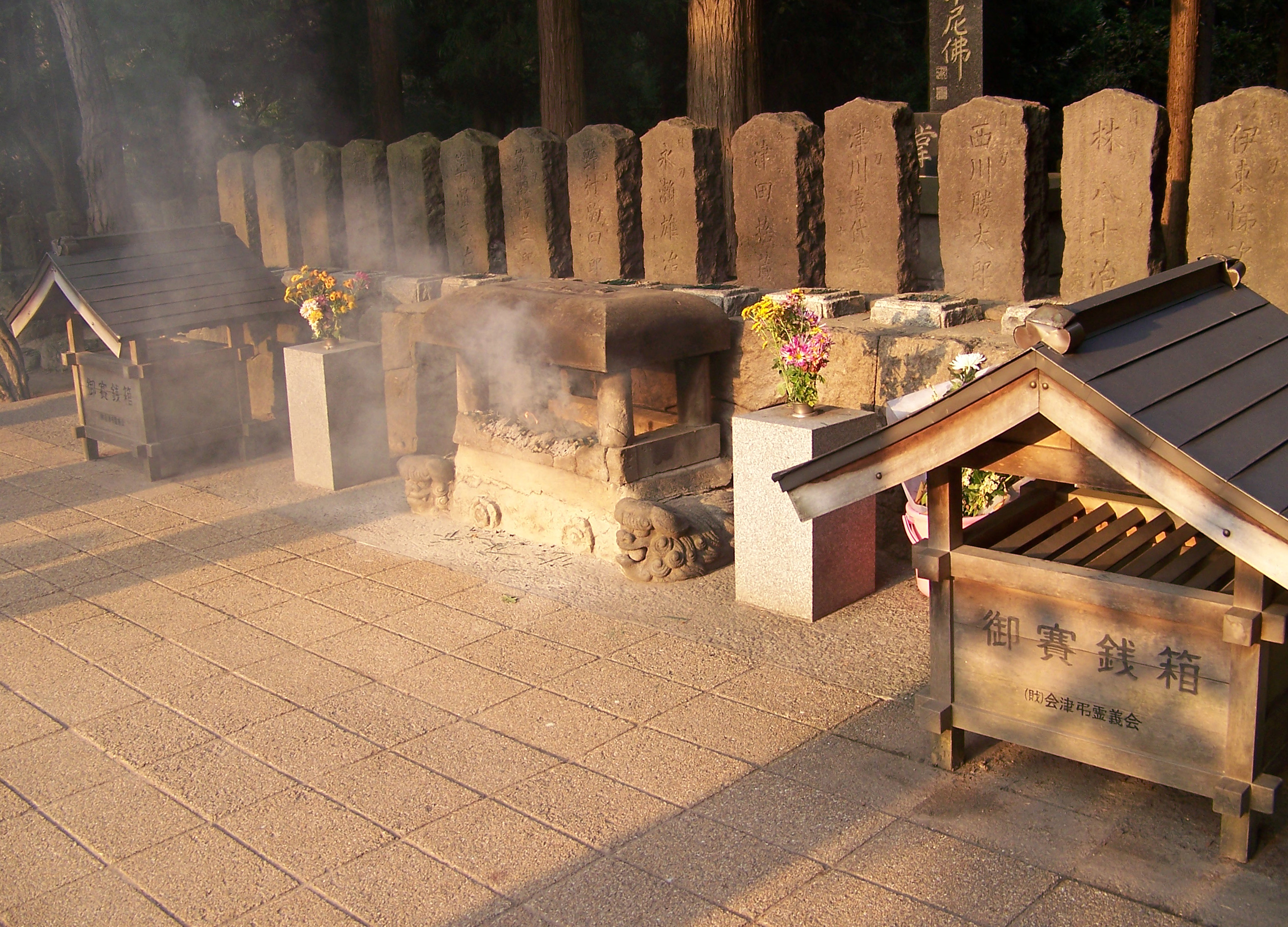
Tablets with the names of Byakkotai members who committed suicide.

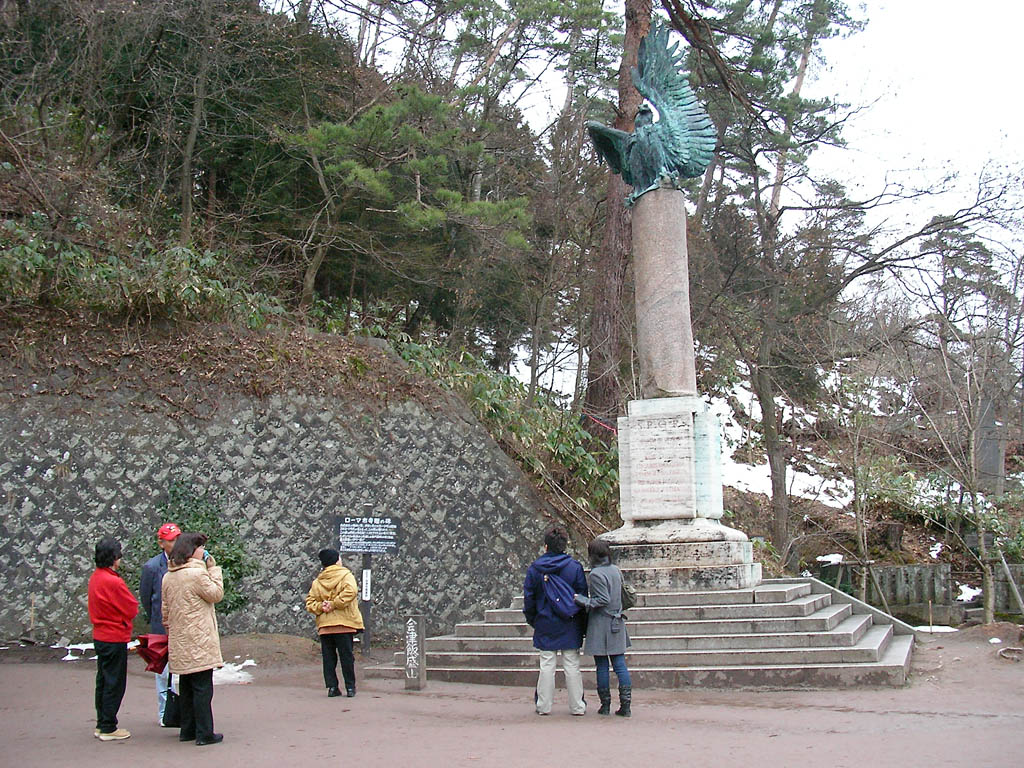
Column given by Mussolini.

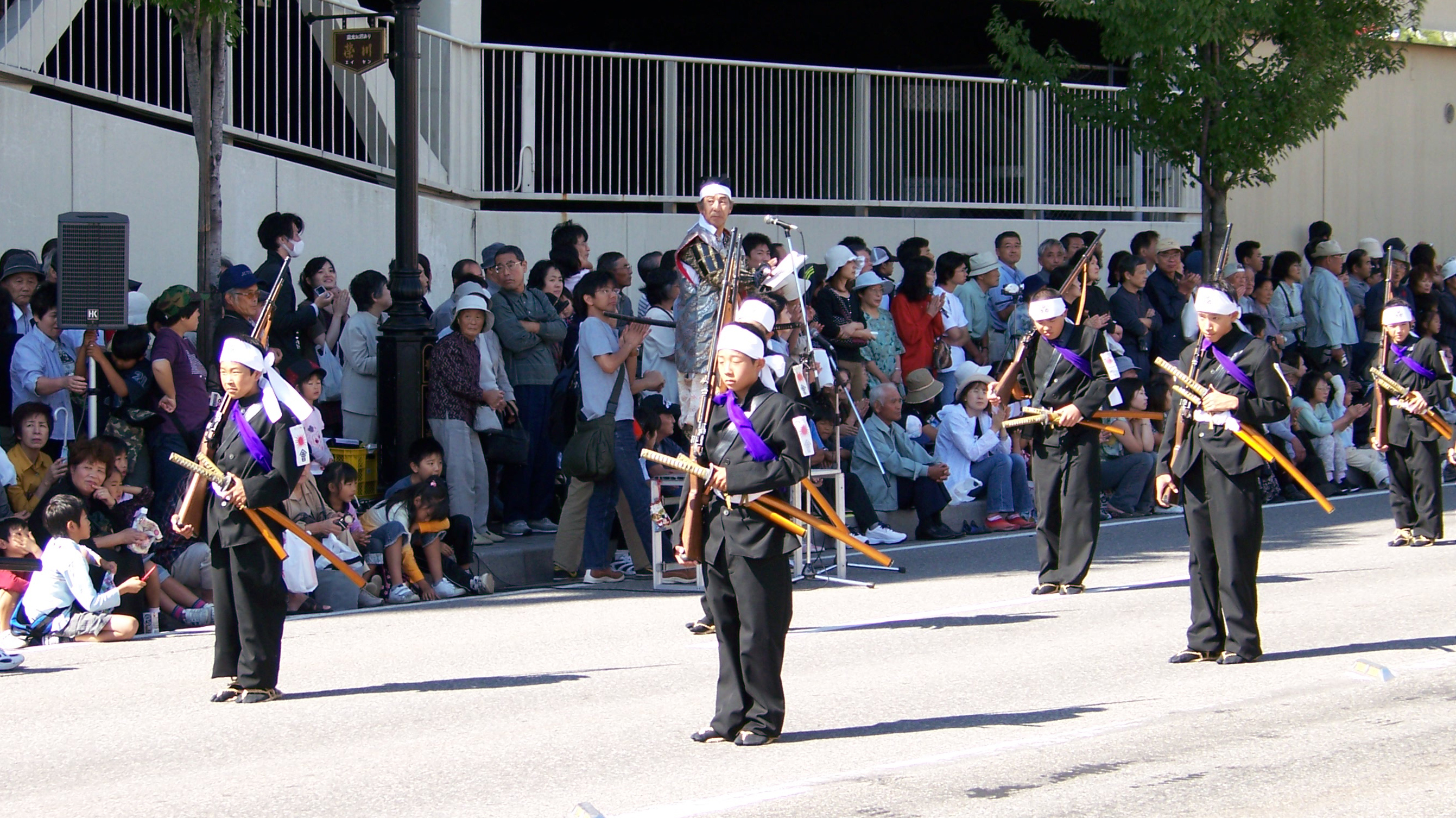
Children portraying Byakkotai soldiers at the annual Aizu clan parade (2006).

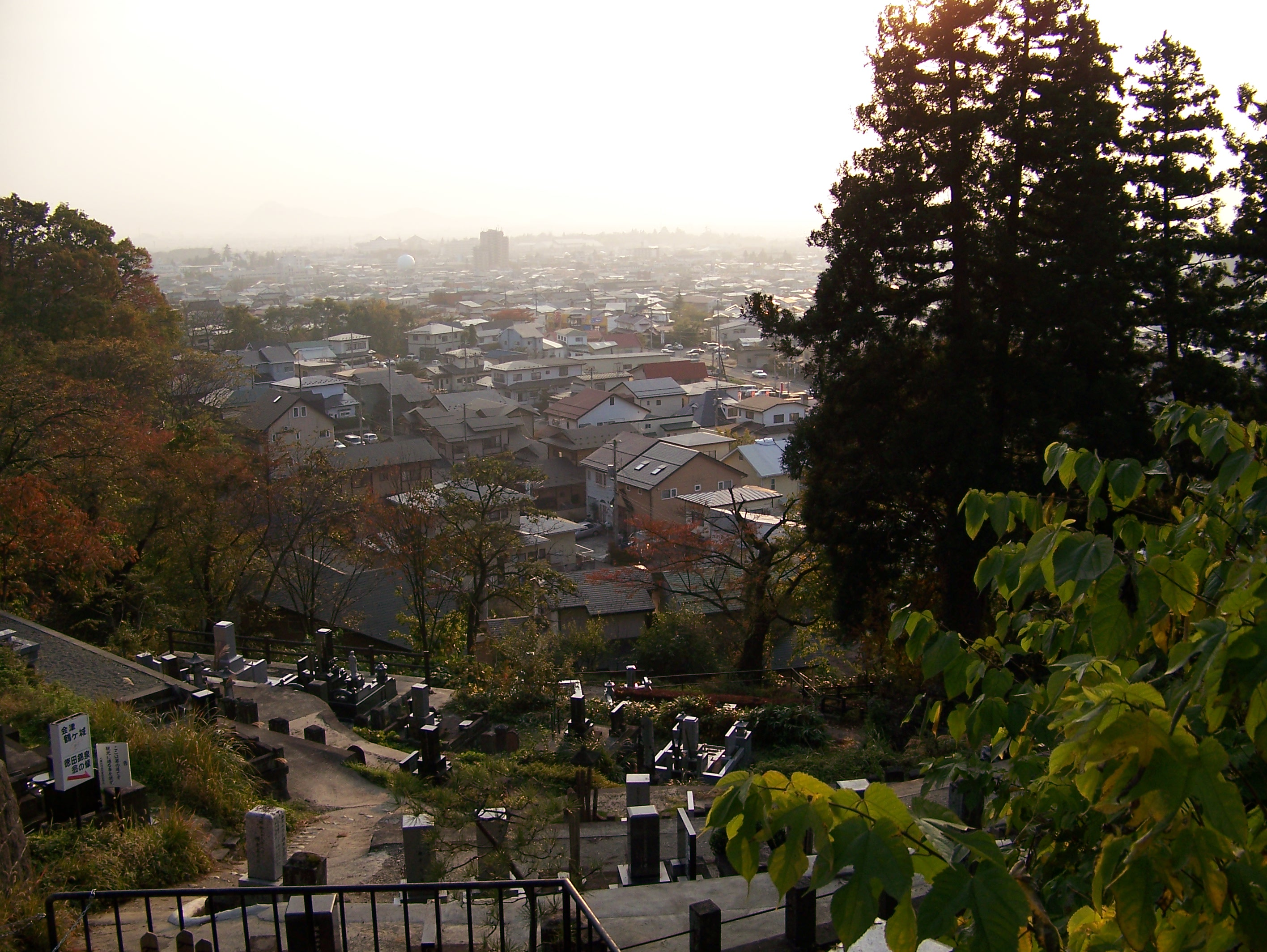
View from Iimori Mountain(2006).

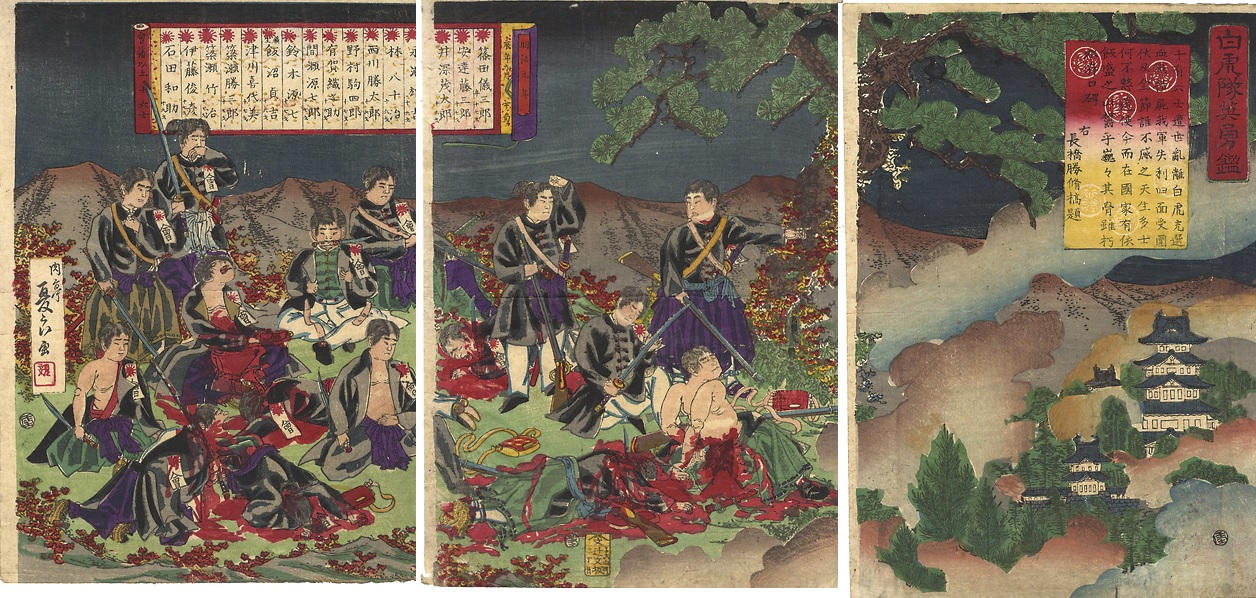
Byakkotai who committed Seppuku at Iimori Mountain, woodblock print

== See also ==
- Aizuwakamatsu Castle
- Fukushima Museum
- Nihonmatsu Shonentai
