= Ashina clan (Japan) =

Japanese clan

Ashina 蘆名
- The Ashina clan mon
- Parent house: Miura clan
- Founder: Miura Yoshiaki
- Cadet branches: Sagami-Ashina; Aizu-Ashina

The Ashina clan (Japanese: 蘆名氏, Hepburn: Ashina-shi) was a Japanese clan that emerged during the Sengoku period.

== History ==
The clan claims descent from the Taira clan through the Miura clan. Sometimes the kanji Kan-on characters "芦名" and "葦名" are used also. The name came from the area called Ashina in the city of Yokosuka in Kanagawa Prefecture.

There were two branches of the clan: Sagami-Ashina (相模蘆名氏) and Aizu-Ashina (会津蘆名氏). Sagami-Ashina originated when Miura Yoshitsugu's third son adopted the name Ashina. Aizu-Ashina was descended from Miura Yoshiaki's son Sawara Yoshitsuru. During the Muromachi period the clan claimed the shugo of Aizu. Together with the Soma clan, they suffered an effective defeat following the Kōriyama Campaign in 1588. In 1589 the clan suffered a severe loss against Date Masamune at the Battle of Suriagehara, leading to the demise of the clan.

== In popular media ==
The Ashina play a prominent role in Futaroh Yamada's novel Yagyu Ninpocho where, following their defeat by Masamune, they went into hiding only to emerge years later as shinobi in service to the daimyō of Aizu. They also appear in the 2019 video game Sekiro: Shadows Die Twice, which takes place in a fantasy version of the Sengoku Jidai. One other appearance of the clan is in Total War: Shogun 2. They are a non playable clan that the player may interact with.

== List of Head Family ==
- (Founder) Miura Yoshiaki (1092–1180)
1. Sawara Yoshitsura, son of Yoshiaki
2. Sawara Moritsura, son of Yoshitsura
3. Ashina Mitsumori, son of Yoshitsura
4. Ashina Yasumori, nephew of Mitsumori
5. Ashina Morimune, son of Yasumori
6. Ashina Morikazu (1285–1335), son of Morimune
7. Ashina Naomori (1323–1391), brother of Morikazu
8. Ashina Norimori (1346–1407), son of Naomori
9. Ashina Morimune (1386–1434), son of Norimori
10. Ashina Morihisa (1416–1444), son of Morimune
11. Ashina Morinobu (1408–1451), brother of Morihisa
12. Ashina Moriakira (1431–1466), son of Morinobu
13. Ashina Moritaka (1448–1558), son of Moriakira
14. Ashina Morishige (1482–1521), son of Moritaka
15. Ashina Morikiyo (1490–1553), brother of Morishige
16. Ashina Moriuji (1521–1561), son of Morikiyo
17. Ashina Morioki (1547–1574), son of Moriuji
18. Ashina Moritaka (1561–1584), adopted son of Morioki
19. Ashina Kameomaru (1584–1586), son of Moritaka
20. Ashina Yoshihiro (1575–1631), descendant of Sawara Yoshitsura’s brother.
21. Ashina Moritoshi (1631–1651), son of Yoshihiro
22. Ashina Sentsurumaru (1650–1653), son of Moritoshi

== Works cited ==
- 泉田邦彦; 今泉徹; 坂本正仁; 柴裕之; 関周一; 高橋修; 中根正人; 森木悠介 (26 March 2021). 佐々木倫郎; 千葉篤志 (eds.). 戦国佐竹氏研究の最前線 (in Japanese). Tōkyō: Yamakawa Shuppansha. ISBN 978-4-634-15181-9. NCID BC06499277, NAID 110007707970, JPNO 23512961, NDLBibID:031345101.
