= Ashina Moriuji =

Japanese Azuchi–Momoyama period daimyō

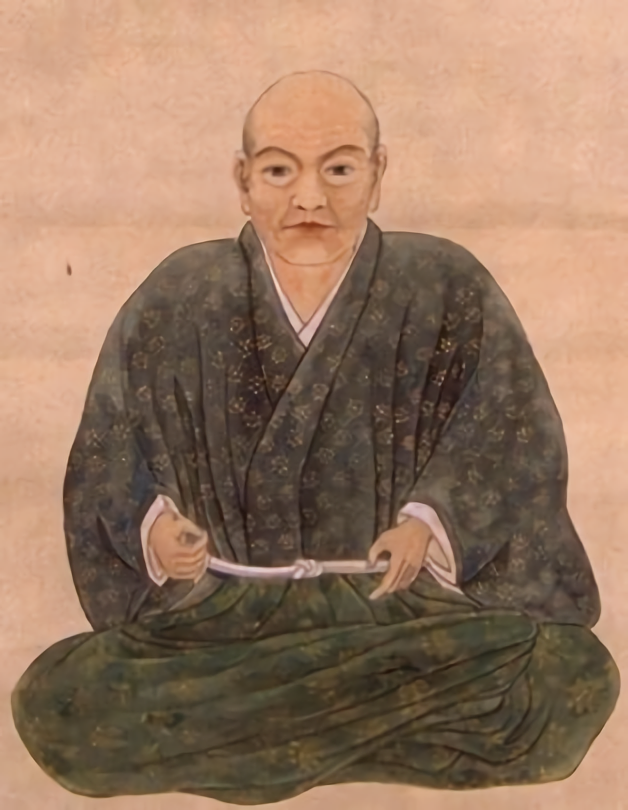
Ashina Moriuji

Ashina Moriuji (蘆名 盛氏; 1521 – July 28, 1580) was a Japanese daimyō of the Azuchi–Momoyama period. He ruled Kurokawa Castle and its environs in Mutsu Province in northern Japan until 1561, when he turned his domain over to his son and retired to engage in cultural pursuits.

He was responsible for building Mukaihaguroyama Castle, completed in 1561, which he used as a residence when in retirement. The artist Sesson Shukei is reported to have travelled to Aizu at least twice to give him lessons in painting – first in 1546, and then again in 1561 after Moriuji's retirement.
