= Aizuwakamatsu Castle =

Castle in Japan

Wakamatsu Castle
- 若松城
- Aizuwakamatsu, Fukushima Prefecture, Japan
- The reconstructed tenshu (keep) at Tsuruga Castle

Site information
- Type: Hirayamashiro (hilltop castle)
- Condition: The tenshu was reconstructed using concrete in 1965.

Location
- Location within Fukushima Prefecture Location within Japan
- Coordinates: 37°29′16″N 139°55′47″E

Site history
- Built: 1384
- Built by: Ashina Naomori
- In use: 1384 to 1889

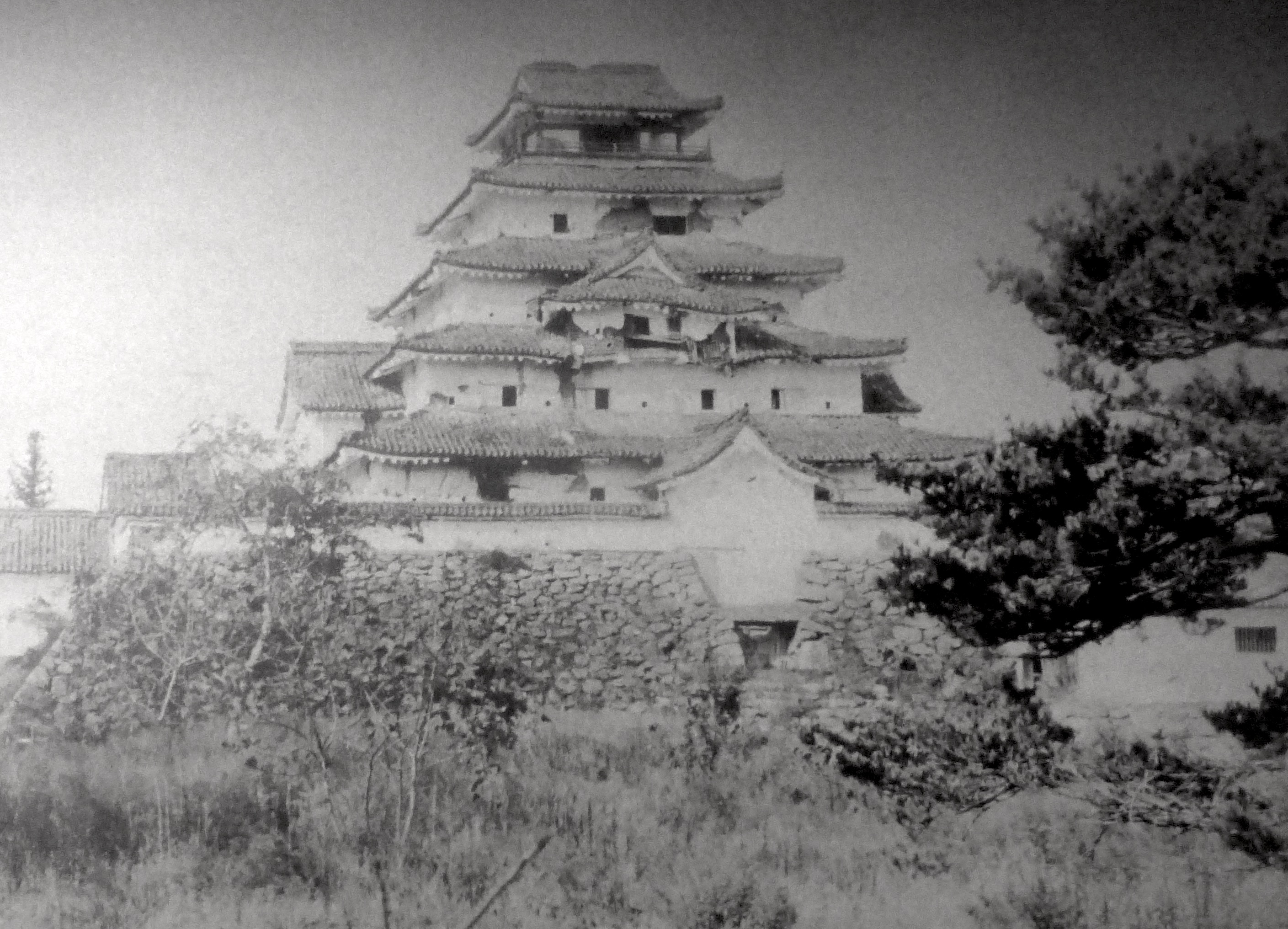
The original tenshu of Aizuwakamatsu Castle (1868)

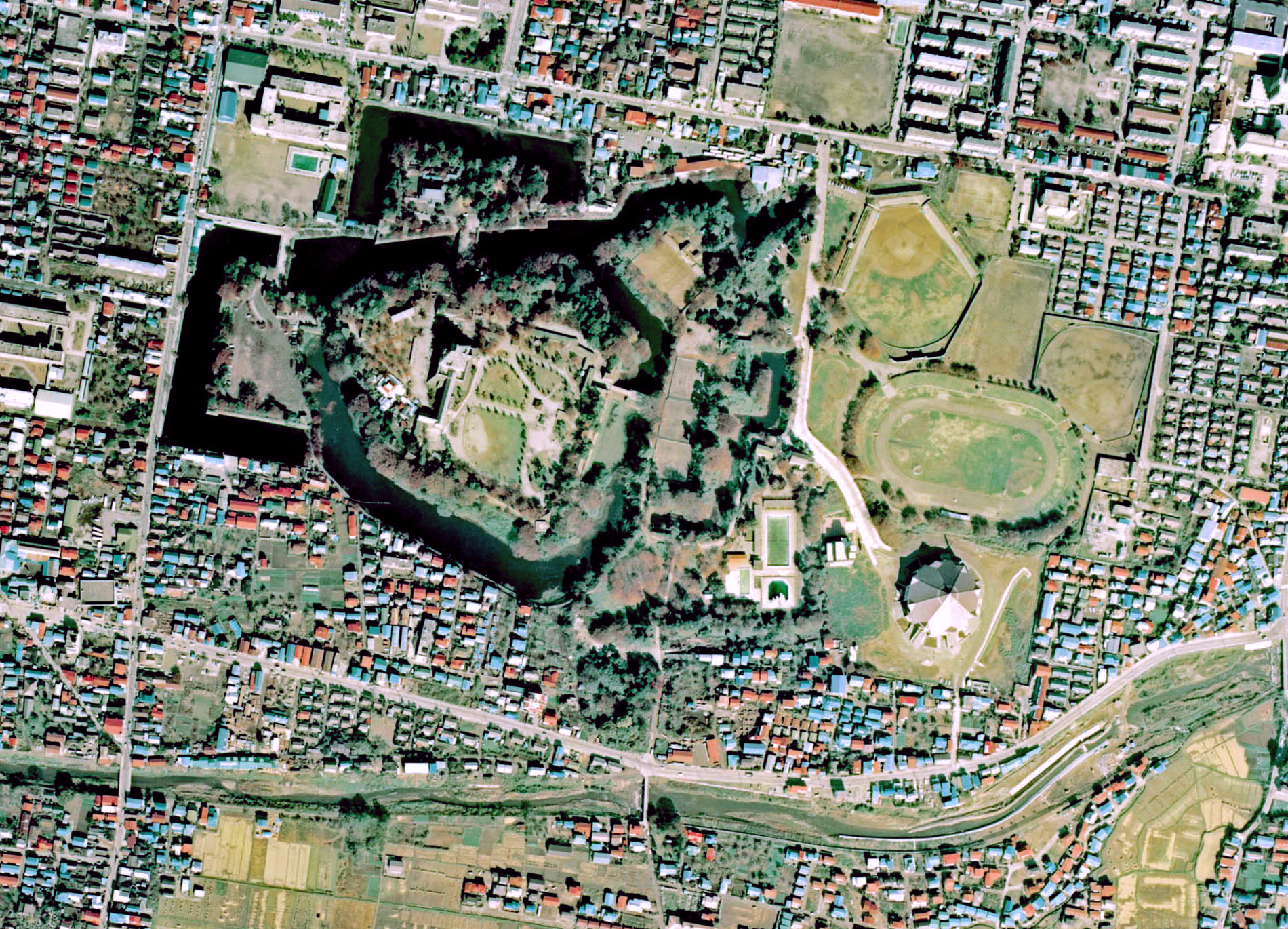
Aizuwakamatsu Castle on the left

Wakamatsu Castle (若松城, Wakamatsu-jō), also known as Tsuruga Castle (鶴ヶ城, Tsuru-ga-jō) and Aizuwakamatsu Castle (会津若松城, Aizuwakamatsu-jō), is a Japanese castle in northern Japan, at the center of the city of Aizuwakamatsu, in Fukushima Prefecture.

== Background ==
Tsuruga Castle is located in the center of the Aizu basin and at crossroads to Kōriyama to the north and Yonezawa to the east and Murakami on the Sea of Japan coast. During the Nanboku-cho period, the area was ruled by the Ashina clan. Ashina Naomori built Kurokawa Castle (黒川城, Kurokawa-jō) within the Aizu basin in 1384. This castle was the predecessor of what later became Tsuruga Castle. It was ruled by Ashina Moriuji until 1561, when he turned his domain over to his son.

The Ashina clan also built Mukaihaguroyama Castle, a huge mountain castle 10 kilometers south of Aizuwakamatsu. However, by the Sengoku period, the power of the Ashina clan had weakened. Date Masamune, the greatest warlord of the Tōhoku area, had struggled against the Ashina clan for years, and finally captured the castle in 1589 at the Siege of Kurokawa Castle. However, Masamune was in turn forced to pledge fealty to Toyotomi Hideyoshi in 1590, and was obliged to relocate north to Sendai. Aizu then came to be ruled by one of Hideyoshi's generals, Gamō Ujisato. Ujisato was expected to keep a close watch on Date Masamune, and thus rebuilt Kurokawa Castle into a modern castle in 1592, renaming it Tsuruga Castle, although the populace also referred to it as Aizu Castle or Wakamatsu Castle. He also built an unprecedentedly huge seven-story tenshu in 1593.

== History ==
Ujisato died of illness at the age of 39, and Toyotomi Hideyoshi reassigned his vast domain to Uesugi Kagekatsu, whom he relocated from Echigo Province. Although Tsuruga Castle was already large, Uesugi Kagekatsu started to build another castle on the outskirts of Aizuwakamatsu town, but it was never completed. After having sided with the Toyotomi clan during the Sekigahara campaign, the Uesugi Clan was demoted in status and relocated to a much reduced Yonezawa Domain. The domain was then assigned to Katō Yoshiaki, who was noted for his bravery at the Battle of Shizugatake. Under the Katō, the castle was reformed and a new layout was imposed on the surrounding jōkamachi. However, during a great earthquake in 1611, the castle was severely damaged, and the tenshu was rebuilt into the current configuration. The Katō were dispossessed in 1643 and were replaced by Hoshina Masayuki, the illegitimate son of Shōgun Tokugawa Hidetada and thus half-brother of Tokugawa Iemitsu. He later served a regent to the underage Shōgun Tokugawa Ietsuna. Within Aizu, he developed commerce and agriculture, and established a han school, the Nisshinkan. His successors were permitted to take the "Matsudaira" surname. Throughout the Edo period, Aizu Domain was an important Tokugawa stronghold in the Tōhoku region and was one of the strongest domains in terms of its military power.

During the Bakumatsu period, Matsudaira Katamori was one of the Shōgunate's most able and loyalist supporters. After the defeat of the Shōgunate at the Battle of Toba–Fushimi and the abdication of power by Shōgun Tokugawa Yoshinobu, Matsudaira become one of the leaders in the pro-Tokugawa alliance against the new Meiji government. During the Battle of Aizu in the Boshin War, Tsuruga Castle was besieged by the forces of the Satchō Alliance in October 1868. Although the castle was very strong by traditional standards, the new government army was equipped with western artillery, which was able to shell the castle from surrounding hills for over a month. Faced with the inevitable eventual defeat, Matsudaira surrendered the castle and his remaining forces in November. The surviving castle buildings, pockmarked by artillery during the siege and structurally unstable, were demolished by the new government in 1874. One yagura survived the destruction by being relocated to a Buddhist temple, Amida-ji, five-kilometers from the castle.

The castle site was mostly sold off to private landowners, with only the central portion (23 hectares) kept by the government for use by an Imperial Japanese Army garrison until 1908. This area forms the core of the modern National Historic Site. With the popularity of the Byakkotai story in pre-war Japan, a movement arose to preserve the site of the castle, and it was made into a public park. The National Historic Site status was granted in 1934, although the area still suffered from indignities, such as a velodrome operating in the inner bailey until 1957. In 1965, a reconstruction of the tenshu in concrete was completed as a symbol of the city. Currently there is a museum inside, and an observation gallery on top with panoramic views of the city. A gate was completed at the same time. In 1991, a yagura and a connecting corridor were also reconstructed.

The tea room, named Rinkaku, has been restored and is designated as a Fukushima Prefecture Important Cultural Property. It is open to the public, and at times tea ceremonies are held there.

The castle on a sunny day, 2017

== Layout ==
The primary layout of the castle consists of an inner bailey and three secondary enclosures to the west, north and east. The southern face of the castle was protected by a river. The inner bailey is pentagonal, with length of approximately 200 meters, surrounded by deep moats and tall stone walls. The area is divided internally by walls and corridors, and the tenshu is in the northwest corner. The original tenshu under the Gamō clan was a massive seven-story structure with black walls and gold roof tiles, similar to Toyotomi Hideyoshi's Osaka Castle. The tenshu, rebuilt by the Katō clan, was smaller and painted white. The secondary enclosures of the castle had clay ramparts, with stonework used in the gate areas. In the north and west of the central area were large bastions.

The total size of the castle area was 600 by 400 meters, but the castle town itself was also guarded by an outer barrier and the river, enclosing a square kilometer.

== See also ==
- List of Historic Sites of Japan (Fukushima)
- Battle of Bonari Pass
- Byakkotai
- Komine Castle
- Shinsengumi
- Ōuetsu Reppan Dōmei
- Fukushima Museum
