= Mogami Yoshiaki Historical Museum =

Coordinates: 38°15′18.3″N 140°20′0.3″E

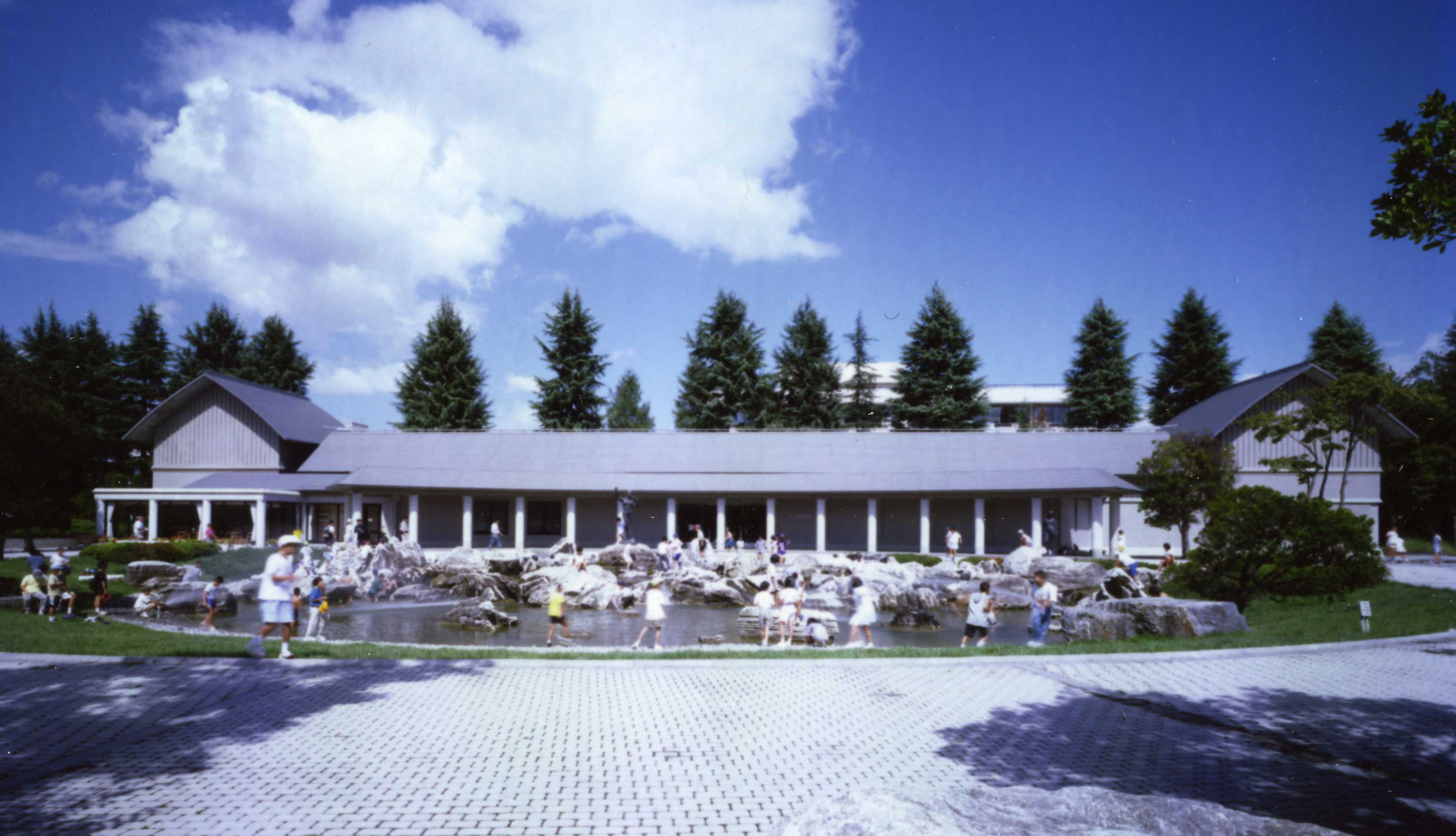
- Established: 1989
- Location: Yamagata, Yamagata, Japan
- Public transit access: Yamagata Station
- Website: http://mogamiyoshiaki.jp/index.php

The Mogami Yoshiaki Historical Museum (最上義光歴史館, Mogami Yoshiaki Rekishikan) is a museum in the city of Yamagata in northern Japan just outside the reconstructed Great Eastern Gate of Yamagata Castle. It focuses on the place in history of Mogami Yoshiaki and his role in building the foundations of present-day Yamagata. The museum opened on 1 December 1989 in commemoration of the 100th anniversary of the founding of modern Yamagata City. Its purpose is to preserve and study, display and make accessible to the public historical items from Yoshiaki's time (1546- 1614) when the Yamagata Domain was the fifth largest feudal domain in Japan. Armory, swords and firearms from the historic battles of the 16th century and later are exhibited, along with art works, old maps of the castle town and official documents connected with the Mogami clan and its history. Among the museum's most prized items exhibited are the large standing screen of the Battle of Hasedo, and Mogami Yoshiaki's helmet and battle command baton. There are also special exhibitions of old and modern swords. The museum has English information on the exhibits available. Admission is free. The museum is open from 9 a.m. to 5 p.m., and is closed Mondays.

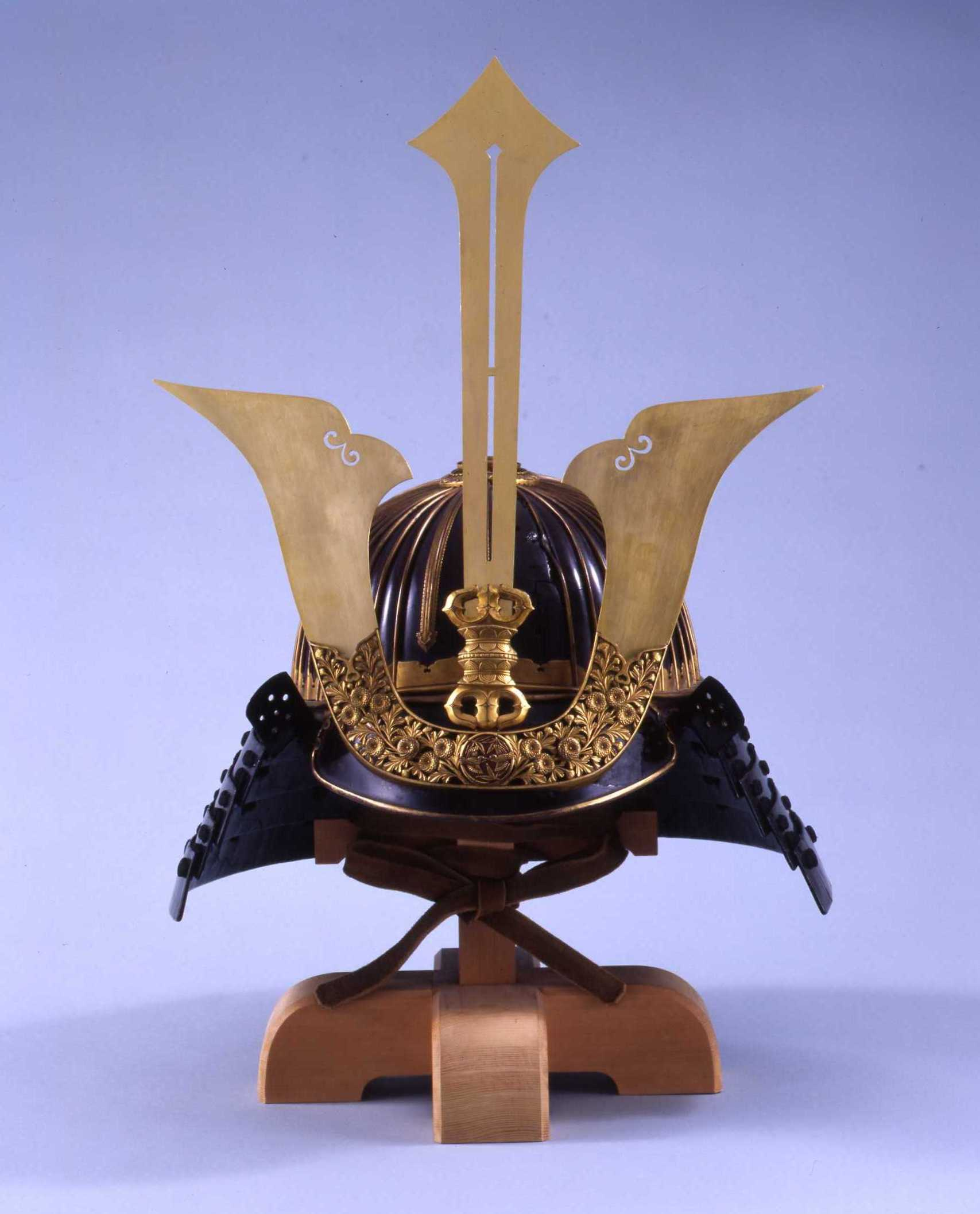
Mogami Yoshiaki's battle helmet, worn at the Battle of Hasedo

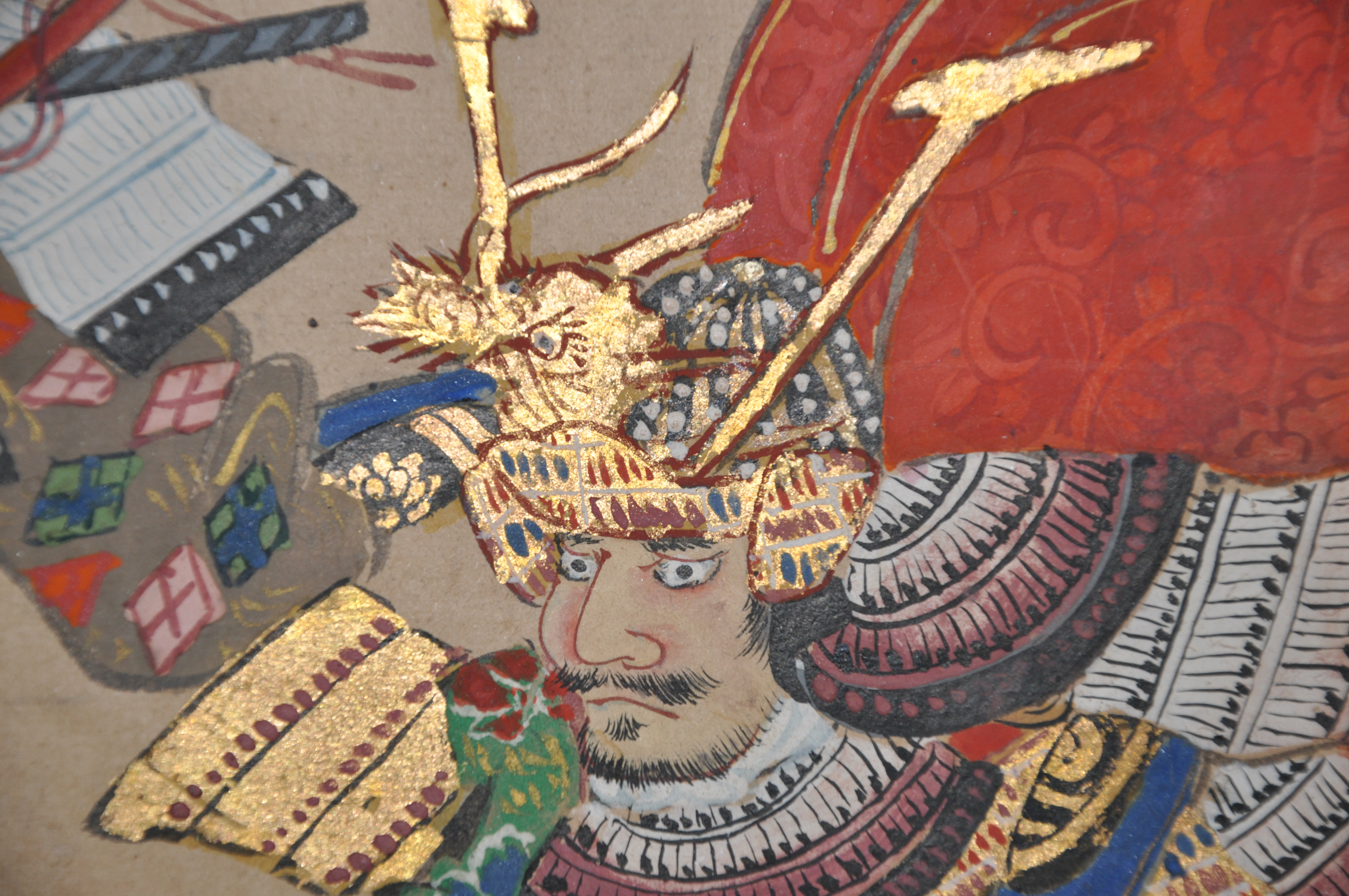
Painting of Mogami Yoshiaki from the Battle of Hasedo standing screen, mid Edo period

== Address ==
1-53 Ote-machi, Yamagata-shi, Yamagata-ken
