= Mogami Yoshiaki =

Daimyo of the Yamagata domain

- 最上 義光
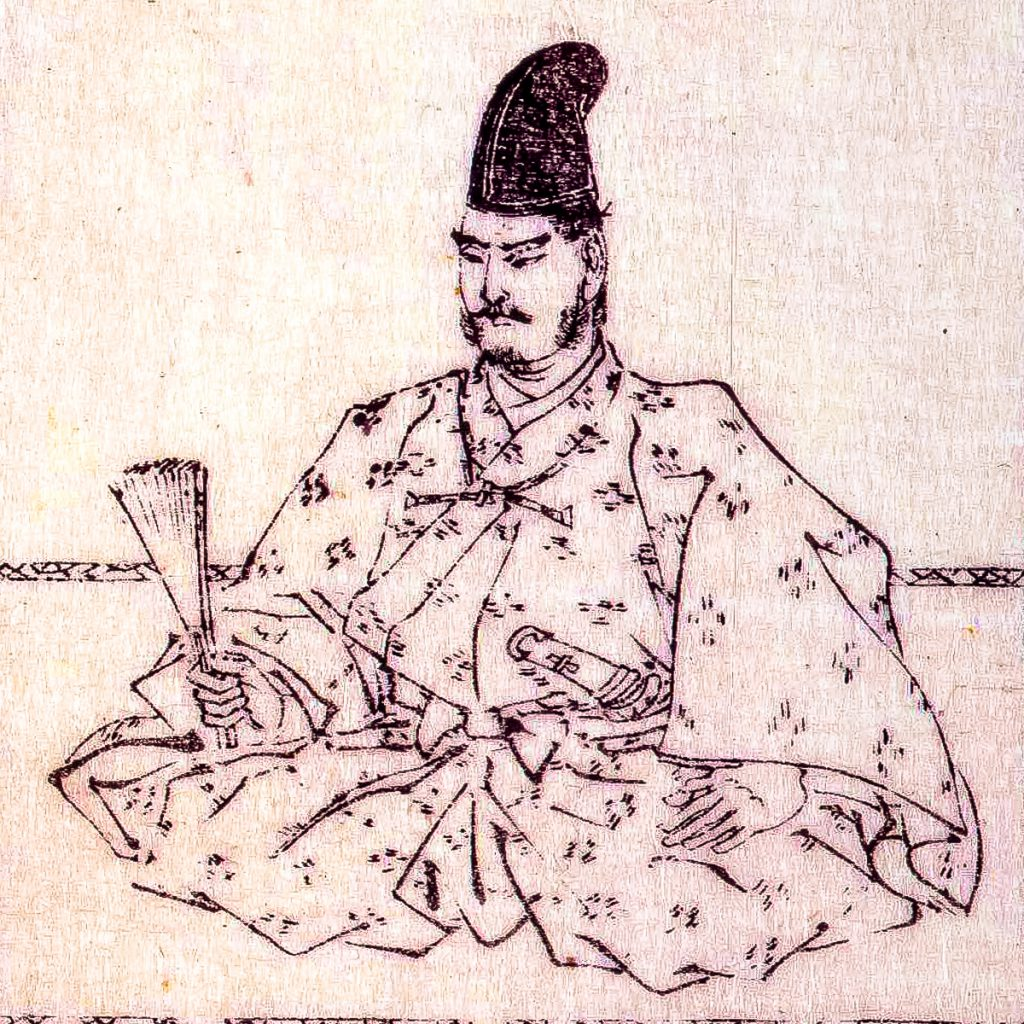

Head of Mogami clan
- In office 1571–1614
- Preceded by: Mogami Yoshimori
- Succeeded by: Mogami Yoshitoshi

Daimyō of Yamagata Domain
- In office 1600–1614
- Succeeded by: Torii Tadamasa

Personal details
- Born: Hakujumaru; February 1, 1546 Yamagata Domain
- Died: February 26, 1614 (aged 68) Yamagata Castle
- Relations: Mogami Yoshimori (father); Yoshihime (sister); Date Terumune (brother in law); Date Masamune (nephew)
- Nickname: "Fox of Dewa"

Military service
- Allegiance: Mogami clan Toyotomi clan Eastern Army; Tokugawa shogunate
- Rank: Daimyo
- Unit: Mogami clan
- Commands: Yamagata domain
- Battles/wars: Dewa Province conquest (1580-1586); Battle of Jugorihara (1588); Siege of Odawara (1590); Kunohe Rebellion (1591); Siege of Shiroishi (1600); Siege of Hasedō (1600)

dMogami Yoshiaki (最上 義光; February 1, 1546 – February 26, 1614) was a daimyō of the Yamagata Domain in Dewa Province, in the late Sengoku and early Edo periods. He was known as the "Fox of Dewa".

His younger sister, Yoshihime, later became the wife of Date Terumune and gave birth to Masamune, making him the uncle of Date Masamune.

It was recorded in historical documents that his height was over 180 cm.

== Biography ==
=== Early life ===
Mogami Yoshiaki was born on the first day of the first month of the Tenbun era (1546) to his father, Yoshimori, and his mother, Nagaura. His birth name was Hakujumaru and he succeeded his father as daimyō of Yamagata Prefecture. The Mogami clan which he hailed from has a prestigious bloodline that descended from the Shiba clan, a branch of Ashikaga clan, and the "Yoshi" character of his name "Yoshiaki" was bestowed directly by the 13th shogun, Ashikaga Yoshiteru. Furthermore, the Mogami clan was in the position as direct vassals of the Ashikaga shogunate. As a boy who was raised in a samurai and aristocratic clan, Yoshiaki had the literary ability to compose letters over three meters long and was able to enjoy renga in Kyoto alongside famous renga poets such as Satomura Shōha.

On June 14, 1563 (Eiroku 6), Yoshiaki, aged 17, and his father went to Kyoto to have an audience with Shogun Yoshiteru and present him with a horse and a sword.

In 1564, when his sister Yoshihime married Date Terumune, the Mogami clan became allied with the Date clan. At some point during this period, the Mogami clan underwent a succession conflict. (Note: It was though by secondary sources as conflict between Yoshiaki with his younger brother, Yoshitoki. However, due to the absence of Mogami Yoshitoki existence in the primary source historical records, historian Yasutsune Owada suspected this was actually conflict between Yoshiaki with his father, Yoshimori. This led to Historian Hase Kanzaburō to further suspect that the dispute around the Mogami clan's head succession which revolved around Yoshiaki was nonexistent. However, in the Komyoji version of the Mogami clan's tree document(compiled in 1746), Nakano-dono appeared as the younger brother of Mogami Yoshimitsu. Based on this material, professor Kenji Matsuo did not dismiss the possibility the existence of Yoshiaki's younger brother who disputed the position inheritance of Yoshiaki.) (Note: historian Awano Toshiyuki proposed alternative theory that Mogami Yoshimori's retirement was around 1561, and the Mogami civil war was not a civil war among the Mogami family for the family headship, but a rebellion by vassals who opposed against Yoshiaki's policy of tightening the control over the clan after he succeeded to the clan's leadership, and supported Yoshimori, who had retired.)

In 1570, at the age of 25, Yoshiaki inherited the clan leadership from his father and set upon his goal of reviving the hereditary position of his clan as Oshu Tandai (Overseer of Dewa Province, the areas of which encompass modern-day Akita and Yamagata prefectures). He expanded not only into the northern and western parts of Yamagata Prefecture, but also into the southern part of Akita Prefecture.

Due to the confusion over the succession of the Mogami clan, local lords in the Dewa Province, such as Tendo Yorisada, and his clan members Higashine Yorichage, Kaminoyama Mitsukane, and Shiratori Nagahisa, tried to become independent. Yoshiaki, who inherited the family headship, used fairly forceful methods to suppress their attempts to declare independence from the Mogami clan. Mogami had Kaminoyama's vassal Satomi Minbu betray and kill him. Mogami also had Yorichage's vassal Satomi Kageyori betray and kill him. Having destroyed the unity of the Tendo family, Yoshiaki exiled Tendo Yorisada's son Yorimizu, who had succeeded him after his death.

=== Unification of Dewa province ===
In 1571, Mogami Yoshiaki officially became the head of the Mogami clan. During this time, Yoshihime sent information about the Date clan to Yoshiaki, her and Yoshiaki's actions made the Date clan distrust the Mogami family. Yoshiaki fought against the Date clan twice in different years, 1574 and 1578, in both battles Yoshihime advanced to the middle of the battlefield to create a peace treaty. Yoshiaki married a woman from the Osaki clan of the Mutsu province, who was his relative. When Date later attacked the Osaki clan the relationship between Yoshimitsu and Date Masamune deteriorated.

In 1580, he got help from Satomi Minbu, allowing him to successfully take over the Kaminoyama Castle which led to Kaminoyama Mitsukane committing suicide.

In 1581, he expanded his power to Murayama District and took over Oguni Castle. Yoshiaki also attacked Sakenobe Castle and forced Sakenobe Hidetsuna to surrender. Later, Hidetsuna became Yoshiaki's chief vassal. In 1583, he expanded the Semboku areas, and threatened Daihōji Yoshiuji. Daihōji declared war against the Mogami clan as result. Later, Yoshiuji was defeated and committed suicide.

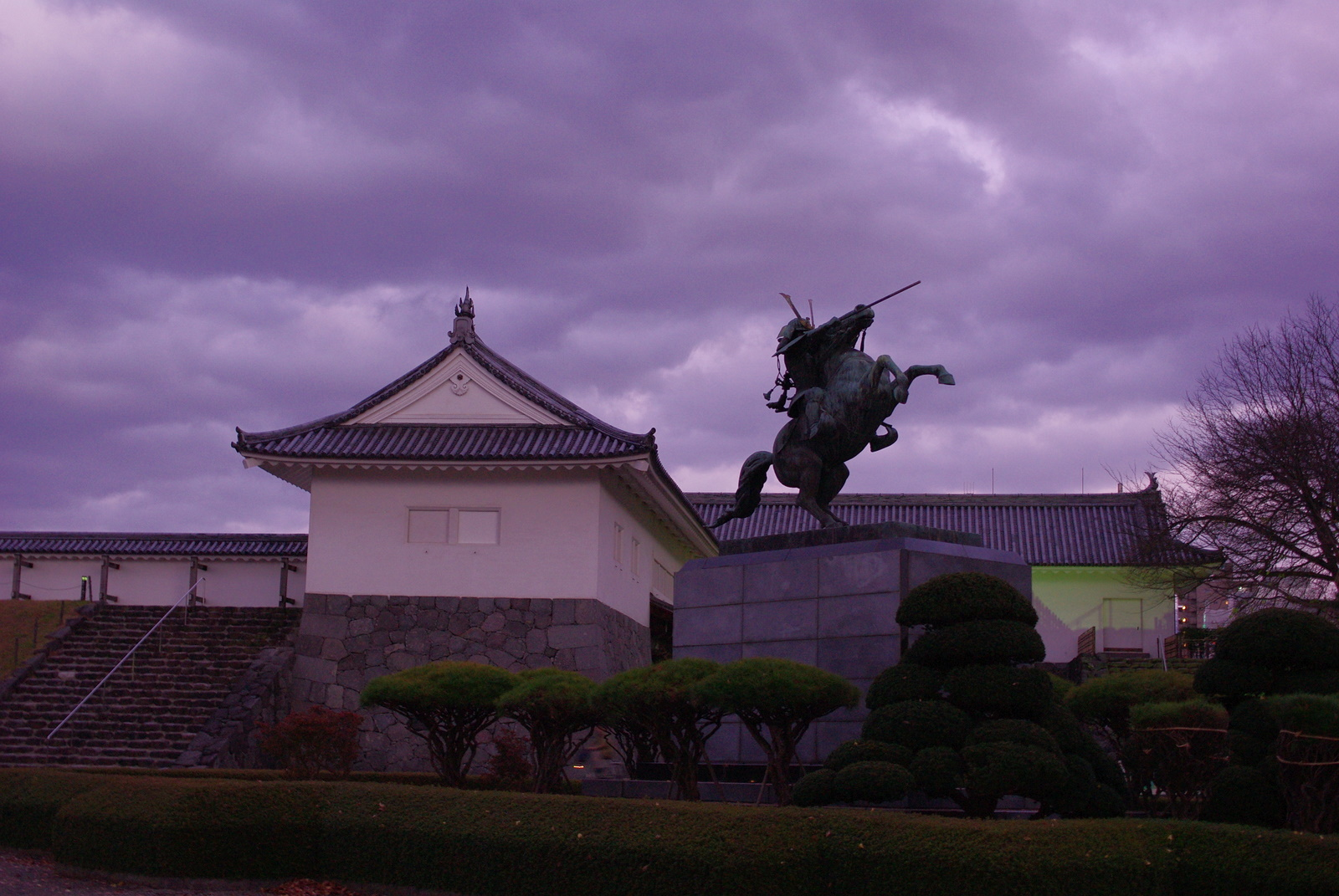
Statue of Mogami Yoshiaki

In 1584, Yoshiaki defeated the Sagae clan which was led by Sagae Takamoto who committed suicide. Yoshiaki then attacked the Tendo clan, who were based in Tendo, just north of Yamagata, into Kokubu (present-day Miyagi Prefecture), led by Tendō Yorizumi. Later, Yorizumi fled to the territory of Kokubun Morishige, causing the Tendō clan to collapse. Furthermore, he also defeated the Shiratori clan within the same area.

Meanwhile, in Dewa Province, one of the remaining local lords in conflict with Yoshiaki was Nagahisa Shiratori. Nagahisa Shiratori's territory was in Murayama County, Dewa Province, near present-day Murayama, Yamagata. He was an obstacle to Yoshiaki, who was trying to pacify Dewa, but he also had connections with Oda Nobunaga and was plotting to obtain the title of Dewa no Kami (Lord of Dewa). Yoshiaki, who had read of these developments, invited Shiratori Nagahisa to his castle, Yamagata Castle, in 1584, claiming to be seriously ill. According to the "Tale of Mogami Yoshiaki" written in the early Edo period, Yoshiaki, who was bedridden, asked Shiratori Nagahisa to "serve as guardian until my eldest son, Yoshiyasu, comes of age," and handed him a family tree that had been passed down from his ancestors. It is recorded that when Shiratori Nagahisa was about to receive the family tree document, Yoshiaki suddenly killed him with a sword that he had hidden. With the elimination of Nagahisa, the Mogami clan finally asserted their dominance of the region. It was reported that the assassination of Nagahisa was ordered by Oda Nobunaga several years prior, before the Honnō-ji Incident in 1582, when Nagahisa enraged Nobunaga by lying to Nobunaga claiming that he was the ruler of Dewa province.

In 1586, Yoshiaki fought against Onodera Yoshimichi. Yoshiaki's eldest son, Mogami Yoshiyasu and Tateoka Mitsushige succeeded in defeating the Onodera reinforcements. In October, Yoshiaki crossed the Rokuji Highway and invaded Shōnai in an effort to reinforce Tōzenji Yoshinaga, lord of Tozenji Castle, against the attack of his enemy, Daihōji Yoshioki. Yoshioki was defeated in battle the same month and committed suicide, causing the Daihōji clan to go extinct. In 1587, he succeeded in taking control of Shonai (western Yamagata prefecture). However, the next year, his army was defeated and routed by Honjō Shigenaga, a retainer of Uesugi Kagekatsu, in Battle of Jugorihara. This defeat, along with the fact that his nephew, Date Masamune, was also expanding his own ambitions at the same time, and he was targeting domains within the Mogami clan, prompted Yoshiaki to give up Shōnai and move his focus towards the Date clan.

=== Conflict with Date Masamune ===
In 1588, an internal conflict broke out within the Osaki clan, the former Oshu Tandai, protector of Oshu region, with the Mogami and Date clans, who had each requested reinforcements, entered into a state of war. This conflict was brought to a peace agreement through the desperate pleas of his younger sister, Yoshihime, but while they were distracted by the conflict with the Date clan, Honjo Shigenaga, a subordinate of the Uesugi clan from Echigo Province, took over Shonai. In response to this, Yoshiaki sought to recapture the region from the Uesugi clan. However, when Toyotomi Hideyoshi came to power In 1590, he forbade any private wars among daimyo or feudal lords in Japan. Yoshiaki then submitted to Hideyoshi's authority. In the same year, Yoshiaki was given about 200,000 koku by Toyotomi Hideyoshi.

In 1589, on May, Tokugawa Ieyasu sent a letter to Katakura Kagetsuna, imploring him that Date Masamune reconcile with Yoshiaki.

=== Incident of Yoshiaki daughter ===
In 1591, after the Siege of Odawara, he participated in the Kunohe Rebellion. During this time, Toyotomi Hidetsugu, who had been chosen as Toyotomi Hideyoshi's successor, fell in love with Yoshiaki's daughter, Komahime, and married her, and Yoshiaki became an important Toyotomi daimyo as because of his relation to the Toyotomi clan. In 1591, Yoshiaki was allowed to use the surname of Toyotomi, and usually called himself Hashiba Yoshiaki. Although he did not end up sailing to Korea during the Bunroku Invasion, in 1592, he went to Nagoya Castle in Hizen with 500 of his retainers to prepare for passage to Korea.

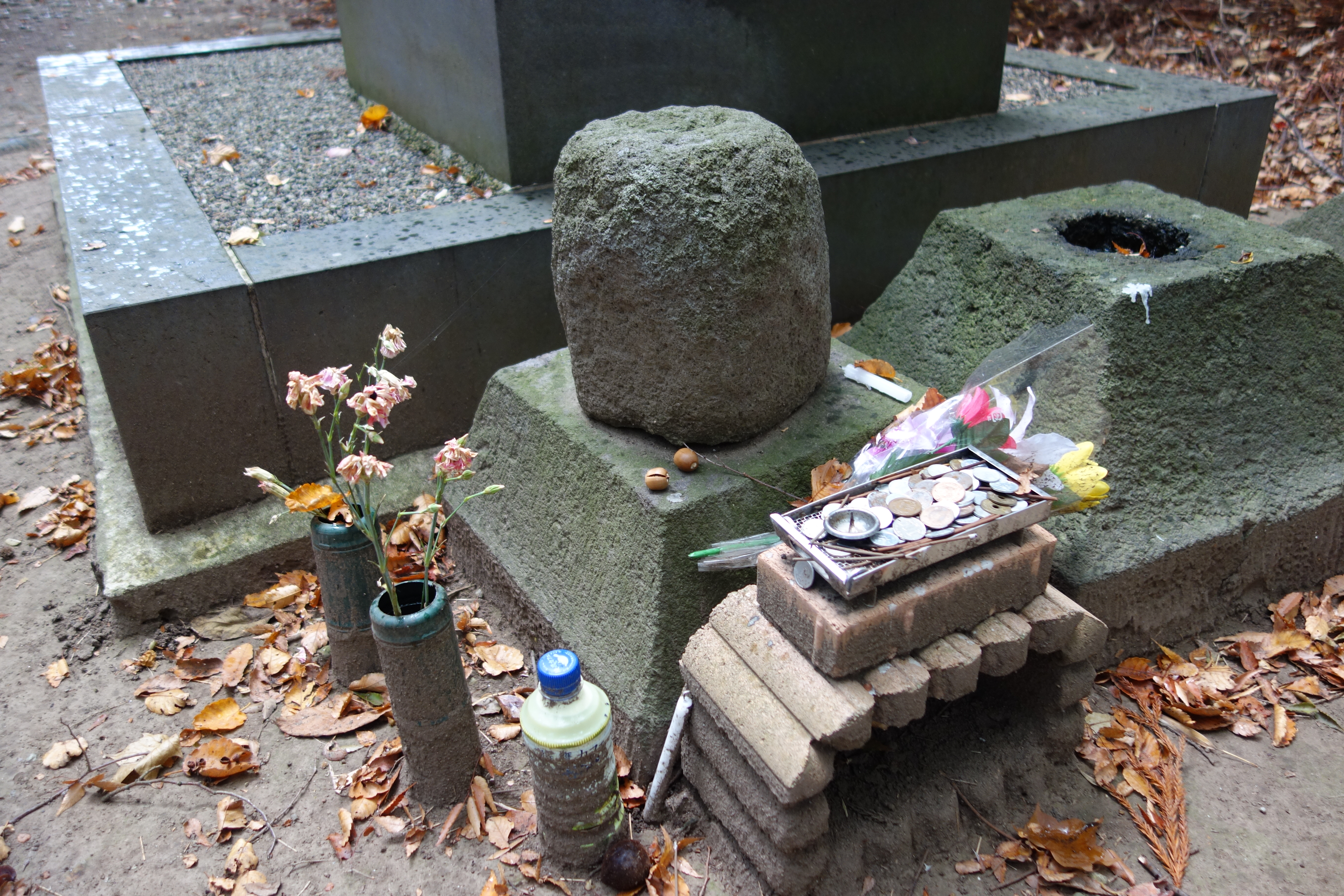
Tomb of princess Koma, daughter of Mogami Yoshiaki

In July 1595, an incident occurred which involved his daughter, who had been betrothed to Hidetsugu. This incident was triggered by the birth of Hideyori, a male heir, to Hideyoshi's second wife Yodo-dono. This resulted in Hidetsugu being accused of treason and forced to commit seppuku at Mount Kōya on the order of Hideyoshi, presumably to secure the inheritance of Hideyori. Besides Hidetsugu, Hideyoshi also killed Hidetsugu's wife, concubines, and children, who were also executed at Sanjogawara. Yoshiaki's daughter, Komahime, who was only 15 years old had recently married Hidetsugu, was also executed as a result. Yoshiaki begged for her life but was refused. Komahime was beheaded along with Hidetsugu's other wives and concubines, and her body was dumped in the Sanjogawara River on August 2 of the same year. Furthermore, Yoshiaki was suspected of participating in Hidetsugu's rebellion, but he was pardoned with the assistance of Tokugawa Ieyasu's intercession on his behalf. As result of the execution of Komahime, Yoshiaki's wife Osaki-dono was struck with deep grief by the sudden death of her daughter, and she died on August 16. After this incident, Yoshiaki grew closer to Ieyasu and became his strongest supporter.

In 1597, Yoshiaki's son Yoshiyasu was eventually given the official title of Shūri-daifū as the eldest son of the Mogami family.

=== Sekigahara Campaign ===
In 1600, when the Sekigahara campaign broke out between Ieyasu and his enemies led by Ishida Mitsunari, Ieyasu entrusted Yoshiaki with command of northern Oshu. On April 19, Ieyasu instructed the Nanbu, Onodera, and Akita clans to obey Yoshiaki's command, after Ieyasu turned his army back to face Mitsunari's forces on July 25, while he was at Oyama (Oyama City, Tochigi Prefecture). Yoshiaki was also informed by Ieyasu that the campaign against the Uesugi clan was cancelled. As a result, the troops that had gathered in Oshu returned to their home provinces. The Uesugi clan became emboldened and began to actively work against Ieyasu, contacting Yoshiaki and others to encourage them to join the Uesugi side.

Mogami faced a dilemma because he still supported Ieyasu, but if he did not join the Toyotomi side, there was a high possibility that he would be attacked by the Uesugi. As Yoshiaki believed in Ieyasu's victory in the Kamigata region, he tried to buy time, but in the end, the Uesugi forces invaded the Mogami territory on September 8. Yoshimichi Onodera, who was based at Yokote Castle (present-day Yokote City, Akita Prefecture), also responded to the Uesugi and invaded the Mogami territory. This resulted with now the Mogami clan withstand the invasion of battled Uesugi Kagekatsu.

The Uesugi forces which numbered more than 20,000, were invaded from the south by the main force commanded by Naoe Kanetsugu via the Kitsunegoe Highway, and from the west by the Shonai area. Because the difference in military strength between the Mogami forces and the Uesugi forces were huge, Yoshiaki requested reinforcements from Date Masamune. The message was relayed through Yoshiaki's eldest son, Yoshiyasu. Masamune decided to send reinforcements out of obligation for his mother, Yoshihime, who was a sister of Yoshiaki, and also loyalty to Ieyasu. In the same campaign, Yoshiaki aided in Date's siege of Shiroishi, and was then attacked in his own home castle of Hataya and Kaminoyama. He used geographical advantages to resist the invasions. Yoshiaki concentrated his forces in Hasedō Castle, Yamagata Castle, and Kaminoyama Castle. Naoe Kanetsugu's forces launched an all-out attack on Hasedō Castle, which was defended by 1,000 men. With the cooperation of the reinforcements sent by Yoshiaki from Yamagata Castle and the soldiers of Hasedō Castle, and their high fighting spirit, the defenders of Hasedō Castle fought well.

Based on the estimation by a team from Mogami Yoshimitsu History Museum research, on the battle ground sites along with the Uesugi clan's estimated route, and the estimation of both forces' composition, Hasedō Castle should have fallen easily. However, it was concluded that the guerrilla warfare conducted by Yoshiaki to harass the route of the Uesugi army played a role in the successful defense of the castle. The Uesugi forces were defeated in the attack on Kaminoyama Castle, and fled back to Yonezawa in disarray. It was said that at one occasion, a group of Mogami clan's ninja infiltrated the camp of Naoe Kanetsugu, stealing his battle standard, which later hoisted on the Hasedō Castle's gate, which greatly demoralized the Uesugi troops. In the 15 days of ineffective siege against the Hasedō Castle, the Uesugi troops could not capture it from the persistent Mogami forces. In the final phase of this siege, the Uesugi forces launched another all-out attack on Hasedō Castle, but with the help of Date's reinforcements, they were able to hold out against the large Uesugi forces. In the end, when information came in that Tokugawa Ieyasu emerged victorious in the main Sekigahara battle, The uesugi forces under Kanetsugu began to withdraw from Hasedō Castle. Switching positions, Yoshiaki began to pursue them, but Kanetsugu himself concentrated his riflemen to defend his retreating army, and managed to withdraw safely back to Yonezawa.

In 1601, Yoshiaki also progressively recaptured the districts of Tagawa, Kushibiki, and Yusa from the Uesugi clan. After the campaign ended, the Mogami clan was rewarded with an increase in size from 200,000 to 570,000 koku for their domain in return for their loyalty to the Eastern army during the war. (Note: Although it was accessed as 570,000 in historical records, professor Kenji Matsuo accessed that the domain were actually worth of 1,000,000 koku in worth.) This made the Yamagata domain the fifth largest in Japan at the time, excluding the land held by Tokugawa. On May 11, Ieyasu, who had established his hegemony over the Toyotomi government, visited the Imperial Palace to receive an audience with the Emperor. He was accompanied by Mogami Yoshiaki as well as Mori Tadamasa, who had been instrumental in the attack on the Sanada clan, and Ii Naomasa, who had led the vanguard in the Battle of Sekigahara, and Oda Nagamasu.

=== Edo Period ===
After the Tokugawa shogunate in Edo was established, Yoshiaki became the first ruler of the Yamagata Domain and implemented various policies. One of these was the establishment of a provincial law called the "Mogami Family Law".

During this era, Yoshiaki also attempted many construction projects such as restoring temples and shrines, including all the old temples in the Mogami clan domain that had existed since ancient times. The five-story pagoda at Mount Haguro, a national treasure, was also repaired by Yoshiaki. He also made great efforts in improving water transportation on the Mogami River. There were three difficult spots along the Mogami River, but he improved them to facilitate shipping between Kyoto and Yamagata . He also constructed a massive irrigation system (called Kitadate Ozeki) in Shonai, with a total length of over 30 kilometers, and created 4,200 hectares of vast rice fields. He followed the advice of his vassal Kitadate Toshinaga, to override opposition from those around him and give permission for the construction projects, providing financial and material support to ensure their success.

It was noted that the Yamagata Castle is notable for not having a castle tower, despite being the second largest castle north of the Kanto region after Edo Castle. According to the record "Ugenki," despite the pressure from Mogami senior vassals who urged him to build a castle tower, Yoshiaki refused to allow it, as he did not want to overwork the citizens of his territory just to build castle towers.

However, after this, the relationship between Yoshiaki and his eldest son, Yoshiyasu, deteriorated due to a power struggle between their respective vassals. As the conflict continued, Yoshiaki worried that this could led to a civil war which would potentially cause the shogunate to strip the Mogami clan's control from their regions. Therefore, he decided to pass on the family headship to his second son, Iechika. It was believed the decision was also due to Tokugawa Ieyasu's fondness for Iechika, as Ieyasu had given Iechika a character from his own name, and he was well remembered by Ieyasu. During that time, Iechika was under the service of Ieyasu's son, Tokugawa Hidetada. Yoshiaki thought that if he allowed Iechika to succeed him as head of the family, he would be able to avoid the Mogami clan being punished by the shogun. In 1605, Yoshiaki ordered Yoshiyasu to enter Mount Koya and become a monk. Yoshiyasu followed his father's orders and set off for Mount Koya, but was murdered by one of Yoshiaki's retainers on the way. It is not known whether Yoshiaki ordered Yoshiyasu's assassination. However, after the assassination, Yoshiaki made Jonenji Temple under Yamagata Castle into his family temple in order to pray for Yoshiyasu's soul.

=== Death ===
Mogami Yoshiaki died from illness at Yamagata Castle in 1614 at the age of 68. Yamagata maintains the Mogami Yoshiaki Historical Museum, just outside the rebuilt Great Eastern Gate of Yamagata Castle, which displays his helmet, battle command baton and other implements he actually used.

It was reported that during his reign as Mogami clan's head not a single local uprising occurred within the territories of Mogami clan.

== Legacy ==
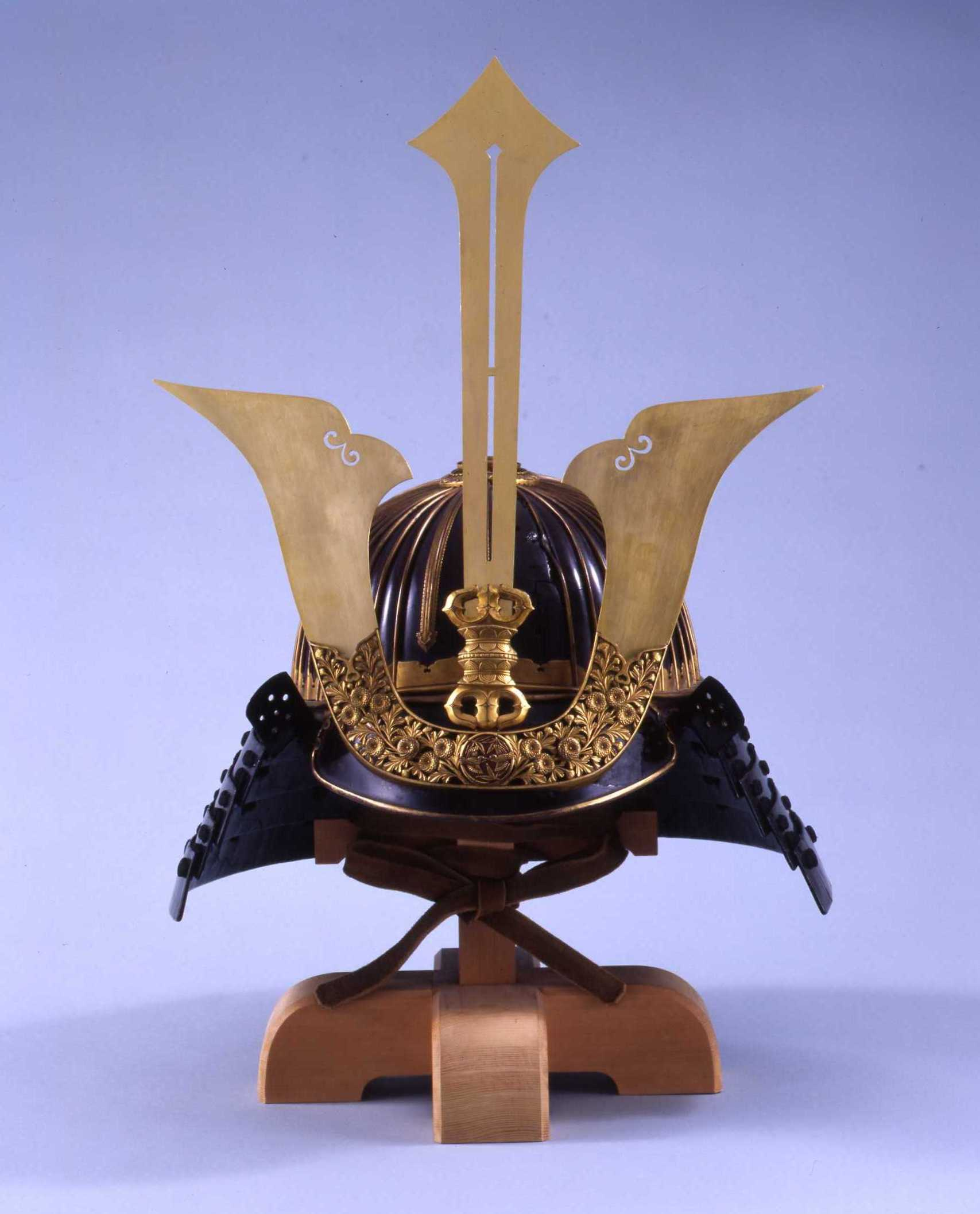
Kabuto helmet belongs to Mogami Yoshiaki

Mogami Yoshiaki laid out and built the castle town, which became the foundation of modern-day Yamagata City. He controlled the "Three Difficult Places" on the Mogami River, making navigation safer from the Sea of Japan inland, and bringing the culture of Kyōto and Ōsaka to Yamagata. His dam building projects at Kitadaseki, Inabazeki and other places, and other irrigation control measures helped develop rice cultivation in the Shōnai plain.

A museum named after Mogami Yoshiaki, who built the foundations of Yamagata city, was built by the officials of Yamagata City on December 1, 1989, to collect, preserve and study all the materials related to the Mogami clan who ruled the city from the Azuchi–Momoyama period until early Edo period.

== Notable vassals ==
- Tateoka Mitsushige
- Sakenobe Hidetsuna
- Eguchi Gohei
- Satomi Minbu
- Ujiie Sadanao
- Ujiie Munemori
- Shimura Akiyasu

== Appendix ==
=== Bibliography ===
- Stephen Turnbull. The Samurai Sourcebook. London: Cassell & Co. (1998)
- Stephen Turnbull (2012). Hatamoto: Samurai Horse and Foot Guards 1540–1724. Bloomsbury Publishing. ISBN 978-1849082518.
- Stephen Turnbull (2011). Samurai Armies 1467–1649. Volume 36 of Battle Orders. Bloomsbury Publishing. p. 85. ISBN 978-1846038174.
- Dewa no Taishu Mogami Yoshiaki (in Japanese)
- 最上義光歴史館 (2014). "最上義光歴史館" [Mogami Yoshiaki History Museum]. mogamiyoshiaki.jp (in Japanese). Otemachi, Yamagata City, Yamagata Prefecture: Mogami Yoshiaki Historical Museum.
- Kenji Matsuo (松尾剛次). "伊達と上杉の宿敵「最上義光」...梟雄と語られてきた戦国大名の知られざる素顔" [The sworn enemy of the Date and Uesugi clans, "Mogami Yoshimitsu"... The unknown face of the Sengoku lord who was described as a warlord]. Yahoo Japan (in Japanese). Rekishikaido PHP institute. Archived from the original on June 24, 2024. "Excerpts from Kenji Matsuo, Honorary Director of the Institute of Urban and Regional Studies, Yamagata University and professor at Yamagata University. PhD in Literature with medieval Japanese history and Japanese Buddhist history specialization. works on "The Birth of Funeral Buddhism," "The Unknown Shinran," and "Mogami Yoshimitsu: The Man Who Helped Ieyasu Conquer the Country.""

Preceded by none	First Daimyō of Yamagata; 1600–1614	Succeeded by Mogami Iechika
