= Siege of Shiroishi =

Conflict part of the Sengoku period

Coordinates: 38°00′09″N 140°37′02″E

- Part of the Sengoku period
Date	1600
Location	Shiroishi castle, near Sendai
Result	Eastern Army victory, Castle falls to Eastern army

Belligerents
Eastern Forces loyal to Tokugawa Ieyasu	Western Forces loyal to Ishida Mitsunari

Commanders and leaders
Date Masamune; Mogami Yoshiaki	Uesugi Kagekatsu; Naoe Kanetsugu

The siege of Shiroishi, in 1600, was one of several feudal Japanese battles leading up to the decisive battle of Sekigahara which ended the period of over 100 years of war, and was immediately followed by the establishment of the Tokugawa shogunate.

Shiroishi was a castle just south of the city of Sendai, controlled by a retainer of Uesugi Kagekatsu, who in turn was one of the chief supporters of Ishida Mitsunari.

Date Masamune and Mogami Yoshiaki, daimyō of large nearby domains, laid siege to this castle, beginning the conflict in the north between the representatives of Ishida and Tokugawa. Its capture would also mark the first contribution of Date Masamune to the Sekigahara campaign.

This would be followed by two counter-sieges on the part of Uesugi Kagekatsu and Naoe Kanetsugu against the castles of Hataya and Kaminoyama.
