= Sakenobe Hidetsuna =

Japanese samurai

- 鮭延 秀綱
- Born: 1563; Mamurogawa
- Died: 1646 (aged 82–83); Koga, Ibaraki
- Military career
- Commands: Sakenobe castle
- Conflicts: Dewa Campaign (1581-1588); Odawara Campaign (1590); Kunohe Rebellion (1591); Sekigahara campaign (1600)

Sakenobe Hidetsuna (鮭延 秀綱; 1563 – 1646) was a Japanese samurai and commander of the Sengoku period. He was a chief vassal of the Mogami clan. He was also the castle lord in command of Sakenobe castle.

In 1581, he surrendered when his Sakenobe castle was attacked by Mogami Yoshiaki and soon he became Yoshiaki's chief vassal.

In 1600, during the Battle of Sekigahara, he participated in the Siege of Hasedō. He fought against Naoe Kanetsugu of the Western Army and showed a remarkable performance as a commander.

In 1622, after Mogami clan was demolished by the Tokugawa Shogunate, he became a vassal of Doi Toshikatsu.
