= Honjō Shigenaga =

Japanese samurai

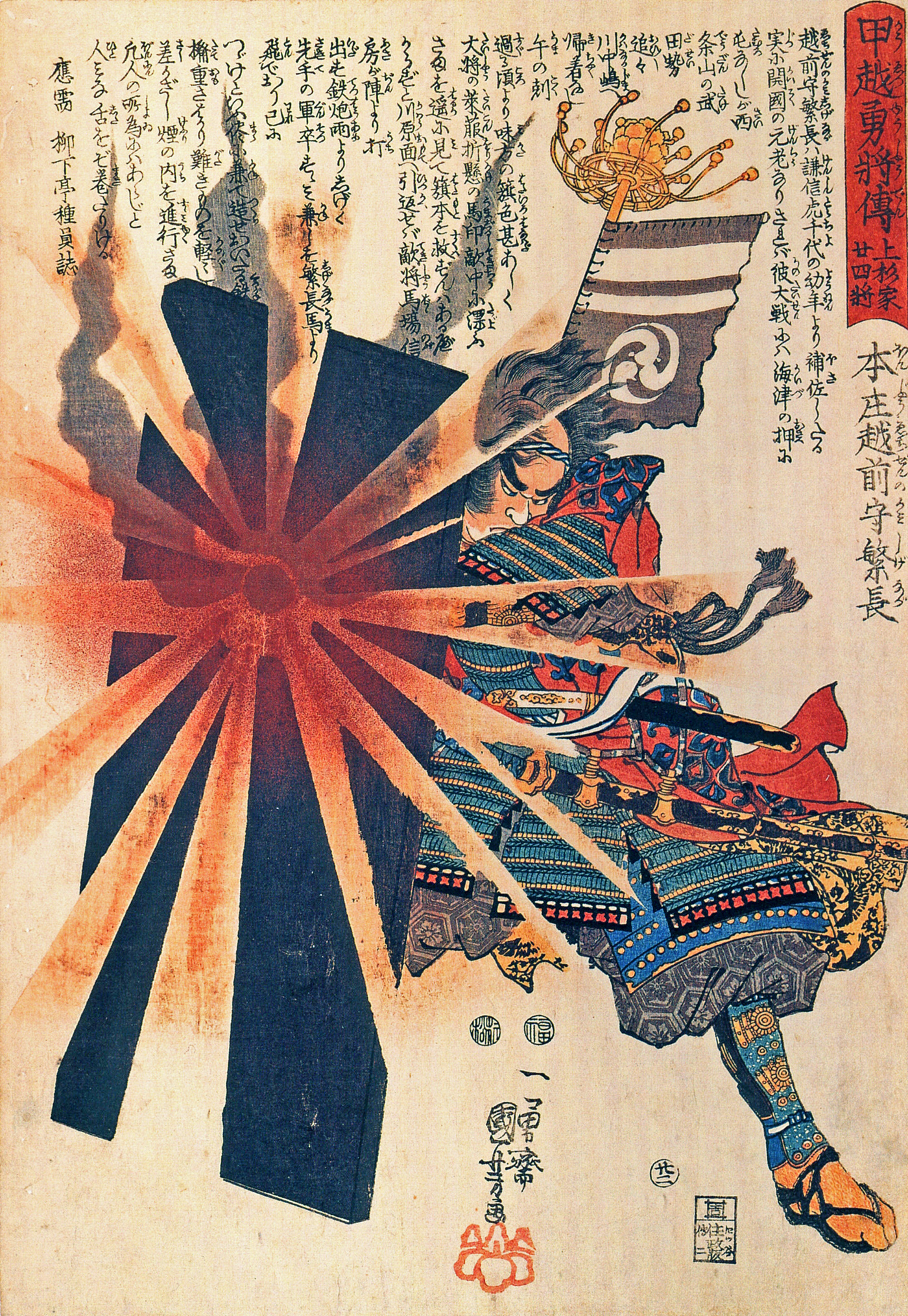
Utagawa Kuniyoshi painted Honjō Shigenaga parrying an exploding shell

Honjō Shigenaga (本庄 繁長; January 12, 1540 – January 29, 1614) was a Japanese Samurai who lived from the Azuchi–Momoyama period through to the Edo period. Shigenaga served the Uesugi clan and was known for his betrayal against them. He held the court title Echizen no kami.

== Biography ==
Shigenaga fought at the Battle of Kawanakajima as rear left wing commander, acting as Uesugi Kenshin's retainer.

However, in 1568-1569 after the Kawanakajima campaign he briefly rebelled against Kenshin and allied himself to Takeda Shingen, Kenshin's nemesis, because Shigenaga felt dissatisfied by his small reward compared with his achievement. He first murdered Nagao Fujikage, Uesugi's vassal, and captured his castle. This betrayal forced Kenshin to lay siege to Murakami castle held by Shigenaga Honjo. The conflict proved costly for Kenshin as Irobe Katsunaga, one of his generals, was slain in the battle and could not take the castle easily. In spite of his rebellion against Kenshin, which lasted for one year, Takeda Shingen did not help him and Shigenaga was forced to surrender to Kenshin under the coordination of the Ashina clan. After the siege he was pardoned by Kenshin and later fought at Battle of Tedorigawa against Oda Nobunaga Forces.

After the death of Kenshin in 1578 Shigenaga supported Uesugi Kagekatsu as successor during the Siege of Otate.

In 1588, when Mogami Yoshiaki began expanding his territory into the Shōnai region in Dewa province. Shigenaga once again entered conflict against the Mogami clan where he defeated a Mogami army at the battle of Jugorihara (十五里ヶ原の戦い). Uesugi Kagekatsu sought aid from Shigenaga. Together they successfully recovered the Shōnai region as a territory of the Uesugi clan.

In 1598, Uesugi Kagekatsu was transferred to Aizu Wakamatsu castle (Fukushima prefecture) by the Toyotomi government, and Shigenaga was transferred to the Aizu region.

== Sekigahara Campaign ==
In 1600, during the conflict between the Toyotomi loyalists, Ishida Mitsunari and Tokugawa Ieyasu, Shigenaga fought in a series of battles once again against Date Masamune and Mogami Yoshiaki at the Siege of Hasedō.

In April 1601, Shigenaga resisted an attack from Date Masamune's warriors at Battle of Matsukawa such as Katakura Kagetsuna, Oniniwa Tsunamoto and Yashiro Kageyori. Date's forces under Katakura Kagetsuna attacked several times including a defense against a rear attack, despite Date's attempt to attack from Mount Shinobu. Later on, His forces successfully killed several of Kagetsuna's famous soldiers, forcing Date Masamune to stop attacking and return whilst Shigenaga was successful in defending Fukushima Castle from the invading Ieyasu Eastern coalition.

== Honjo Masamune sword ==
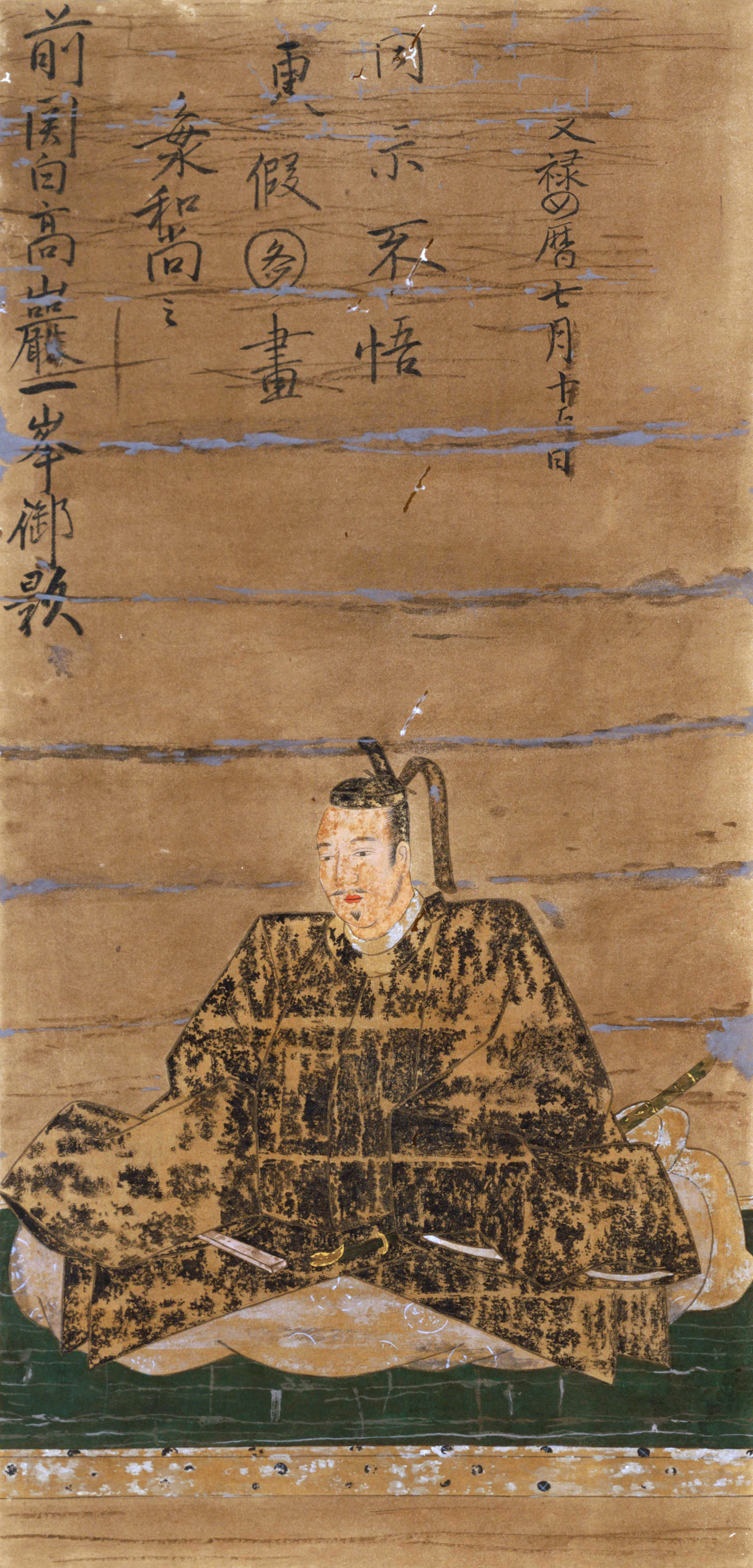
Toyotomi-Hidetsugu

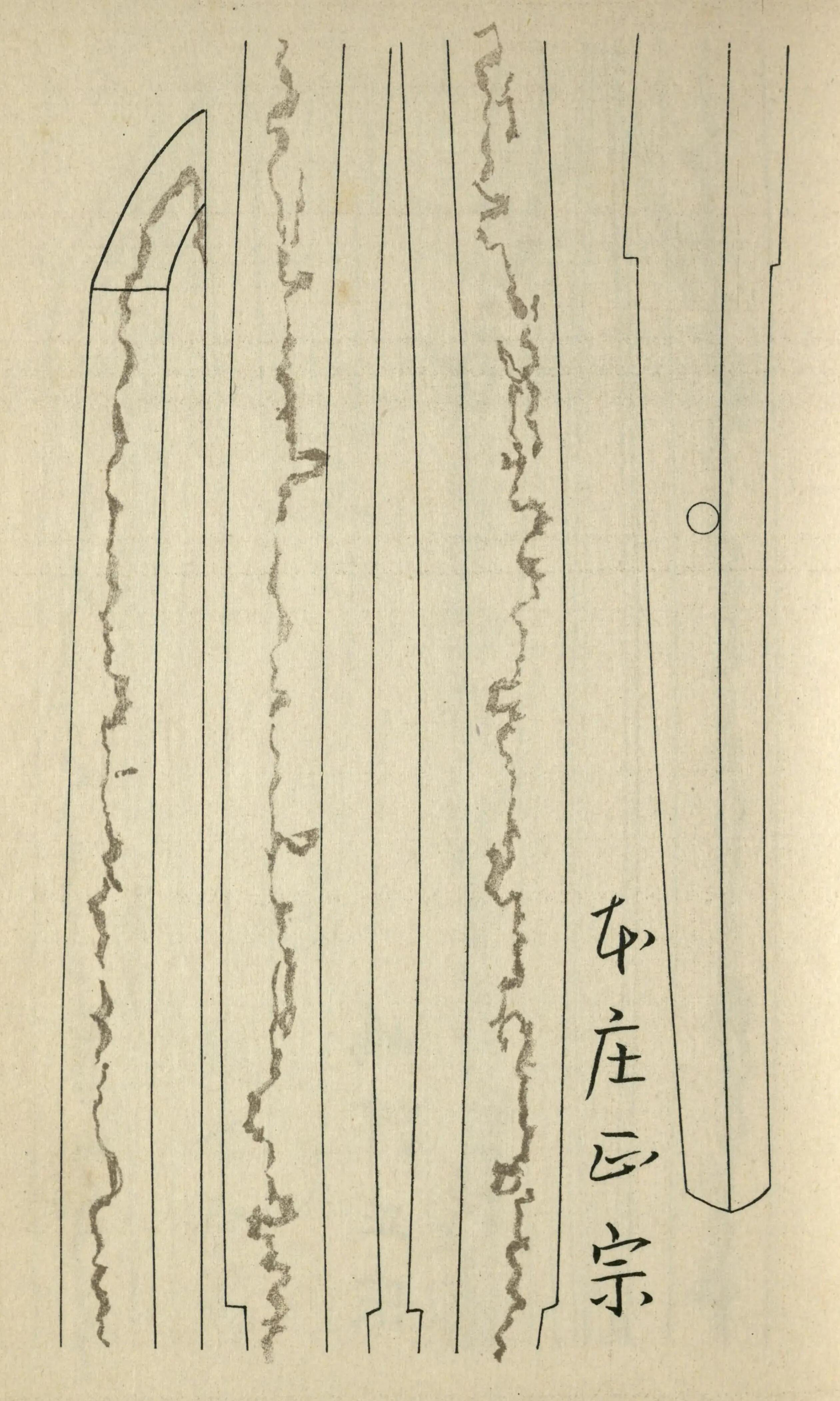
oshigata of the Honjo Masamune drawn by 17 century swordsmith Tsuguhira

Honjō Shigenaga was particularly known as the wielder of the famous sword Honjo Masamune, forged by Gorō Nyūdō Masamune (五郎入道正宗, c.1264–1343), a medieval Japanese blacksmith widely acclaimed as Japan's greatest swordsmith. Honjo Masamune is a katana representing the Shogunate during most of the Tokugawa Era. Shigenaga was attacked by Umanosuke who already possessed a number of trophy heads. Umanosuke struck Shigenaga with the Honjo Masamune which split his helmet, but he survived and took the sword as a prize.The blade had a number of chips from the great battle but was still usable. It was kept by Shigenaga he was until he was sent to Fushimi Castle, during the Bunroku era, or around 1592 to 1595. Shigenaga ran out of funds and was later forced to sell the sword to Toyotomi Hidetsugu, Toyotomi Hideyoshi's nephew and retainer. It was bought for 13 Mai, 13 ōban, which was 13 large gold coins.
