= Siege of Hasedō =

1600 siege

Coordinates: 38°12′45.6″N 140°16′20.76″E

- Part of the Sengoku period
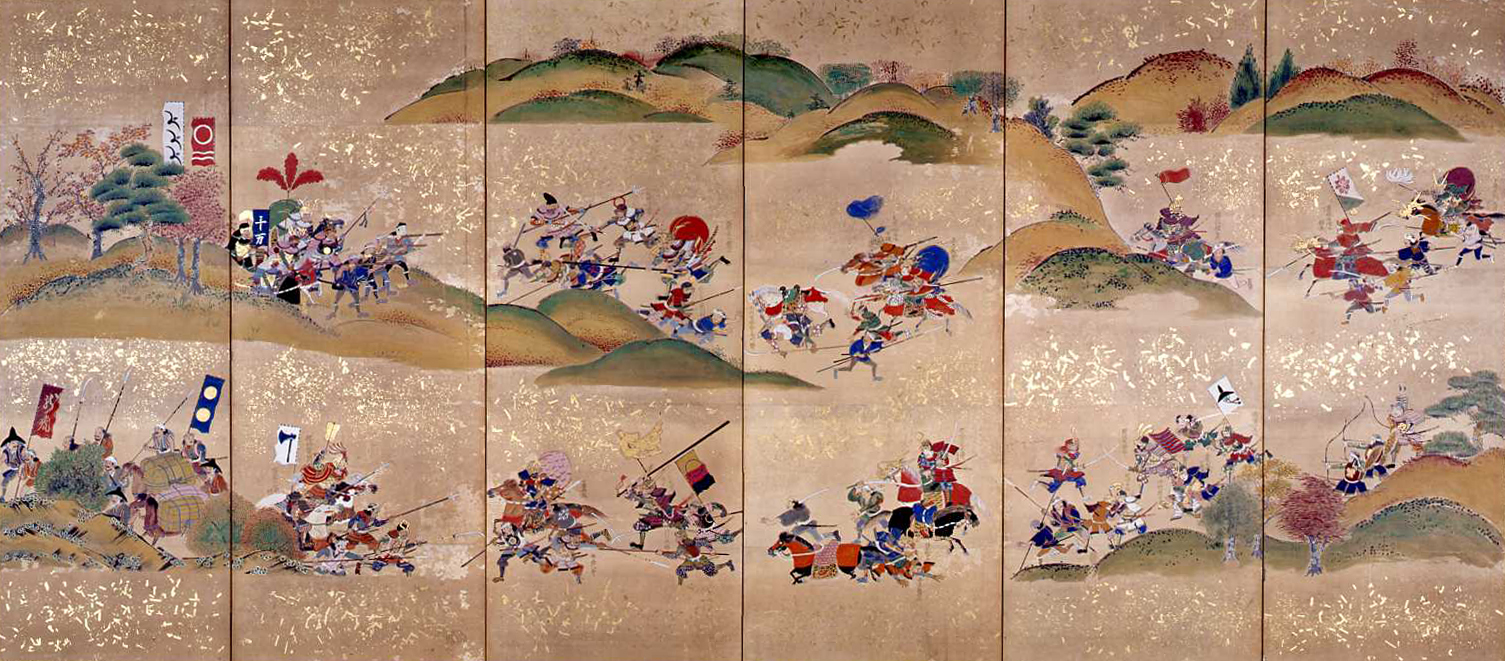
- Picture of the siege of Hasedō
Date	1600
Location	Hasedō castle, near Yamagata
Result	Eastern Army victory

Belligerents
Eastern Forces loyal to Tokugawa Ieyasu: Forces of Mogami Yoshiaki and Date Masamune	Western Forces loyal to Ishida Mitsunari: Forces of Uesugi Kagekatsu

Commanders and leaders
Mogami Yoshiaki; Shimura Takaharu; Rusu Masakage; Magoichi Saika; Sakenobe Hidetsuna; Nanbu Toshinao	Naoe Kanetsugu; Maeda Toshimasu; Suibara Chikanori; Amakasu Kagetsugu; Kasuga Mototada; Kamiizumi Yasutsuna †; Honjō Shigenaga

Strength
Mogami: 7,000; Date: 3,000	20,000

Casualties and losses
623 killed	1,580 killed

The siege of Hasedō (長谷堂城の戦い) was one of a series of battles fought in the far north of Japan's main island of Honshū (the Tōhoku region) contemporaneous with the famous and decisive campaigns between Tokugawa Ieyasu and Ishida Mitsunari further south.

== Prelude ==
Over the course of the year 1600, in the Sekigahara Campaign, Naoe Kanetsugu, a general under Uesugi Kagekatsu in the side of Ishida Mitsunari western army, would lead a campaign in Tōhoku, which included the siege of Hasedō castle, near Yamagata, which was his ultimate goal. Hasedō was held by Mogami Yoshiaki and the castle garrison led by Shimura Takaharu and backed by a Tokugawa-loyal army of the Date clan. Twenty thousand of Uesugi Kagekatsu's men moved towards Yamagata from the north, while Naoe Kanetsugu began his siege on Hasedō.

== Battle ==
Date's general Magoichi Saika decided to head for the Kagekatsu's north garrison at Yamagata Castle, as Date Masamune army under Rusu Masakage relieved his uncle in Hasedo Castle. (Date Masamune sent Rusu Masakage as his representative.)

Date's forces broke through and defeated Maeda Toshimasu the central garrison Uesugi forces, but more Uesugi reinforcements arrived to continue the siege of the castle. After Toshimasu defeat, Naoe Kanetsugu decided to head for the front lines, leaving the defense of the Uesugi north garrison to Kagekatsu; Having received reinforcements of 100 horsemen and 200 arquebusiers, he laid siege to Hasedō for fourteen days before Date Masamune forces arrived to relieve the castle.

Rusu Masakage led the relief force to the castle and defeated Uesugi's force led by Suibara Chikanori and Amakasu Kagetsugu as they attempted to penetrate the castle's defenses.

Sakenobe Hidetsuna joined Hasedō castle as reinforcement under the order of Mogami Yoshiaki. He started a night attack upon the military camps of the Uesugi clan and damaged them.

The castle was finally relieved by Date forces, causing Naoe Kanetsugu to declare an all-out attack on Hasedō. Kasuga Mototada was the vanguard, and charged the castle, but was forced to retreat due to heavy arquebus fire.

After Uesugi forces failed, Maeda Toshimasu was appointed to lead the Uesugi rear guard during the retreat. Later, an army from the Hasedo castle garrison charged north and then began attacking the retreating Uesugi's forces. Rusu Masakage pushed on towards the Uesugi main camp, and Kanetsugu made preparations to withdraw to the southwest. Maeda Toshimasu reappeared in an attempt to guard Kanetsugu's retreat, but Masakage reached both of them at the main camp. He first defeated Toshimasu, and he then proceeded to defeat Kanetsugu before he could escape.

However, in November 5, news arrived of Tokugawa Ieyasu's victory at the Battle of Sekigahara, and so Naoe called a full withdrawal of all his forces back to Yonezawa, putting an end to Uesugi's campaigns in the north.

A small besieging force remained, and fighting continued, in which Naoe's general Kamiizumi Yasutsuna was killed.
