= Hataya Castle =

Castle in Japan

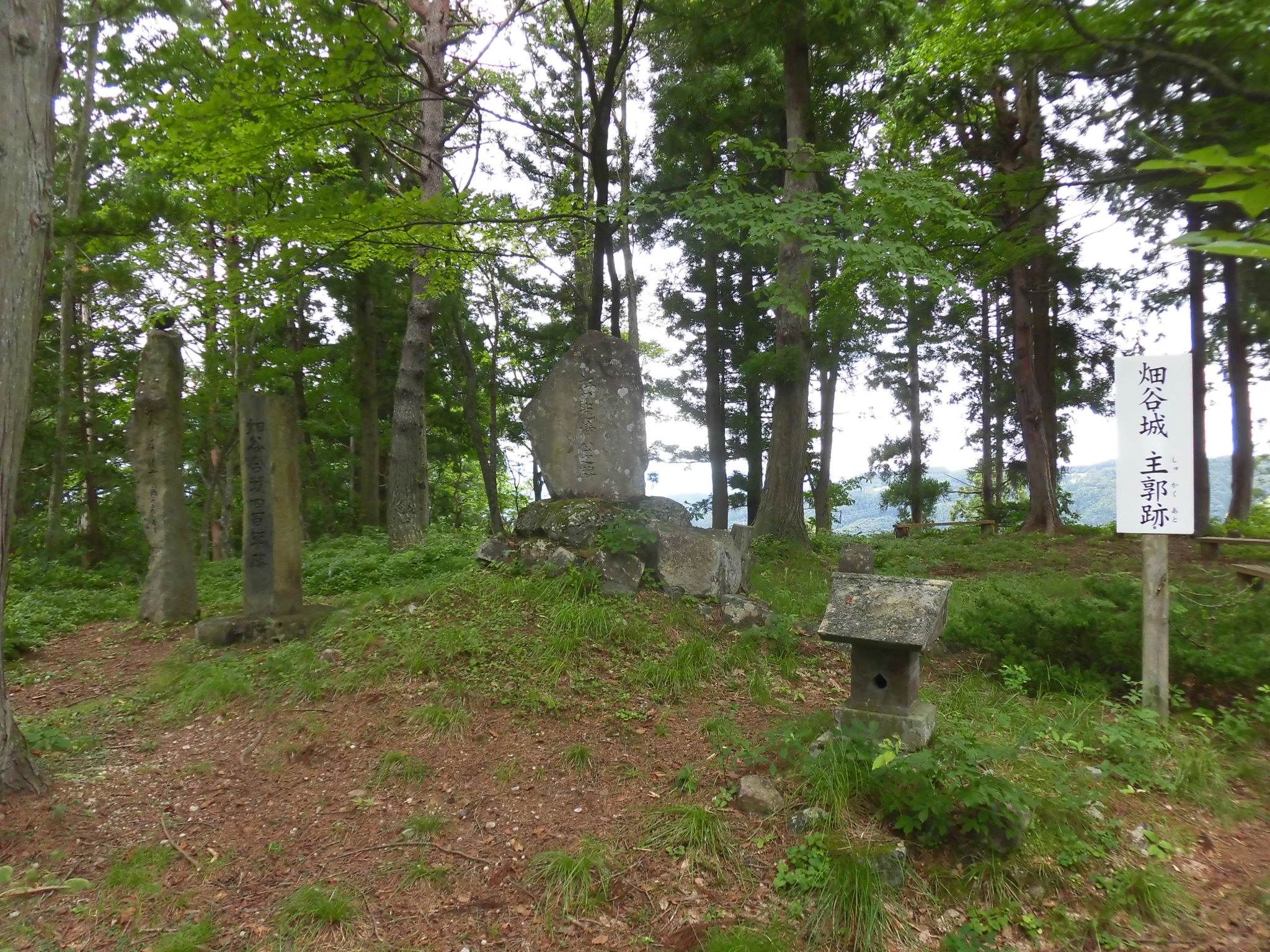
Site of Hataya Castle

Hataya Castle (畑谷城, Hataya-jō) was a castle built in Dewa Province, Japan. It is located in the town of Yamanobe in the Higashimurayama District of Yamagata Prefecture. It was the location of the Siege of Hataya in 1600, during which the castle's garrison of 300 men led by Eguchi Gohei was besieged by a 20,000 man force led by Naoe Kanetsugu. The garrison was defeated after a short siege.

== Sources ==
- Turnbull, Stephen (2003). Japanese Castles 1540-1640 (Fortress). Osprey Publishing. ISBN 978-1-84176-429-0
- http://www.samurai-archives.com/uesugiret.html
