= Amakasu (disambiguation) =

The Amakasu clan was a minor Japanese clan of the Sengoku period.

Amakasu may also refer to:

- "Akamasu retainer clan", a fictional group in Total War: Shogun 2
- "Akamasu clan", a fictional group of non-player characters in role-playing games
- Amakasu incident, in which Japanese soldiers beat three high-profile anarchists after the Great Kanto earthquake in 1923
