= Tateoka Mitsushige =

Japanese samurai (1547–1639)

- 楯岡 満茂
- Born: 1547; Murayama, Uzen Province
- Died: 1639 (aged 91–92); Maebashi
- Military career
- Commands: Honjō Castle
- Conflicts: Dewa Campaign (1580-1588); Odawara Campaign (1590); Kunohe Rebellion (1591); Sekigahara campaign (1600)

Tateoka Mitsushige (楯岡 満茂; 1547 – 1639) also well known as Honjō Mitsushige was a Japanese samurai and commander of the Sengoku period. He was a senior retainer of the Mogami clan and earned highest salary among the samurai of the Mogami clan. He was the castle lord in command of Tateoka castle and Honjō castle.

In 1586, He and Mogami Yoshiaki's eldest son, Mogami Yoshiyasu, succeed defeat the Onodera Yoshimichi reinforcement.

After Mogami clan was demolished by the Tokugawa Shogunate in 1622, he served Sakai Tadayo as a guest samurai. His tomb is at Chōshō-ji Temple in Maebashi.
