= Siege of Hataya =

1600 siege in Japan

- Part of the Sengoku period
Date	8th day, 9th lunar month, 1600
Location	Hataya Castle, Yamagata Prefecture, Dewa Province, Japan
Result	Uesugi victory
Territorial changes	Castle falls to Western Army

Belligerents
Western Army; Uesugi clan forces	Eastern Army; Mogami Yoshiaki garrison forces

Commanders and leaders
Naoe Kanetsugu	Eguchi Gohei

Strength
20,000	300

The siege of Hataya was one of several battles in Japan's Tōhoku region which served as preludes to the decisive Sekigahara Campaign which would end the 250-year period of war known as Sengoku.

== Siege ==
Naoe Kanetsugu, Uesugi Kagekatsu's general loyal to Ishida Mitsunari, attacked Hataya castle on his way to pursue Mogami Yoshiaki at Yamagata Domain, His force was 20,000 strong, against the 300 man of Mogami garrison under Eguchi Gohei. The garrison have come to be celebrated in various chronicles for their brief, but brave, defense against such incredible odds.
