= Kunohe Castle =

Castle in Iwate Prefecture, Japan

- 九戸城
- Ninohe, Iwate Prefecture, Japan
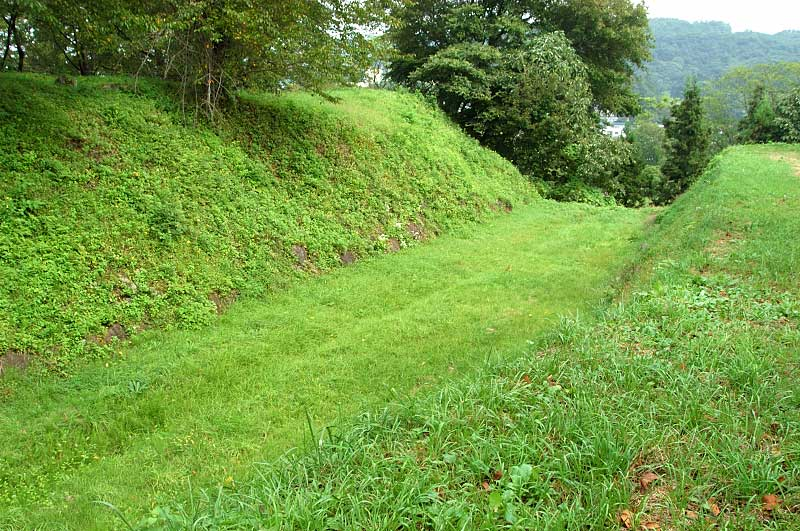
- Remnants of dry moats at ruins of Kunohe Castle

Site information
- Type: hirayama-style Japanese castle
- Open to the public: yes
- Condition: ruins

Location
- Kunohe Castle Kunohe Castle (Japan)
- Coordinates: 40°16′00″N 141°18′13″E

Site history
- Built: Muromachi period
- Built by: unknown
- In use: Sengoku period
- Demolished: 1636

Kunohe Castle (九戸城, Kunohe-jō) was a Japanese castle controlled by the Nanbu clan located in what is now the city of Ninohe, Iwate Prefecture, in the Tōhoku region of far northern Japan. It was also referred to as Fukuoka Castle (福岡城, Fukuoka-jō) or Miyano Castle (宮野城, Miyano-jō).

== Description ==
Kunohe Castle was a hirayama-style castle built on a river terrace overlooking a junction between the Mabechi River, Shiratori River and a small branch of the Shiratori River, which formed part of its natural defences to the north, west and east. The site covers an area of 340,000 square meters, making it one of the largest castle ruins in the Tōhoku region.

As with similar contemporary castles (such as Ne Castle), the fortifications at Kunohe consisted of a number of dry moats, creating a number of enclosures, each with its own earthen ramparts: the main bailey, second bailey, and there smaller baileys (Matsunomaru, Ishizawadate, and Wakasadate). The entrance to the south was protected by a wide dry moat, and the area of the enclosures was over 500 square meters.

== History ==
The date of the castle's foundation is unknown. The Nanbu clan was originally a branch of the Takeda clan from Kai Province and was awarded estates in the far northern Tōhoku region during the Kamakura period, but actively began controlling the area after the start of the Muromachi period. The Kunohe clan was a branch of the main Nanbu clan, and extensively rebuilt pre-existing fortifications around 1492-1501 AD.

Following a succession dispute in 1590, Kunohe Masazane rose in rebellion against the Nanbu Nobunao, chieftain of the main Nanbu clan, who had the backing of Toyotomi Hideyoshi. In the Kunohe Rebellion of 1591, the greatly outnumbered defenders of the castle surrendered to an army led by Gamō Ujisato; however, the peace terms were a ruse, and after surrendering the defenders were all massacred in the second bailey of the castle.

The castle was initially rebuilt by Gamō Ujizane; however, Nanbu Naonobu chose to make Sannohe Castle his seat in 1597 and by 1636 the castle was allowed to fall into ruins.

On June 7, 1935, the ruins were proclaimed a National Historic Site by the Japanese government. The castle was listed as one of the Continued Top 100 Japanese Castles in 2017.

== See also ==
- List of Historic Sites of Japan (Iwate)

== Literature ==
- Schmorleitz, Morton S. (1974). Castles in Japan. Tokyo: Charles E. Tuttle Co. pp. 144–145. ISBN 0-8048-1102-4.
- Motoo, Hinago (1986). Japanese Castles. Tokyo: Kodansha. p. 200 pages. ISBN 0-87011-766-1.
- Mitchelhill, Jennifer (2004). Castles of the Samurai: Power and Beauty. Tokyo: Kodansha. p. 112 pages. ISBN 4-7700-2954-3.
- Turnbull, Stephen (2003). Japanese Castles 1540-1640. Osprey Publishing. p. 64 pages. ISBN 1-84176-429-9.
