= Amakasu Kagetsugu =

Amakasu Kagetsugu (甘糟 景継; 1550 - June 22, 1611) was a samurai officer who served the Uesugi clan.

Under the orders of Uesugi Kenshin, Kagetsugu became the head of the Amakasu clan. Kagetsugu was known as a valiant warrior, and was skilled in wielding swords as well as spears. He is also said to have contributed to the Uesugi clan's occupation of Dewa.

He, participated in the Siege of Hasedo during the Sekigahara Campaign (1600).

== Popular culture ==
He is also one of the computer gaming characters in Total War: Shogun 2.
