= Yamagata Domain =

Japanese historical estate in Dewa province

Yamagata Domain 山形藩
- Domain of Japan
- 1600–1871
- Capital: Yamagata Castle
  - Type: Daimyō
- Historical era: Edo period
  - Established: 1600
  - Disestablished: 1871
Preceded by	Succeeded by
Dewa Province	Sakata Prefecture; Asahiyama Domain
- Today part of: Yamagata Prefecture

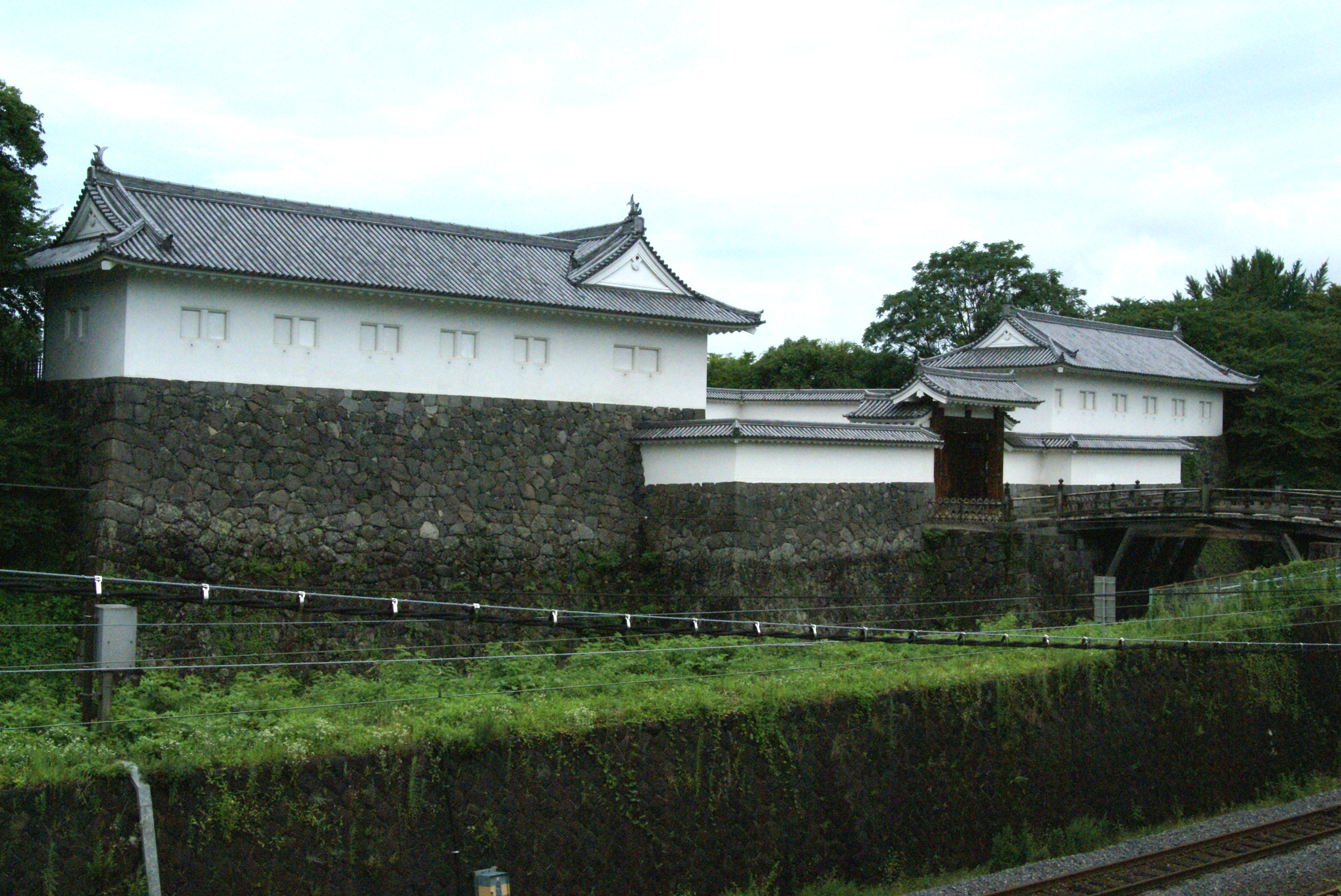
Restored East Gate of Yamagata Castle, administrative center of Yamagata Domain

Yamagata Domain (山形藩, Yamagata-han) was a feudal domain in Edo period Japan, located in Dewa Province (modern-day Yamagata Prefecture), Japan. It was centered on Yamagata Castle in what is now the city of Yamagata. Unlike some han whose control was relatively stable throughout the Edo period (1603–1867), Yamagata changed hands a great number of times during its history.

== History ==
Much of Dewa Province was controlled by the powerful Mogami clan during the Sengoku period. After Toyotomi Hideyoshi assigned the Uesugi clan to Aizu, senior Uesugi retainer Naoe Kanetsugu established himself at the neighboring Yonezawa Domain, with an army of 20,000 and gradually expanded his control north into Mogami territory. However, with the help of the Date clan under Date Masamune, the Mogami were able to defend Yamagata until Naoe was forced to withdraw following the defeat of the pro-Toyotomi forces at the Battle of Sekigahara.

During the Tokugawa shogunate, in 1600, the Mogami were initially confirmed in their holdings, with an assessed income of 570,000 koku, which was the 5th largest domain in Japan at the time. However, with after the death of Mogami Yoshiaki, the clan underwent a number of inheritance struggles, and was dispossessed by the Tokugawa shogunate, and a much reduced Yamagata Domain (220,000 koku) was then assigned to the Torii clan in 1622. Torii Tadatsune died without an heir in 1636, and Yamagata was reassigned to Hoshina Masayuki (with a further reduction to 200,000 koku) until he was assigned to rule Aizu Domain in 1643.

Reduced further to 150,000 koku, and then to 100,000 koku and finally to 60,000 koku, domain was then ruled by several branches of the Matsudaira clan or the Okudaira clan, subsidiary branches of the shogunal Tokugawa clan from 1643 to 1764. The domain had a population of 13,032 people in 2157 households per the 1697 census. The domain maintained its primary residence (kamiyashiki) in Edo at Daimyō-kōji, in Marunouchi.

In 1767, Yamagata Domain was assigned to the Akimoto clan, formerly of Kawagoe Domain, who ruled for four generations until 1845. During the Bakumatsu period, the domain was assigned to its final rulers, the Mizuno clan. It was now reduced to only 50,000 koku. Mizuno Tadakiyo served as Jisha-bugyō and wakadoshiyori in the shogunal administration and in 1862, became a rōjū in the service of Shōgun Tokugawa Iemochi.

During the Boshin War, Yamagata Domain was a member of the Ōuetsu Reppan Dōmei; although its final daimyō, Mizuno Tadahiro was only 13 years old. The domain switched sides to the pro-Imperial forces in June 1869.

The new Meiji government seized the domain, and exiled Mizuno Tadahiro to a newly created 50,000 koku Asahiyama Domain in Ōmi Province in 1870. With the abolition of the han system in July 1871, the former Yamagata Domain became the nucleus of the new Yamagata Prefecture.

== List of daimyōs ==
#	Name	Tenure	Courtesy title	Court Rank	kokudaka
Mogami clan (tozama) 1600–1622
1	Mogami Yoshiaki (最上義光)	1571–1622	Dewa-no-kami (出羽守); Sakon'e-shōshō (左近衛権少将)	Upper 4th (従四位上)	570,000 koku
2	Mogami Iechika (最上家親)	1628–1656	Suruga-no-kami (駿河守); Jijū (侍従)	4th (従四位)	570,000 koku
3	Mogami Ietoshi (最上義俊)	1656–1704	-none-	-none-	570,000 koku
Torii clan (fudai) 1622–1636
1	Torii Tadamasa (鳥居忠政)	1622–1628	Sakyō-no-suke (左京亮)	Lower 4th (従四位下)	220,000 --> 240,000 koku
2	Torii Tadatsune (鳥居忠恒)	1628–1636	Sakyō-no-suke (左京亮)	Lower 4th (従四位下)	240,000 koku
Hoshina clan (shinpan) 1636–1643
1	Hoshina Masayuki (保科正之)	1636–1643	Sakon'e-chujō (左近衛中将)	Lower 4th (従四位下)	200,000 koku
Matsudaira clan (Echizen) (shinpan) 1644–1648
1	Matsudaira Naomoto (松平直基)	1644–1648	Yamato-no-kami (大和守); Jijū (侍従)	Lower 4th (従四位下)	150,000 koku
Matsudaira clan (Okadaira) (shinpan) 1644–1668
1	Matsudaira Tadahiro (松平忠弘)	1648–1668	Shimōsa-no-kami (下総守); Jijū (侍従)	Lower 4th (従四位下)	150,000 koku
Okudaira clan (fudai) 1668–1685
1	Okudaira Masayoshi (奥平昌能)	1668–1672	Daizen-no-suke (大膳亮)	Lower 5th (従五位下)	90,000 koku
2	Okudaira Masaakira (奥平昌章)	1672–1685	Mimasaka-no-kami (美作守)	Lower 5th (従五位下)	90,000 koku
Hotta clan (fudai) 1685–1686
1	Hotta Masanaka (堀田正仲)	1685–1686	Shimōsa-no-kami (下総守);	Lower 4th (従四位下)	150,000 koku
Matsudaira clan (Echizen) (shinpan) 1686–1692
1	Matsudaira Naonori (松平直矩)	1686–1692	Yamato-no-kami (大和守); Jijū (侍従)	Lower 4th (従四位下)	90,000 koku
Matsudaira clan (Okadaira) (shinpan) 1692–1700
1	Matsudaira Tadahiro (松平忠弘)	1692–1692	Shimōsa-no-kami (下総守); Jijū (侍従)	Lower 4th (従四位下)	100,000 koku
2	Matsudaira Tadamasa (松平忠雅)	1692–1700	Shimōsa-no-kami (下総守)	Lower 5th (従五位下)	100,000 koku
Hotta clan (fudai) 1700–1729
1	Hotta Masanaka (堀田正虎)	1700–1729	Izu-no-kami (伊豆守);	Lower 4th (従四位下)	100,000 koku
2	Hotta Masaharu (堀田正春)	1729–1731	Sagami-no-kami (相模守)	Lower 4th (従四位下)	100,000 koku
3	Hotta Masasuke (堀田正亮)	1731–1746	Shimōsa-no-kami (下総守); Jijū (侍従)	Lower 4th (従四位下)	100,000 koku
Matsudaira clan (Ogyu) (fudai) 1746–1764
1	Matsudaira Norisuke (松平(大給)乗佑)	1746–1764	Izumi-no-kami (和泉守)	Lower 5th (従五位下)	60,000 koku
tenryō 1764–1767
Akimoto clan (fudai) 1767–1845
1	Akimoto Sukemoto (秋元涼朝)	1767–1768	Tajima-no-kami (但馬守)	Lower 4th (従四位下)	60,000 koku
2	Akimoto Tsunemoto (秋元永朝)	1768–1810	Tajima-no-kami (但馬守)	Lower 4th (従四位下)	60,000 koku
3	Akimoto Hisamoto (秋元久朝)	1810–1839	Tajima-no-kami (但馬守)	Lower 4th (従四位下)	60,000 koku
4	Akimoto Yukimoto (秋元志朝)	1839–1845	Tajima-no-kami (但馬守)	Lower 4th (従四位下)	60,000 koku
Mizuno clan (fudai) 1845–1870
1	Mizuno Tadakiyo (水野忠精)	1845–1866	Izumi-no-kami (和泉守); Jijū (侍従)	Lower 4th (従四位下)	50,000 koku
2	Mizuno Tadahiro (水野忠弘)	1866–1870	Tajima-no-kami (但馬守)	4th (従四位)	50,000 koku
