= Siege of Kaminoyama =

- Part of the Sekigahara Campaign
Date	1600
Location	Kaminoyama, Yamagata province
Result	Uesugi victory
Territorial changes	Kaminoyama falls to western forces

Belligerents
Western army forces: Uesugi clan forces	Eastern Army forces: Mogami clan garrison

Commanders and leaders
Honmura Chikamori †; Yokota Munetoshi	Satomi Minbu

Strength
4,000	

The siege of Kaminoyama took place in 1600, at the end of Japan's Sengoku period. It was one of many battles making up the Sekigahara Campaign, in which Tokugawa Ieyasu eliminated the last opposition to his domination of the Japanese islands.

Honmura Chikamori and Yokota Munetoshi, commanders under Naoe Kanetsugu, led 4,000 men against the castle of Kaminoyama in Yamagata province while Naoe led another division towards the province. Kaminoyama was held by Satomi Minbu, a retainer of the Mogami clan which was aligned with Tokugawa. Honmura was killed in the fighting, but in the end the castle fell to the Uesugi forces.
