= Mogami Yoshimori =

Japanese samurai (1520–1590)

- 最上 義守

Head of Mogami clan
- In office 1522–1571
- Preceded by: Mogami Yoshisada
- Succeeded by: Mogami Yoshiaki

Personal details
- Born: 1520 Nakano Castle (Dewa Province)
- Died: June 19, 1590 (aged 69–70) Ryumoni-ji Temple
- Children: Mogami Yoshiaki; Lady Yoshi

Military service
- Allegiance: Mogami clan
- Rank: Daimyo
- Commands: Yamagata Castle

Mogami Yoshimori (最上 義守; 1520 – 1590) was a Japanese samurai and 10th head of the Mogami clan.

His daughter Lady Yoshi married Date Terumune and gave birth to Date Masamune.
