= Nagao Fujikage =

Nagao Fujikage (長尾 藤景; d. 1568) was a samurai of the Nagao clan who served under Uesugi Kenshin during Japan's Sengoku period. He was counted among Kenshin's Twenty-Eight Generals.

He fought on the left flank at the fourth Battle of Kawanakajima in 1561.

In 1568, Honjō Shigenaga murdered Fujikage, and captured his castle.
