= Yashiro Kageyori =

Early Edo period Japanese samurai and warden of Iwadeyama

Yashiro Kageyori (屋代 景頼) (1563–1608) was a Japanese samurai of the Azuchi-Momoyama period through the early Edo period. He served the Date clan during the tenure of Date Masamune as lord. Kageyori was also known as Genzaburō (源三郎) and Kageyuhyōe (勘解由兵衛).

Despite the abolishment of the Yashiro family during Kageyori's father Shuri's headship, Masamune allowed Kageyori to revive it. Kageyori was given many jobs surrounding repression of dissent. These included killing Masamune's younger brother Kojirō (he refused), hunting down the remnants of the Ōsaki and Kasai uprisings, and taking Date Shigezane's residence by force. During Masamune's time in Korea, Kageyori was made warden of Iwadeyama.

However, his haughty attitude came in conflict with other retainers, and 1607, on the pretext of having killed a peasant who was making a tax payment, Kageyori was exiled from the new Sendai han, and his family abolished. He wandered Kamakura and Ōmi Province for some time, dying in Ōmi in 1608.

After Kageyori's exile, his son Yashiro Saburōbei was taken on by Date Shigezane as a retainer.

== Popular culture ==
Kageyori appears as a non-playable character in the video game Samurai Warriors.
