= Amakasu clan =

Japanese clan of the Sengoku period

The Amakasu clan (甘粕氏·甘糟氏 , Amakasu-shi) was a minor Japanese clan of the Sengoku period. Originally from Echigo Province, they were led to oblige the powerful Nagao clan and later the Uesugi clan. In the 16th century Amakasu Kagemochi was forced to fight for Uesugi Kenshin. After his death in 1578, descendants of Kagemochi continued to serve the Uesugi during the Edo period. Under the orders of Uesugi Kenshin, Uesugi samurai officer, Amakasu Kagetsugu, became the head of the Amakasu clan.
