= Yamagata Castle =

Castle in Yamagata Prefecture, Japan

Coordinates: 38°15′12.84″N 140°19′44.56″E

- 山形城
- Yamagata, Yamagata Prefecture, Japan
- Restored East Gate of Yamagata Castle

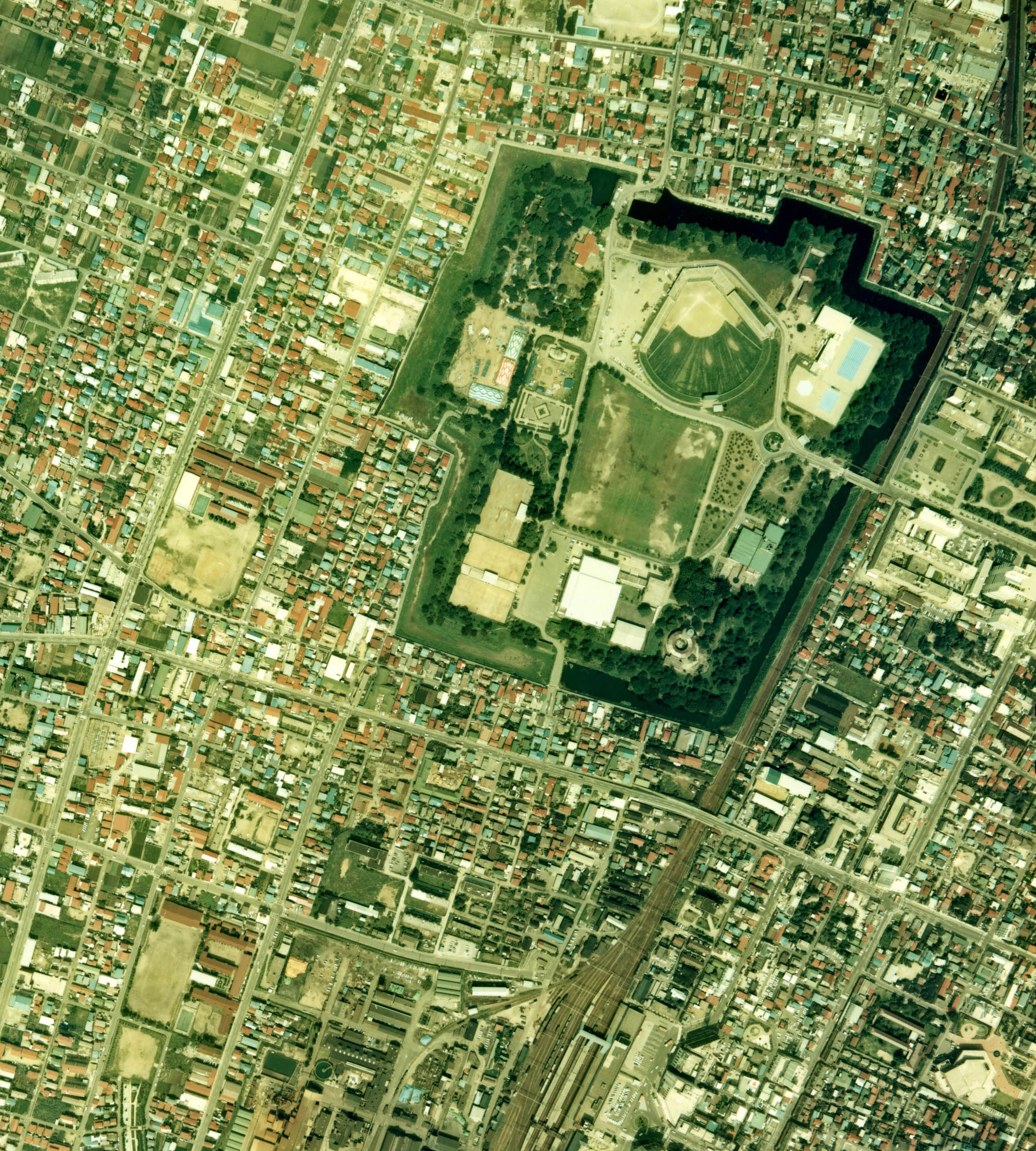
- Yamagata Castle from the air, 1972

Site information
- Type: flatland-style Japanese castle
- Open to the public: yes

Location
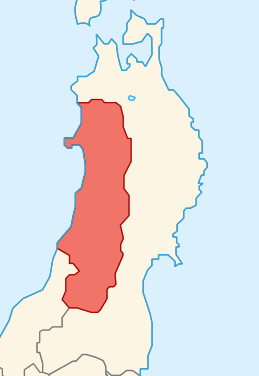
- Location within Yamagata Prefecture Location within Dewa, Japan Location within Japan

Site history
- Built: 1357
- Built by: Mogami Yoshiaki
- In use: 1357-1889

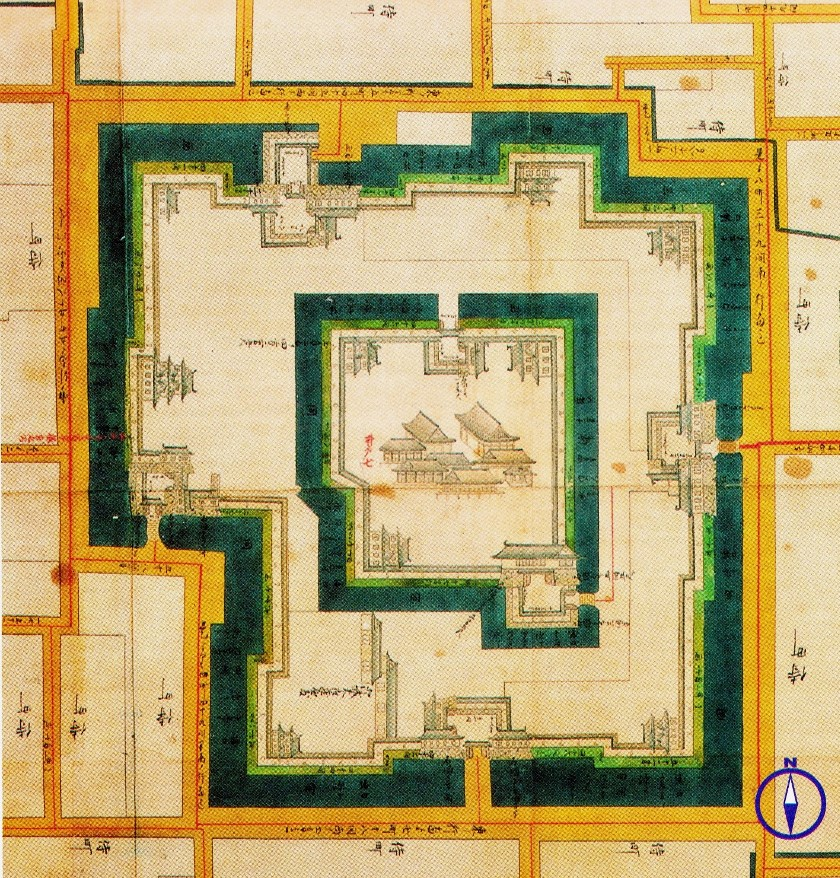
Layout of Yamagata Castle

Yamagata Castle (山形城, Yamagata-jō) is a flatland-style Japanese castle located in the center of the city of Yamagata, eastern Yamagata Prefecture, Japan. Throughout the Edo period, Yamagata Castle was the headquarters for the daimyō of Yamagata Domain. The castle was also known as "Ka-jō" (霞城). The castle grounds are protected as a National Historic Site by the Japanese government.

== Overview ==
The Yamagata Basin is a long and narrow inland valley of the Mogami River bounded by the Ōu Mountains to the east. It is an important communications center for the southeastern portion of the Tōhoku region of Japan, connecting the Shōnai Plains and the Sea of Japan to the west with the Yonezawa Basin to the south, and the Sendai Plains and the Pacific Ocean across the Ōu Mountains. In addition to riverine traffic, the route of the Ushū Kaidō highway also passes through the area. Yamagata Castle is located at the southern end of the Yamagata Basin.

== History ==
=== Early history ===
The first castle on this site dates to the middle of the Muromachi period, when Shiba Kaneyori established himself as lord of the surrounding area of Dewa Province and built a fortified residence on the site of what is now the inner bailey of Yamagata Castle. The Shiba clan was a strong supporter of the Ashikaga shogunate and the Northern Court. Shiba Kaneyori later changed his surname to "Mogami", and the Mogami clan continued to rule for about 275 years. However, by the Sengoku period, the Mogami had lost much of their power due to a succession of internal conflicts and short-lived leaders. The aggressive Date clan invaded Mogami territory and after a series of battles, reduced the Mogami to a subordinate position. However, the Date clan itself then fell victim to internal political conflicts. Taking advantage of the situation, Mogami Yoshimori regained his independence, and married his daughter to Date Terumune. Their son was Date Masamune, and this relationship provided security for the Mogami clan.

Mogami Yoshimori's eldest son, Mogami Yoshiaki fought many battle against various cadet branches of his own clan as well as the local warlords of many strongholds across Dewa Province from his base at Yamagata, with the Date clan sometimes assisting, but more often hindering his efforts to unit the province. However, following an invasion by Uesugi Kagekatsu, who captured the Shōnai region, Yoshiaki was forced to submit to Toyotomi Hideyoshi. Yoshiaki rebuilt Yamagata Castle in 1592, adding a second bailey and third bailey, and a number of two-story and three-story yagura watchtowers. The castle never had a tenshu. He also laid out the jōkamachi for what later became the city of Yamagata. However, his relations with the Toyotomi were always strained, as the Toyotomi favored the Uesugi clan, and Mogami Yoshiaki's daughter Komahime was killed by Hideyoshi when he purged Toyotomi Hidetsugu and his household. At the time of the Sekigahara campaign, Mogami Yoshiaki sided with Tokugawa Ieyasu. The forces of the Uesugi clan under Naoe Kanetsugu invaded the Yonezawa basin. Despite being severely outnumbered, the Mogami were able to repulse the invasion. The Mogami were rewarded after the establishment of the Tokugawa shogunate with an increase in territory to 570,000 koku with the recovery of the Shōnai region. This led to a further expansion of Yamagata Castle.

However, after the death of Yoshiaki in 1614, an internal conflict erupted between his major retainers, providing an excuse for attainder of the domain by the shogunate in 1622.

=== Later history ===
The Tokugawa shogunate broke up the Mogami domain into many smaller territories. In 1622, Yamagata Caste was awarded to Torii Tadamune, the son of Torii Mototada who had heroically died at the Battle of Fushimi Castle near Kyoto at the time of the Battle of Sekigahara. However, he was relocated to Takatō Castle in Echigo Province in 1636, and the castle and Yamagata Domain passed through a large number of daimyō clans, often for less than a single generation, and its revenues were severely reduced. With their reduced revenues, these daimyō could not afford to maintain this huge a castle and the by the middle of the Edo period, the main bailey was allowed to fall into ruins, the second bailey was used as the residence of the daimyō, and the western half of the third bailey was plowed up for farmland. The castle was in the hands of a cadet branch the Mizuno clan at the time of the Meiji restoration.

With the abolition of the han system in 1871, Yamagata Domain became Yamagata Prefecture, and in 1872 the castle grounds were sold to the government, and were used as a base for the Imperial Japanese Army’s 32nd Infantry Regiment. Many sakura were planted around the castle grounds in 1906 to commemorate the Russo-Japanese War. After World War II the site of the castle became Kajō Park, containing the Yamagata Prefectural Museum. The East Gate of the castle and the site of castle keep were restored in 1986, and the Higashi Otemon Gate of the second bailey was restored in 1991. In 2004 the stonework of the Inchimon Gate was restored, and a bridge leading to main bailey was reconstructed in 2006. Renovations and archaeological investigations are ongoing, and Yamagata City plans to restore as much of the castle as possible to its early Edo-period condition by the year 2033. The castle was listed as one of the 100 Fine Castles of Japan by the Japanese Castle Foundation (日本城郭協会, Nihon Jōkaku Kyōkai) in 2006.

== Structure ==
Yamagata Castle consists of three concentric square areas. The inner bailey is 200 meters square, was protected by clay walls and wet moats, and had gates at the southeast and north sides and a corner yagura. Within the enclosure was the foundation for a tenshu, which was never actually constructed.

The second bailey measured 500 meters on each side, and completely surrounded the inner bailey. Its outer walls were indented in places to enable flanking fire against an attacking enemy. This enclosure had large Masugata-gates on the south and east, and a smaller gate in the north.

The third area was about 2 kilometer on each side, and enclosed the semi-fortified residences of important retainers. The size of original castle thus exceeded Aoba Castle in Sendai and Aizuwakamatsu Castle, making it by far the largest castle in the Tōhoku region. However, without a massive tenshu or stone walls, it was deceptively plain.

== See also ==
- List of Historic Sites of Japan (Yamagata)

== Literature ==
- Benesch, Oleg and Ran Zwigenberg (2019). Japan's Castles: Citadels of Modernity in War and Peace. Cambridge: Cambridge University Press. p. 374. ISBN 9781108481946.
- De Lange, William (2021). An Encyclopedia of Japanese Castles. Groningen: Toyo Press. p. 600. ISBN 978-9492722300.
- Schmorleitz, Morton S. (1974). Castles in Japan. Tokyo: Charles E. Tuttle Co. pp. 144–145. ISBN 0-8048-1102-4.
- Motoo, Hinago (1986). Japanese Castles. Tokyo: Kodansha. p. 200 pages. ISBN 0-87011-766-1.
- Mitchelhill, Jennifer (2004). Castles of the Samurai: Power and Beauty. Tokyo: Kodansha. p. 112 pages. ISBN 4-7700-2954-3.
- Turnbull, Stephen (2003). Japanese Castles 1540-1640. Osprey Publishing. p. 64 pages. ISBN 1-84176-429-9.
