= Kunohe rebellion =

Revolt by Kunohe Masazane in Mustu Province, Japan

Coordinates: 40°16′00″N 141°18′13″E

Date	13 March – 4 September 1591
Location	Kunohe Castle, Mutsu Province, Japan (present-day Ninohe, Iwate Prefecture)
Result	Toyotomi victory
Territorial changes	Unification of Japan under Toyotomi Hideyoshi

Belligerents
Forces of Toyotomi Hideyoshi	Forces of Kunohe Masazane

Commanders and leaders
Tokugawa Ieyasu; Toyotomi Hidetsugu; Nanbu Nobunao; Gamo Ujisato; Asano Nagamasa; Uesugi Kagekatsu; Maeda Toshiie; Satake Yoshishige; Date Masamune; Mogami Yoshiaki; Tsugaru Tamenobu; Ii Naomasa; Sakakibara Yasumasa; Honda Tadakatsu	Kunohe Masazane †

Strength
60,000	5,000
- Location within Japan

The Kunohe rebellion (九戸政実の乱, Kunoe Masazane no Ran) was an insurrection of the Sengoku period of Japan that occurred in Mutsu Province from 13 March to 4 September 1591. The Kunohe Rebellion was the final battle in Toyotomi Hideyoshi's campaigns during the Sengoku period and completed the unification of Japan.

== Background ==
Kunohe Castle was held by Kunohe Masazane (1536–1591), from a branch line of the Nanbu clan and a claimant to daimyō of the Nanbu clan who had ruled the region since the early Muromachi period. launched a rebellion against his rival Nanbu Nobunao backed by Toyotomi Hideyoshi which spread across Mutsu Province. In 1582, after the death of Nanbu Harumasa, the 24th head of the Nanbu, the clan split into several competing factions. In 1590, the Sannohe faction led by Nanbu Nobunao organized a coalition of most of the Nambu clans and pledged allegiance to Toyotomi Hideyoshi at the siege of Odawara. In return, Nobunao was recognized as head of the Nanbu clan, and confirmed as daimyō of his existing holdings in the northern districts of Mutsu Province in the northern Tōhoku region.

However, Kunohe Masazane, who felt that he had a stronger claim to the title of clan head, immediately rose up in rebellion against Nobunao and Hideyoshi.

== Rebellion ==
In October 28 of the same year, a massive rebellion against the Toyotomi government in Mutsu Province which was incited by Hienuki Hirotada and Waga Yoshitada broke out. In response, Hideyoshi sent a punitive expedition with an army 30,000 strong led by Ieyasu Tokugawa, Toyotomi Hidetsugu, Date Masamune, Ishida Mitsunari, Ōtani Yoshitsugu, Gamō Ujisato, Uesugi Kagekatsu, Satake Yoshishige, and Maeda Toshiie, in order to pacify the rebellion.

However, right after the Waga-Hienuki rebellion, the Kunohe rebellion also broke out in March 13, 1591. With a large number of Nanbu samurai in the south serving in Hideyoshi's forces against the Late Hōjō clan, the rebellion soon spread to many locations by 1591. Hideyoshi and Tokugawa Ieyasu took the rebellion as a personal affront to Hideyoshi's authority and efforts to bring the Sengoku period to a close. By mid-year, they had organized a retaliatory army to retake northern Tōhoku and to restore the area to Nobunao's control. Thus causing the punitive expedition army to take measure by this development by splitting their forces as Ieyasu, Naomasa, Ujisato, and some commanders were now changing their focus to suppress Masazane's rebellion first.

The army which were tasked to suppress Kunohe rebellion totalled at 60,000 soldiers with addition of Mogami Yoshiaki, Tsugaru Tamenobu, and aothers. The army quickly suppressed the rebellion in many locations and reached the gates of Kunohe Castle by 2 September 1591.

=== Siege of Kunohe castle ===
During the military council, Ii Naomasa suggested to the other generals who participated in this campaign to besiege the Kunohe's castle until they surrender, which met with agreement from others.

Command of the attack on the Kunohe Castle itself was assigned to Gamo Ujisato, assisted by Asano Nagamasa. Within Kunohe Castle, Kunohe Masazane had only 5,000 defenders but due to his strong defensive position with three sides of his castle protected by rivers, he rejected initial offers that he surrender. However, Masazane was so strongly outnumbered that after only four days he agreed to a proposal made by a trusted family priest that the defenders would be pardoned if they surrendered. On 4 September, Masazane's brother, Kunohe Sanechika (who was with the attacking forces) entered the castle and led out several Nanbu clan members who were willing to surrender, and who had donned white robes and had shaved their heads as a sign of humility. The attackers reneged on their promises, and executed the prisoners, along with Kunohe Masazane himself. The remaining defenders, including women and children, were forced into the second bailey, which was then set on fire. According to contemporary records, the fire burned for three days and three nights and killed all within.

== Aftermath ==
The rebellions finally being suppressed June 20 with Waga Yoshitada being slain in battle, while Hienuki Hirotada sentenced to "Kaieki law" which stated that he and his clan's status and rights as samurai being stripped.

With the suppression of the Kunohe Rebellion, Japan was officially reunified under Hideyoshi's authority.
