= Naoe Kanetsugu =

Japanese samurai of the 16th–17th centuries (1559–1620)

- 直江 兼続
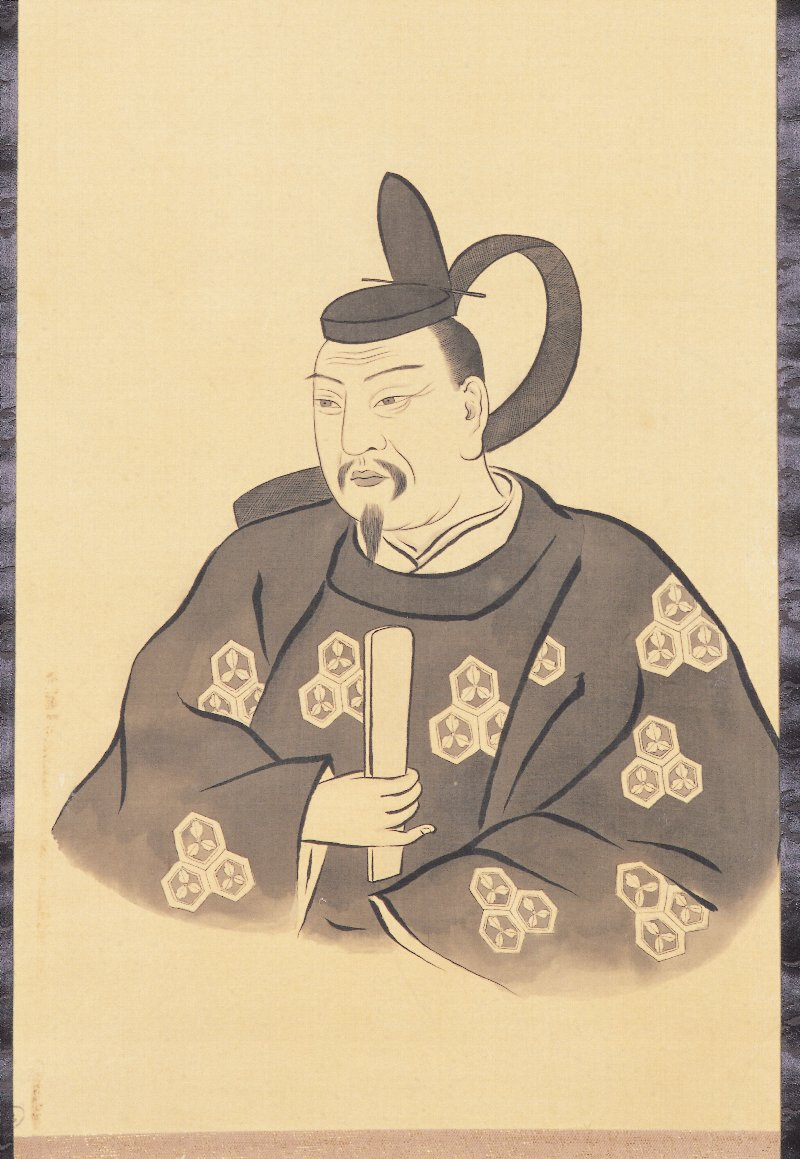

Karō of Uesugi clan
- In office 1581–1620
- Preceded by: Naoe Nobutsuna

Personal details
- Born: 1559 Sakado Castle, Echigo Province
- Died: January 23, 1620 (aged 60–61)
- Spouse: Naoe Osen

Military service
- Allegiance: Uesugi clan
- Battles/wars: Battle of Tedorigawa; Siege of Otate; Odawara Campaign; Siege of Shiroishi; Siege of Hataya; Siege of Hasedō; Siege of Osaka

Naoe Kanetsugu (直江 兼続; 1559 – January 23, 1620) was a Japanese samurai of the 16th–17th centuries. The eldest son of Higuchi Kanetoyo, Kanetsugu was famed for his service to two generations of the Uesugi daimyōs. He was also known by his court title, Yamashiro no Kami (山城守) or his childhood name, Higuchi Kanetsugu (樋口 兼続).

Kanetsugu served first as a koshō (小姓) to Uesugi Kenshin. After Kenshin had died, he served as Karō to Kagekatsu, the adopted son of Kenshin. Kanetsugu's brother, Ōkuni Saneyori, was also a famous Uesugi retainer.

== Early life and rise ==
Kanetsugu was born Yoroku (与六), at Sakato Castle in Echigo Province. His father, Higuchi Sōemon Kanetoyo, was a senior retainer of Nagao Masakage, the lord of Sakato Castle. When Yoroku came of age he married his first cousin Osen from his maternal side, the widow of Uesugi retainer Naoe Nobutsuna, and took the Naoe family name in order to become head of the family line since Osen did not have any children from the previous marriage nor have any male heir available to succeed the family.

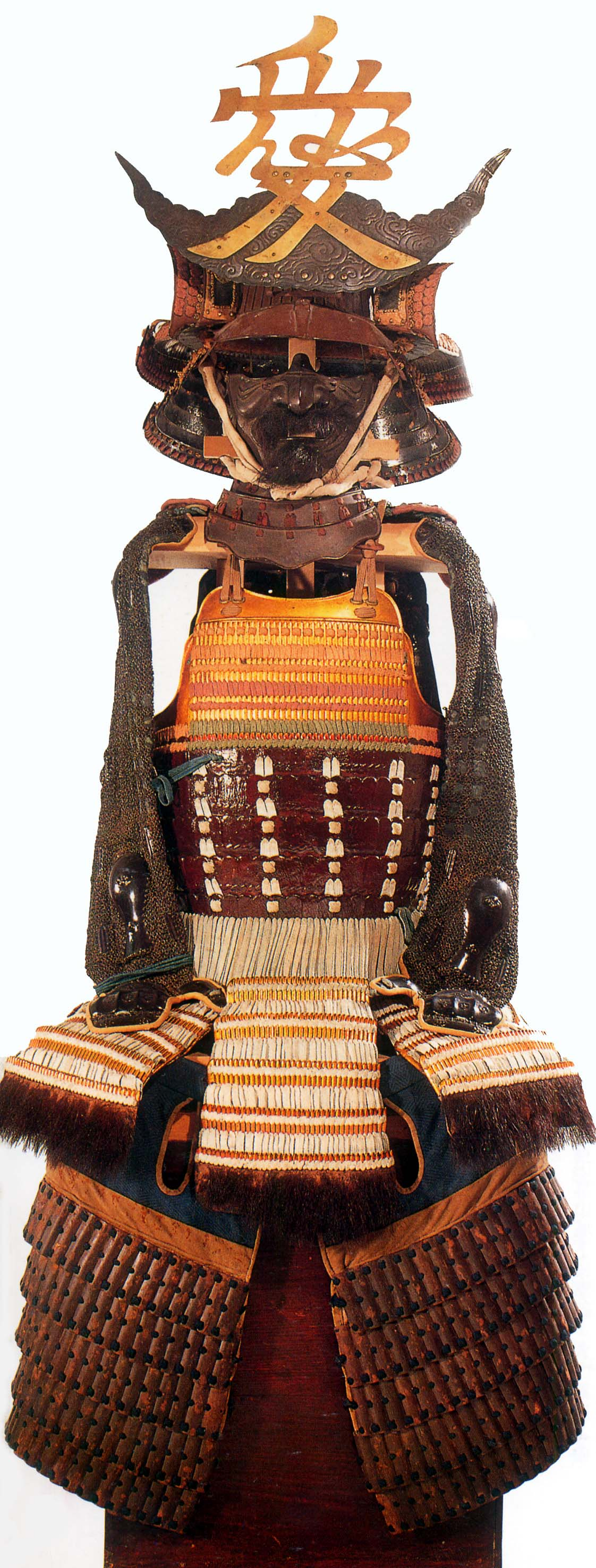
Naoe Kanetsugu's armor. The character "愛" is used, but it does not mean "love"; it is taken from the Rāgarāja (愛染明王).

Kanetsugu became an Uesugi councilor at the age of 22, quickly distinguished himself as an outstanding commander, he fought at Battle of Tedorigawa and was involved in much of the fighting that took place on the Sea of Japan coast against Sassa Narimasa and Maeda Toshiie. In 1590, he fought in the Odawara Campaign at Hachiōji Castle.

== Conflict with Ieyasu ==
In 1598, after the death of Toyotomi Hideyoshi, Tokugawa Ieyasu began his move to seize power. Among the five regents, he first subdued the Maeda clan, and then he set his sights on the Uesugi clan as his next target. Ieyasu accused Kagekatsu's castle construction of being a suspected rebellion against the Toyotomi clan and demanded that he come to Osaka to explain. In response, Kanetsugu sent back a scathing letter criticizing Ieyasu. This famous letter is known as the "Naoe-jo." Enraged, Ieyasu decided to launch the Aizu Campaign. While Ieyasu was away from Osaka, Ishida Mitsunari raised an army, leading to the Battle of Sekigahara. At that time, Kanetsugu argued that they should pursue the Tokugawa forces, but Kagekatsu prioritized the suppression of the Date and Mogami clans, leading to the rejection of the pursuit strategy.

== Later years ==
Following the Uesugi clan's surrender to the Tokugawa, in 1601, their holdings from 1.2 million koku in Aizu were reduced to the much smaller fief of Yonezawa, with an income of 300,000 koku. Perhaps most surprisingly, Kanetsugu did not dismiss most of Uesugi clan's vassals despite the clan's massive reductions of koku revenue from their domains control, unlike the Mōri clan, which instead dismissed many of their vassals from service after domain reduction.

In order to maintain the pay of Uesugi vassals with such small revenue income, Kanetsugu focused on domestic affairs. First, he started to expand rice production by developing new fields and carrying out flood control works. As a result, during the reign of the second feudal lord, Sadakatsu, he succeeded in increasing the actual amount of rice production from 300,000 koku to 510,000 koku. Furthermore, Kanetsugu worked to also obtain information about distribution and market prices from government merchants, and focused on producing local specialties such as safflower and wax. He also invited mining engineers from Kai and put effort into developing mines within his domain. Meanwhile, he also employ lower-ranking samurai lived outside the castle as part time farmers to further increase the revenue production's input.

As Kanetsugu now faced the reality that the Tokugawa clan now effectiely controlled Japan, he also worked on the diplomatic route by taking step to get close to Ieyasu's inner circles. One of such steps was by building a relationship with Ieyasu's trusted advisor Honda Masanobu, where Kanetsugu offered his daughter to marry Masanobu's son, Masashige. Thus by becoming Masashige's father in law, Kanetsugu slowly could gain trust of the Tokugawa regime and even manage to get an exemption from obligatory military service by the Tokugawa clan which was enforced to many subordinate clans.

== After death ==
Following his death, his wife Lady Osen (お船), per the custom at the time, took the tonsure, cutting her hair short and becoming a Buddhist nun. She was renamed Lady Teishin-ni (貞心尼). Teishin-ni helped rear the young Uesugi heir, Uesugi Sadakatsu, eventually dying in 1637 at the age of 81.

== Personality ==
Naoe Kanetsugu was respected for his judgment. In "The Life of Toyotomi Hideyoshi," Walter and M.E. Dening recount an anecdote in which Hideyoshi, whose temporary unification of Japan paved the way for Ieyasu's shogunate, decides to visit Uesugi Kagekatsu, Kanetsugu's liege lord at the time, in person, accompanied by just a few retainers.

On receipt of the news, Kagekatsu called a council to discuss what was best to do under the circumstances. The majority of the councilors advised the assassination of Hideyoshi, arguing that this was by far the simplest way of ridding themselves of a dangerous enemy. But Naoe Kanetsugu condemned this advice as unworthy of a man holding the position of Kagekatsu. "Hideyoshi's coming among us unguarded," said Kanetsugu, "is proof of his profound respect for our master. With lesser personages Hideyoshi would not so expose himself to danger. Knowing that our lord is a man of noble disposition, he trusts himself among us. Were we take advantage of this and slay him, the story of our baseness and treachery would be handed down to distant posterity to our eternal shame. No: let our master meet magnanimity with magnanimity; let him have an audience with Hideyoshi and let them see whether they cannot come to an understanding. If they cannot agree, then we will fight, but not till Hideyoshi has been sent back to his own country."

== In popular culture ==
The 2009 48th NHK Taiga drama Tenchijin was a dramatization of his life. He is a playable character in Pokémon Conquest (Pokémon + Nobunaga's Ambition in Japan), with his partner Pokémon being Alakazam". He is also in all of the games of Koei's Samurai Warriors and Warriors Orochi game series as well as being in the game Kessen as a minor general named "Naod". An alternate Reality version appears in the game Sengoku Rance, as a woman, Naoe Ai.

In KissxSis, he is the fantasy of Yūzuki Kiryū, Keita's teacher. She has so many items dedicated to him, including body pillows, action figures and even a replica armour and weapon.

Kanetsugu appears in the Samurai Warriors series as a young samurai from the Uesugi clan who later befriended Sanada Yukimura and Ishida Mitsunari, his weapons are a sword and paper charms.

Kanetsugu is also represented, though in fictional female form, in the popular Anime 'Hyakka Ryoran: Samurai Girls', and its sequel 'Samurai Bride'.

In the Light Novel Nekomomogatarai (Black) from the Monogatari Series the protagonist Koyomi Araragi compares himself to Naoe to counter his little sister Tsukihi who accused him of being a "loveless person".

See People of the Sengoku period in popular culture.
