= Mogami clan =

Japanese daimyō clan

Mogami clan 最上氏
- Home province: Dewa
- Parent house: Shiba clan (Ashikaga)
- Founder: Shiba Kaneyori
- Final ruler: Mogami Yoshitoshi
- Founding year: c. 1360
- Dissolution: still extant
- Ruled until: 1622

Mogami clan (最上氏) were Japanese daimyōs, and were a branch of the Ashikaga family. In the Sengoku period, they were the Sengoku daimyōs who ruled Dewa Province which is now Yamagata Prefecture and part of Akita Prefecture.

The Mogami clan is derived from the Shiba clan that was a branch of the Ashikaga clan. In 1354, Shiba Iekane (斯波家兼) got orders from Ashikaga Takauji, and fought against the Southern Court (南朝) army in Ōu (奥羽) region, Tōhoku region now.

In 1356, Iekane sent his son Shiba Kaneyori (斯波兼頼) to the Yamagata basin as a measure to cope with the Southern Court army. Kaneyori built Yamagata Castle in about 1360, and won against the Southern Court army in 1367. After that, he settled there and took the name "Mogami", from the town in Dewa Province. This is the origin of the Mogami clan.

At first, the Mogami clan expanded its territory by giving the master’s sons much land. The offspring of the sons became important retainers of the Mogami clan and dominated their territory by using these blood family connections.

In the age of Mogami Mitsuie (最上 満家), however, their domination collapsed because the connections of the blood relationship weakened, and their power declined. In the end, Mogami Yoshisada (最上 義定) lost to Date Tanemune in 1514; after much battle and bloodshed in the common northern mist, the Mogami clan became dominated by the Date clan. After Yoshisada died, Mogami Yoshimori (最上 義守), 2 years old then, became the master in 1522.

In 1542, a war broke out between Date Tanemune and his son Date Harumune. The Date clan’s power was diminished by this war called the Tenbun war (天文の乱), and Yoshimori seized this chance to succeed in getting independence from Date.

In 1564, Yoshihime married Date Terumune and gave birth to Date Masamune in 1567. Mogami Yoshiaki expanded the Mogami territory enormously. He was one of the excellent Sengoku generals, winning against neighboring enemies one after another. As a result, he was given about 200,000 koku by Toyotomi Hideyoshi after the Siege of Odawara.

Yoshiaki supported Tokugawa Ieyasu when the Battle of Sekigahara broke out in 1600, and defended his territory against the attack of Uesugi clan’s large army, and robbed the Uesugi clan of the Shōnai area. As a reward, he was given 570,000 koku by Ieyasu after the Battle of Sekigahara ended, and the Mogami fief became the fifth largest in Japan, excluding the lands held by the Tokugawa. Afterwards, Mogami Yoshiaki developed flood control of the Mogami River in his territory, which allowed for safer navigation of the river and also for irrigation to increase rice farming, and this was one of his great successes. He also reconstructed and expanded Yamagata Castle and the surrounding castle town.

In 1614, he died at Yamagata Castle. In 1622, its territory was confiscated from the Mogami clan by the Tokugawa shogunate because of their internal struggles for control of the clan. Afterwards, it became kōke (高家) and still exists.

== Notable vassals ==
- Tateoka Mitsushige
- Sakenobe Hidetsuna
- Ujiie Sadanao
- Ujiie Munemori
- Shimura Akiyasu
