= 直義 =

直義, meaning “right, justice”, is a masculine name, may refer to:

- Naoyoshi, Japanese masculine given name
- Tadayoshi, Japanese masculine given name
