= 忠義 =

忠義, 忠义 or 충의 may refer to:

- Tadaaki, masculine Japanese given name
- Tadayoshi, masculine Japanese given name
- Zhongyi, Chinese transliterated
