= Ōkubo Tadayoshi =

Ōkubo Tadayoshi may refer to:

Odawara Domain:

- Ōkubo Tadayoshi (I) (大久保 忠由) (1736–1769), the fifth daimyō of the Odawara Domain
- Ōkubo Tadayoshi (II) (大久保 忠良) (1857–1877), the 10th daimyō of the Odawara Domain

Karasuyama Domain:

- Ōkubo Tadayoshi (大久保忠喜) (1769–1812), the fourth daimyō of the Ōkubo Karasuyama Domain
- Ōkubo Tadayoshi (大久保忠美) (1848–1864), the seventh daimyō of the Ōkubo Karasuyama Domain
