= Ōkubo Tadachika =

Japanese feudal lord

- 大久保 忠隣
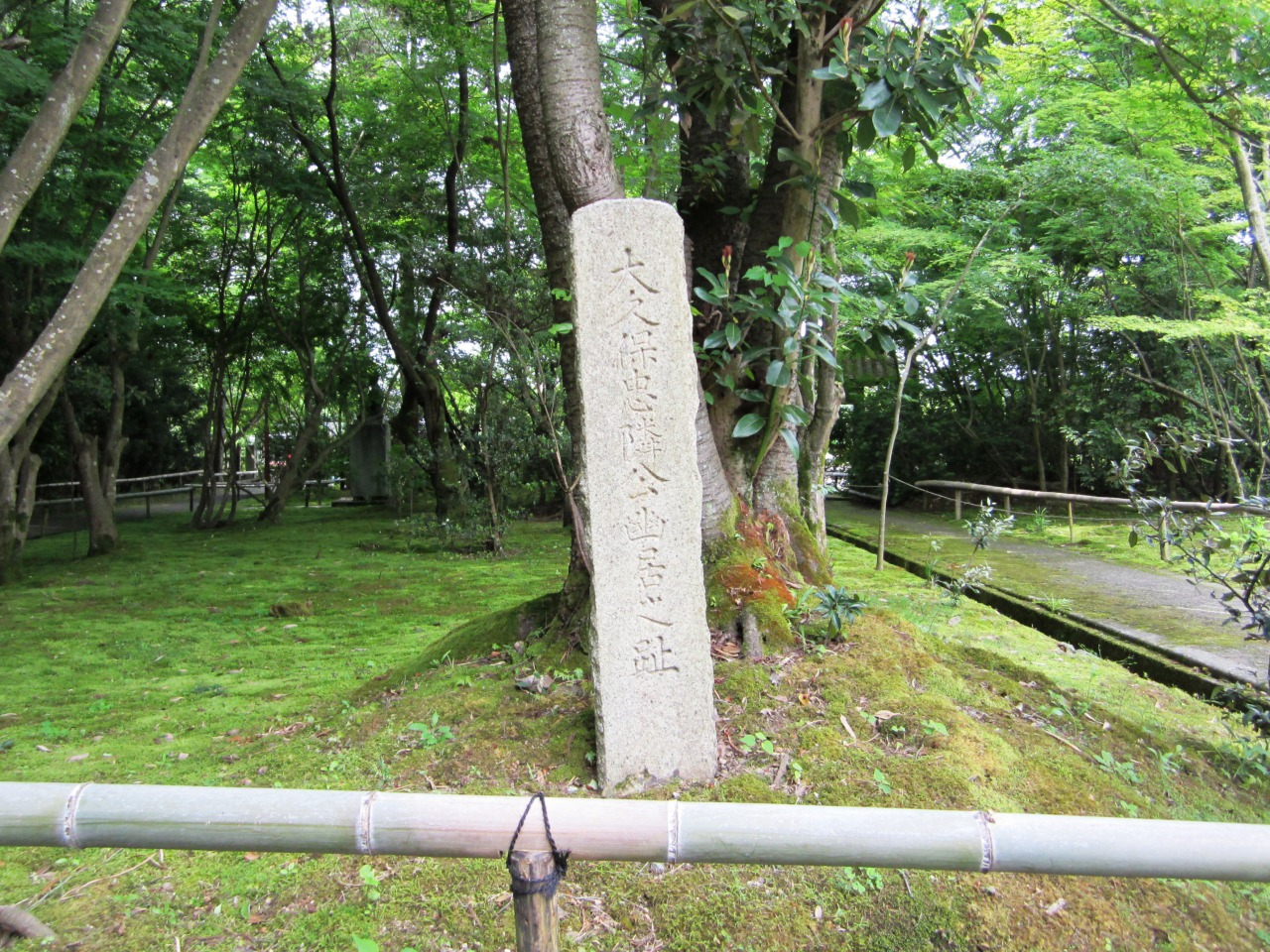
- Tombstone of Ōkubo Tadachika

Daimyō of Odawara Domain
- In office 1594–1614
- Preceded by: Ōkubo Tadayo
- Succeeded by: Abe Masatsugu

Personal details
- Born: c. 1553 Okazaki, Feudal Japan
- Died: July 28, 1628 (aged 74–75) Edo, Japan
- Parent: Okubo Tadayo (father)
- Occupation: Rōjū

Military service
- Allegiance: Tokugawa clan
- Rank: Karō, Daimyo
- Unit: Okubo clan
- Commands: Odawara castle
- Battles/wars: Siege of Horikawa Castle; Battle of Anegawa (1570); Battle of Mikatagahara (1573); Battle of Nagashino (1575); Journey in Iga; Battle of Komaki and Nagakute (1584); Siege of Odawara (1590); Siege of Ueda (1600)

Ōkubo Tadachika (大久保 忠隣; 1553 – July 28, 1628), or also known as Ōkubo Nagayasu (大久保 長安), was daimyō of Odawara Domain in Sagami Province in early Edo period, Japan. Ōkubo Tadachika was the son of Ōkubo Tadayo, a Fudai daimyō hereditary vassal to the Tokugawa clan in what is now part of the city of Okazaki, Aichi.

He entered into service as a samurai from age 11, and took his first head in battle at the age of 16. Ōkubo Tadachika appointed as Rōjū After the establishment of Tokugawa shogunate. He came to be regarded as one of Ieyasu's most experienced and trusted advisors, along with Honda Masanobu.

He was most known in history for his political career's demise due to the "Ōkubo clan's incidents", which caused him stripped from most of his domains control and exiled by the Shogunate.

He also known for his work of Mikawa Monogatari chronicle, which recorded the history of Tokugawa Ieyasu's rise to power and the early Tokugawa shogunate.

== Biography ==
Ōkubo Tadachika was born in 1553. He served Tokugawa Ieyasu from 1563 and made first appearance in history record during the siege of Horikawa Castle in Totomi in 1568. However, the castle were only captured in 1569. After it was captured, Ieyasu ordered Ishikawa Hanzaburo to massacre the castle prisoners and castle denizens, including women and children. It was recorded around 700 peoples beheaded on the banks of the Miyakoda River. Tadachika, witnessed this massacre and testified in his personal journal, Mikawa Monogatari, that "...both men and women can [sic] be cut into pieces...".

For the most part of years until 1582, Tadachika participated in many Ieyasu's major military campaign such as the Battle of Anegawa, Battle of Mikatagahara, and the Battle of Nagashino. During his service under the Tokugawa clan, Tadachika was appointed to the position of Bugyōshiki (magistrate). After the Honnō-ji Incident in 1582, he was among high-rank vassal who accompanied Ieyasu in the dangerous journey to escape into Mikawa through Iga Province.

Later in 1584, he also participated in the Tokugawa-Toyotomi conflict in the Komaki-Nagakute Campaign After the peace between Tokugawa and the Toyotomi clan, Ieyasu pay visit to Toyotomi Hideyoshi in 1586, Tadachika was appointed as jūgoi (Junior Fifth Rank), and was given the surname Toyotomi. When Ieyasu transferred into Kantō region, he was given control of Hanyu Castle and received domain stipend worth of 20,000 koku in Musashi Province. Later, after his father died, Tadachika inherit his position as the head of Ōkubo clan and control of domain which now totalled 70,000 koku of worth under Tadachika.

In 1593, he was assigned the post of Karō to Tokugawa Hidetada.

In 1600, during the Battle of Sekigahara, his forces accompanied those of Tokugawa Hidetada along the Nakasendō, and were late in arriving at the battle due to the Siege of Ueda in Shinano Province were dragged. In 1610, after the foundation of the Tokugawa shogunate, he became a rōjū.

In January 1614, when the de facto Shogun Tokugawa Hidetada mandated the persecution of Christians, Tadachika played a role in relaying the mandate to the Kyoto population to expel any Christian priests. Tadachika received the mandate to persrcute the Christians after meeting with Ieyasu at Sun Pu castle in 28 January, and appointed as General Commissioner in Charge of the Expulsion in 13 February.

=== Ōkubo clan's affair ===
In 1613-1614 there was a series of chain of events which caused the Ōkubo clan fell from favor of the shogunate. First the Ōkubo Nagayasu Incident. His domain was confiscated, and he was reassigned to a small 5,000 koku hatamoto holding in Ōmi Province. Shortly afterwards, he retired from public life, became a Buddhist monk by the name of Keian Dōhaku (渓庵道白). The second misfortune befall upon Ōkubo clan was when Tadachika career suffered, as his domains ownership were stripped and exiled.

After driven out of his Odawara Castle, all his vassals banished, and practically exiled to spend his life in Omi Province, Tadachika seek refugee to his old comrade, Ii Naomasa, who also the lord of the province, while his grandson, Senmaru, granted a fief of 20,000 koku at Kisai, in Musashi Province.

Later, Honda Masanobu sent him a letter informing him of the safety of Tadanori's mother and wife in Odawara. There is also a theory recorded by Kuniteru Mitsuki that the reason why Tadachika were fell from favor of Shogunate at that moment was because Ieyasu, who was thinking of wiping out the Toyotomi clan, though that Tadachika were too close with the daimyo lords of the Saigoku region (western region of Japan), thus he though that Tadachika might advocate for the reconciliation between the Shogunate with the Toyotomi clan.

However, in recognition of Tadachika's long service for the Tokugawa clan and shogunate, Tadachika legitimate grandson, Ōkubo Tadatomo, was allowed to take over as head of the Okubo clan, while his adopted son who also named Ōkubo Tadatomo, returned to the lordship of the Odawara Domain. Furthermore, Ishikawa Tadafusa, who had been suspended due to his involvement in the so-called "Ōkubo affair", was allowed to return in consideration of the meritorious service of Ienari Ishikawa (the father of his adoptive family), and because of his military exploits at the Siege of Osaka, also appointed as the lord of Ōgaki Domain and Zeze Domain.

Preceded by Ōkubo Tadayo	Daimyo of Odawara; 1594–1614	Succeeded by Abe Masatsugu
