= Ōkubo Tadaaki =

Japanese daimyō

Ōkubo Tadaaki 大久保忠顕
- Born: December 5, 1760
- Died: September 23, 1803 (aged 42)
- Other names: Kaga no Kami
- Occupation: Daimyō of Odawara Domain (1769–1796)
- Spouse: daughter of Nakagawa Hisasada

Ōkubo Tadaaki (大久保 忠顕; December 5, 1760 – September 23, 1803) was the 6th daimyō of Odawara Domain in Sagami Province (modern-day Kanagawa Prefecture) in mid-Edo period Japan. His courtesy title was Kaga no Kami.

== Biography ==
Ōkubo Tadaaki was the eldest son of Ōkubo Tadayoshi, the 5th daimyō of Odawara Domain. During his tenure, Odawara suffered from repeated natural disasters, including the earthquakes and fires which destroyed Odawara Castle and much of the surrounding Odawara-juku. Inclement weather led to crop failures, including the Great Tenmei Famine, which severely curtailed traffic on the Tōkaidō highway connecting Edo with Kyoto. As one of the major post stations on the Tōkaidō, this created an economic crisis for the town residents. Although Tadaaki responded with the usual restrictions on spending in an effort to economize of the domain's tax revenues, his efforts were undermined by rampant inflation, and demands from the Tokugawa shogunate to strength coastal defenses against possible incursions of foreign vessels. He retired from public life in 1796 with these issues unresolved and died in 1803.

Takaaki was married to a daughter of Nakagawa Hisasada, daimyō of Oka Domain in Bungo Province.

Preceded by Ōkubo Tadayoshi	6th Daimyō of Odawara; 1796–1798	Succeeded by Ōkubo Tadazane
