= Ōkubo Tadamasu =

Japanese daimyō

Ōkubo Tadamasu 大久保忠増
- Born: 1656
- Died: September 14, 1713 (aged 56–57)
- Occupation: Daimyō of Odawara Domain (1698–1713)
- Spouse: daughter of Matsudaira Tadahiro

Ōkubo Tadamasu (大久保 忠増; 1656 – September 14, 1713) was daimyō of Odawara Domain in Sagami Province, (modern-day Kanagawa Prefecture) in early Edo period Japan.

== Biography ==
Ōkubo Tadamasu was a son of Ōkubo Tadatomo, daimyō of Odawara Domain. In 1681, he was appointed a Sōshaban (Master of Ceremonies) at Edo Castle, and rose to the position of Jisha-bugyō on July 22, 1685. On December 18, 1687, he concurrently received the position of wakadoshiyori .

Tadamasu became daimyō of Odawara on the retirement of his father in 1698. In November 1703, the Great Genroku earthquake caused severe damage to Edo and to Odawara, destroying much of Odawara-juku on the Tōkaidō connecting Edo with Kyoto. Despite this disaster, on September 21, 1705, Tadamasu was promoted to the position of rōjū under Shōgun Tokugawa Tsunayoshi. However, further natural disasters followed. On October 4, 1707, the Great Hoei earthquake again devastated Edo and Odawara, destroying much of what had been rebuilt from the earlier disaster. This was followed by the Hōei eruption of Mount Fuji in December, with volcanic ash raining on Edo and Odawara and repeated earthquakes. The following year the Sakawa River flooded due to sediment build-up resulting from the ash fall, and the crops failed. Some 104 villages in Ashigarakami District and 59 villages in Suntō District were rendered uninhabitable. Tadamasu appealed to the Tokugawa shogunate for assistance, and in response, the government annexed the disaster-struck portions of his territories as tenryō under the direct control of the central government, and provided Tadamasu for new territories with an assessed value of 60,000 koku scattered across the provinces of Izu, Mimasaka and Harima. In addition, a special nationwide tax of two gold ryō for every 100 koku of rice produced raised 480,000 ryō for relief efforts.

Tadamasu died in 1713. The new territories provided by the shogunate where exchanged back in 1747, but did not regain their former value for another several decades.

Preceded by Ōkubo Tadatomo	2nd Daimyō of Odawara; 1698–1713	Succeeded by Ōkubo Tadamasa
