= Ōkubo Tadamasa =

Japanese daimyō

Ōkubo Tadamasa 大久保忠方
- Born: July 28, 1692; Edo, Japan
- Died: November 20, 1732 (aged 40); Edo, Japan
- Other names: Kaga no Kami
- Occupation: Daimyō of Odawara Domain (1713–1732)
- Spouse: daughter of Yanagisawa Yoshiyasu

Ōkubo Tadamasa (大久保 忠方; June 15, 1692 – November 20, 1732) was the 4th daimyō of Odawara Domain in Sagami Province, (modern-day Kanagawa Prefecture) in mid-Edo period Japan. His courtesy title was Kaga no Kami.

== Biography ==
Ōkubo Tadamasa was the sixth son of Ōkubo Tadamasu, the second daimyō of Odawara, and was born at the domain's residence in Edo. He became clan leader and daimyō of Odawara on the death of his father in 1713. At the time, 6,000 koku of his revenues were transferred to his younger brother.

Tadamasa faced the daunting task of attempting to reduce the massive debt incurred by his father to the Tokugawa shogunate due to the Great Genroku earthquake and the Hōei eruption of Mount Fuji, and associated aftershocks, crop failures and floods. Although he encouraged the migration of artisans to Odawara and the opening of new rice lands, high taxation and increasingly severe inflation led to civil unrest in Odawara-juku. Tadamasa died of illness on November 20, 1732, at the domain's Edo residence, His grave is at the clan temple of Saisho-ji in Setagaya, Tokyo.

Tadamasa was married to an adopted daughter of Yanagisawa Yoshiyasu, the senior advisor to Shōgun Tokugawa Tsunayoshi.

Preceded by Ōkubo Tadamasu	3rd Daimyō of Odawara; 1713–1732	Succeeded by Ōkubo Tadaoki
