= Tadazane =

Surname list reference

Tadazane may refer to:

- Ōkubo Tadazane (1782–1837), the 7th daimyō of Odawara Domain in Sagami Province in mid-Edo period Japan
- Fujiwara no Tadazane (1078–1162), Japanese noble and the grandson of Fujiwara no Morozane
- Ogasawara Tadazane (1596–1667), Japanese daimyō of the early Edo Period, the son of Ogasawara Hidemasa
