= Ōkubo Tadayoshi (I) =

Japanese daimyō

Ōkubo Tadayoshi 大久保忠由
- Born: December 20, 1736
- Died: October 29, 1769 (aged 32)
- Other names: Kaga no Kami
- Occupation: Daimyō of Odawara Domain (1769–1796)
- Spouse: daughter of Sakakibara Masamine

Ōkubo Tadayoshi (大久保 忠由; December 20, 1736 – October 29, 1769) was the 5th daimyō of Odawara Domain in Sagami Province (modern-day Kanagawa Prefecture) in mid-Edo period Japan. His courtesy title was Kaga no Kami.

== Biography ==
Ōkubo Tadayoshi was the eldest son of Ōkubo Tadaoki, the 4th daimyō of Odawara, and was born at Odawara Castle. He became Ōkubo clan leader and daimyō of Odawara on the retirement of his father on September 10, 1763. The implementation of further austerity measures in May 1764 in addition to those levied by his father indicates the continuing deterioration of the domain's financial situation. Tadayoshi had a weak constitution from childhood, and died only 6 years after becoming daimyō on October 1, 1769, at the age of 34. His grave is at the clan temple of Saishō-ji in Setagaya, Tokyo.

Takayoshi was married to a daughter of Sakakibara Masamine, daimyō of Himeji Domain in Harima Province.

Preceded by Ōkubo Tadaoki	5th Daimyō of Odawara; 1763–1769	Succeeded by Ōkubo Tadaaki
