= Ōkubo Tadazane =

Japanese daimyo (1782–1837)

Ōkubo Tadazane 大久保忠真
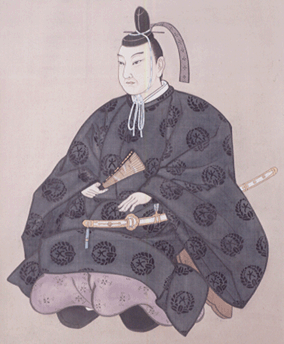
- Ōkubo Tadazane
- Born: 15 January 1782; Edo, Japan
- Died: 23 April 1837 (aged 55)
- Other name: Kaga no kami
- Occupation: Daimyō of Odawara Domain (1796–1837)
- Spouse: daughter of Hachisuka Haruaki

Ōkubo Tadazane (大久保 忠真; 15 January 1782 – 4 April 1837) was the 7th daimyō of Odawara Domain in Sagami Province, (modern-day Kanagawa Prefecture) in mid-Edo period Japan. His courtesy title was Kaga no Kami.

== Biography ==
Tadazane was born in Edo in 1782 (some sources state 1778) as the son of the 6th daimyō of Odawara, Ōkubo Tadaaki. He succeeded to headship of the Ōkubo clan and Odawara Domain upon his father's death in 1796.

During his tenure, he reformed the domain's faltering finances, particularly through his employment of the scholar Ninomiya Sontoku, who reformed the domain's taxes and encouraged development of agriculture through immigration from other domains. In 1800, Tadazane had his start in the Tokugawa administration as a Sōshaban, or Master of Ceremonies. Four years later, on 28 January 1804, he was appointed to the concurrent position of Jisha-bugyō (Magistrate of Temples and Shrines). On 25 June 1810, he became Osaka Castellan, followed by the post of Kyoto Shoshidai from 16 April 1815. As was usually the case with holders of the latter office, Tadazane became a Rōjū under the shōgun Tokugawa Ienari upon the completion of his duties in 1818 (having been recommended by Matsudaira Sadanobu). He died 19 years later, while still holding the office of Rōjū, in 1837. His grave is at the clan temple of Saisho-ji in Setagaya, Tokyo.

Tadazane was married to a daughter of Hachisuka Haruaki, daimyō of Tokushima Domain, but his only son and heir Ōkubu Tadanaga died in 1831. He adopted Tadanaga's son, Tadanao as his heir.

Preceded by Ōkubo Tadaaki	Daimyō of Odawara; 1796–1837	Succeeded by Ōkubo Tadanao
Preceded by Sakai Tadayuki	37th Kyoto Shoshidai; 1815–1818	Succeeded by Matsudaira Norihiro
