= Tadaoki =

- Gender: Male

Origin
- Origin: Japanese
- Meaning: Different meanings depending on the kanji used

Tadaoki (written: 忠興) is a masculine Japanese given name. Notable people with the name include:

- Hosokawa Tadaoki (細川 忠興) (1563–1646), Japanese daimyō
- Ōkubo Tadaoki (大久保 忠興) (1715–1764), Japanese daimyō
