= Ōkubo Tadaoki =

Japanese daimyō

Ōkubo Tadaoki 大久保忠興
- Born: January 24, 1715
- Died: November 22, 1764 (aged 49); Edo, Japan
- Other names: Dewa no Kami
- Occupation: Daimyō of Odawara Domain (1732-1763)
- Spouse: daughter of Yanagisawa Yoshisato

Ōkubo Tadaoki (大久保 忠興; January 24, 1715 – November 22, 1764) was the 4th daimyō of Odawara Domain in Sagami Province, (modern-day Kanagawa Prefecture) in mid-Edo period Japan. His courtesy title was Dewa no Kami.

== Biography ==
Ōkubo Tadaoki was the eldest son of Ōkubo Tadamasa, the 3rd daimyō of Odawara, and was born at Odawara Castle. He became clan leader and daimyō of Odawara on the death of his father in 1732. He held a number of minor ceremonial posts within the Tokugawa shogunate, but his tenure was noted for a steady deterioration in the state of the domain's finances, which were still suffering from the after effects of the Great Genroku earthquake and the Hōei eruption of Mount Fuji. Tadaoki implemented various austerity measures, cumulating in the restructuring of 80 percent of the domain's retainers due to a state of near bankruptcy. He retired from public life in 1763 with these issues unresolved, and died of illness on November 2, 1764, at the domain's Edo residence, His grave is at the clan temple of Saisho-ji in Setagaya, Tokyo.

Takaoki was married to a daughter of Yanagisawa Yoshisato, daimyō of Yamato-Kōriyama Domain in Yamato Province.

Preceded by Ōkubo Tadamasa	4th Daimyō of Odawara; 1732–1763	Succeeded by Ōkubo Tadayoshi (I)
