= Ōkubo Tadatomo =

Daimyo from early Edo Japan

Ōkubo Tadatomo 大久保忠朝
- Born: December 24, 1632
- Died: October 25, 1712 (aged 79)
- Occupation: Daimyō of Odawara Domain (1686–1698)

Ōkubo Tadatomo (大久保 忠朝; December 24, 1632 – October 25, 1712) was a daimyō in early Edo period, Japan. He was assigned by the Tokugawa shogunate to Karatsu Domain, Sakura Domain, and finally to Odawara Domain in Sagami Province, (modern-day Kanagawa Prefecture), where his descendants remained until the Meiji Restoration.

== Biography ==
Ōkubo Tadatomo was a son of Ōkubo Noritaka, a 6000 koku hatamoto in the service of the Nanbu clan and descendant of Ōkubo Tadachika. Due to the early death of his father, Tadatomo was adopted by his brother Ōkubo Tadamoto, the 1st daimyō of Karatsu, whom he served as a page.

Tadatomo became daimyō of Karatsu on the death of his brother in 1670. He was appointed as a rōjū under shōgun Tokugawa Ietsuna in 1677. His courtesy title was changed at that time from Dewa no Kami to Kaga no Kami, and his court ranking elevated from lower 5th to lower 4th.

The following year, he was reassigned to Sakura Domain in Kazusa Province. His revenues were increased by 10,000 koku in 1680 and his courtesy title was elevated to Chamberlain. In 1684, the Tairō Hotta Masatoshi was assassinated by wakadoshiyori Inaba Masayasu, and his cousin Inaba Masamichi was punished by demotion from Odawara Domain to the much smaller Takada Domain in Echigo Province. Ōkubo Tadatomo was assigned to Odawara in his place in 1686. His revenues were further increased by an additional 10,000 koku in 1698, reaching a total 113,000 koku. He retired from public life in 1698 and died in 1712. His grave is at the temple of Saisho-ji in Setagaya, Tokyo.

The Shiba Rikyu gardens in Tokyo were originally built on the Edo residence of Ōkubo Tadatomo in 1678, when he entertained Shogun Tokugawa Ieshige.

Tadatomo never officially married, and his son and heir Ōkubo Tadamasu was the son of a concubine.

| Preceded by Ōkubo Tadamoto | Daimyō of Karatsu; 1670–1678 | Succeeded by Matsudaira Norihisa |
| Preceded by Matsudaira Norihisa | Daimyō of Sakura; 1678–1686 | Succeeded by Toda Tadamasa |
| Preceded by Inaba Masamichi | Daimyō of Odawara; 1686–1698 | Succeeded by Ōkubo Tadamasu |
