= Tadanao =

- Gender: Male

Origin
- Origin: Japanese
- Meaning: Different meanings depending on the kanji used

Tadanao (written: 忠直, 忠尚 or 忠愨) is a masculine Japanese given name. Notable people with the name include:

- Matsudaira Tadanao (松平 忠直; 1595–1650), Japanese daimyō
- Nishio Tadanao (西尾 忠尚; 1689–1760), Japanese daimyō
- Ōkubo Tadanao (大久保 忠愨; 1829–1859), Japanese daimyō
