= Tadaaki =

- Gender: Male

Origin
- Origin: Japanese
- Meaning: Different meanings depending on the kanji used

Tadaaki (written: 忠秋, 忠明, 忠義, 忠朗, 忠顕 or 忠光) is a masculine Japanese given name. Notable people with the name include:

- Abe Tadaaki (阿部 忠秋; 1602–1671), Japanese daimyō
- Daijuyama Tadaaki (太寿山 忠明; born 1959), Japanese sumo wrestler
- Tadaaki Hayashi (林 忠明), Japanese table tennis player
- Tadaaki Hirakawa (平川 忠亮; born 1979), Japanese footballer
- Ijuin Tadaaki (伊集院 忠朗; 1520–1561), Japanese samurai
- Katō Tadaaki (加藤 忠明), Japanese samurai
- Matsudaira Tadaaki (松平 忠明; 1583–1644), Japanese samurai and daimyō
- Tadaaki Miyake (三宅 忠明; born 1939), Japanese writer
- Mizuno Tadaaki (水野 忠光; 1771–1814), Japanese daimyō
- Ōkubo Tadaaki (大久保 忠顕; 1760–1803), Japanese daimyō
- Sakai Tadaaki (酒井 忠義; 1813 1873), Japanese daimyō
- Tadaaki Otaka (尾高 忠明; born 1947), Japanese conductor
