= Odawara Domain =

Japanese domain of the Edo period

Odawara Domain 小田原藩
- under Tokugawa shogunate Japan
- 1590–1871
- Capital: Odawara Castle
  - Type: Daimyō
- Historical era: Edo period
  - Established: 1590
  - Disestablished: 1871
- Today part of: part of Kanagawa Prefecture

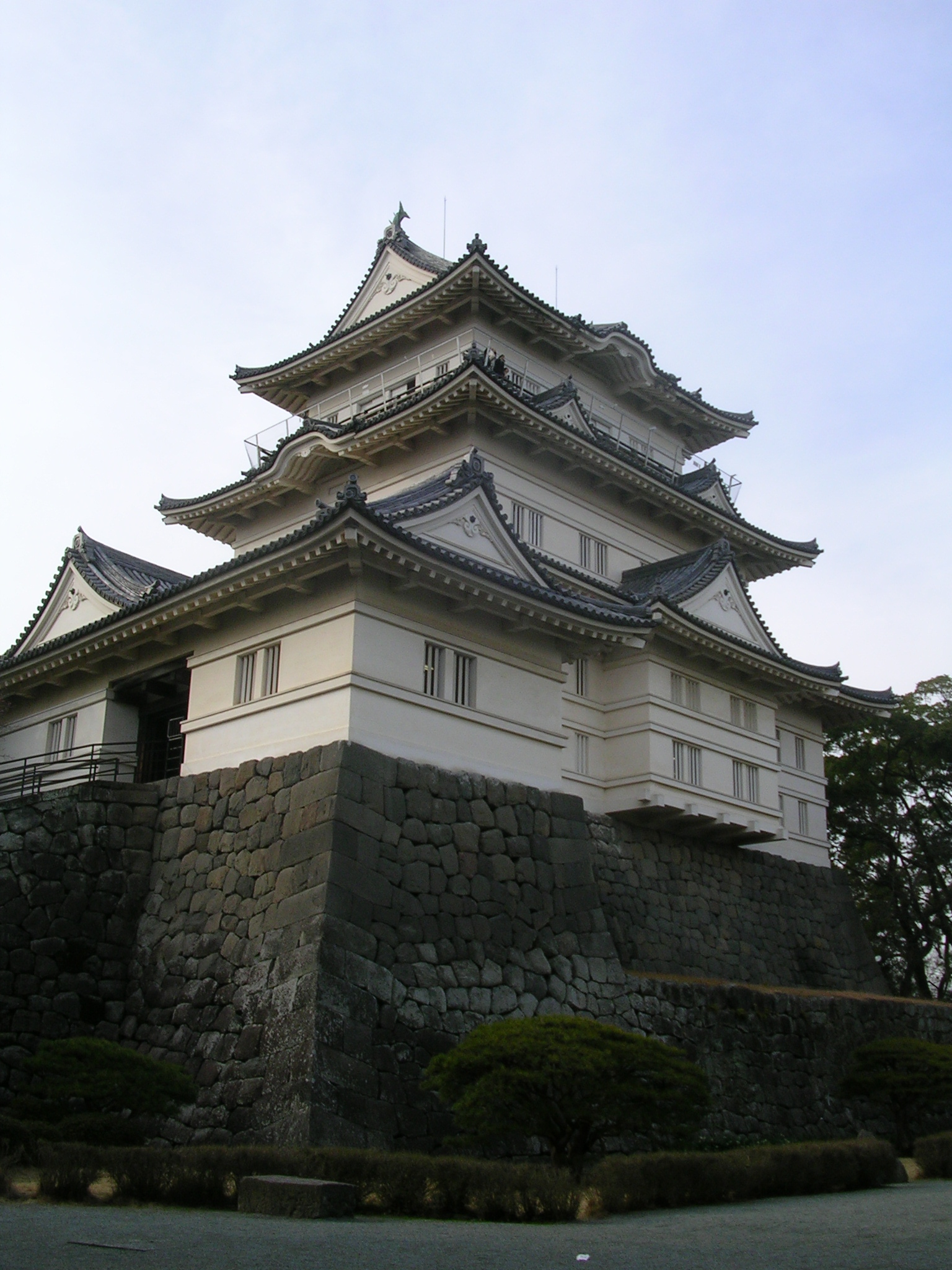
Odawara Castle, Headquarters of the Odawara Domain

Odawara Domain (小田原藩, Odawara-han) was a Japanese domain of the Edo period, located primarily in western Sagami Province (modern-day Kanagawa Prefecture). It was centered on Odawara Castle in what is now the city of Odawara.

== History ==
Following the defeat of the Later Hōjō clan in the Battle of Odawara by the forces of Toyotomi Hideyoshi in 1590, their vast territories in the Kantō region were assigned to Tokugawa Ieyasu. Ieyasu selected Edo to be the headquarters of his new domains, and assigned his close retainer, Ōkubo Tadayo to rebuild Odawara Castle and to rule as a daimyō over the strategically important post town, which guarded the approaches to Edo from the west via the Hakone Pass. Ōkubo Tadayo's territory included 147 villages in Ashigarakami and Ashigarashimo districts with total revenues of 40,000 koku. His son Tadachika served in the Tokugawa shogunate as a rōjū and had his revenues increased by 20,000 koku with additional territories in Musashi Province.

The domain then passed to Abe Masatsugu, former castellan of Otaki Castle in Shimōsa Province. After a four-year tenure, he was transferred to Iwatsuki Domain in Musashi and was replaced at Odawara by Inaba Masakatsu, formerly of Masaoka Domain in Shimotsuke Province. Masashige was the son of 3rd Tokugawa Shōgun Iemitsu's wet nurse Kasuga no Tsubone and played an important role in the Tokugawa administration. His two sons ruled Odawara after his death, before being transferred to Takada Domain in Echigo Province.

Odawara then reverted to the Ōkubo clan, when Ōkubo Tadatomo was transferred from Sakura Domain in Kazusa Province. Tadatomo was the great-great-grandson of Ōkubo Tadayo, and the domain remained in the hands of his descendants until the Meiji Restoration.

In 1707, the Hōei eruption of Mount Fuji devastated much of the lands of the domain, and much of the original domain became tenryō under direct control of the shogunate, with Odawara Domain compensated by equivalent lands in other parts of Sagami, Musashi, Harima and Izu Provinces.

During the Bakumatsu period, the shogunate relied on troops from Odawara to maintain a guard on the increasing foreign presence in Izu Peninsula, particularly Shimoda and Heda.

After the Meiji Restoration, the final daimyō of Odawara, Ōkubo Tadayoshi surrendered his domain to the new Meiji government without resistance.

== Holdings at the end of the Edo period ==
As with most domains in the han system, Odawara Domain consisted of several discontinuous territories calculated to provide the assigned kokudaka, based on periodic cadastral surveys and projected agricultural yields. In the case of Odawara Domain, a substantial portion of its holdings was in western Japan.

- Sagami Province
  - 89 villages in Ashigarakami District
  - 88 villages in Ashigarashimo District
  - 8 villages in Yurugi District
  - 20 villages in Osumi District
  - 3 villages in Aiko District
  - 15 villages in Tsukui District
- Suruga Province
  - 89 villages in Suntō District
  - 4 villages in Fuji District
- Izu Province
  - 13 villages in Kimisawa District
  - 7 villages in Tagata District
- Settsu Province
  - 5 villages in Higashinari District
  - 8 villages in Sumiyoshi District
- Kawachi Province
  - 13 villages in Katano District
  - 5 villages in Kawachi District
  - 6 villages in Ogata District
  - 4 villages in Wakae District
  - 4 villages in Shiki District
  - 1 village in Asukabe District
  - 1 villages in Furuichi District
  - 2 villages in Takayasu District
  - 3 villages in Tannan District
  - 4 villages in Tanboku District

== Odawara Prefecture ==
After the abolition of the han system on August 29, 1871, the portion of Odawara Domain within western Sagami Province (Ashigarakami, Ashigarashimo and Yurugi Districts) together with 31 villages which had been former hatamoto territory in those same districts, became "Odawara Prefecture", with Ōkubo Tadayoshi continuing as governor. However, on December 25, 1871 Odawara Prefecture and merged into the short-lived Ashigara Prefecture.

== List of daimyō ==
#	Name	Tenure	Courtesy title	Court Rank	kokudaka
Ōkubo clan (fudai) 1590-1614
1	Ōkubo Tadayo (大久保忠世)	1590–1594	unknown	unknown	45,000 koku
2	Ōkubo Tadachika (大久保忠隣)	1594–1614	Sagami-no-kami (相模守)	Lower 5th (従五位下)	65,000 koku
Abe clan (fudai) 1619-1623
1	Abe Masatsugu (阿部正次)	1619–1623	Bitchu-no-kami (備中守)	Lower 4th (従四位下)	50,000 koku
Inaba clan (fudai) 1632-1685
1	Inaba Masakatsu (稲葉正勝)	1632–1634	Tango-no-kami (丹後守)	Lower 5th (従五位下)	85,000 koku
2	Inaba Masanori (稲葉正則)	1634–1683	Mimasaka-no-kami (美濃守)	Lower 4th (従四位下)	85,000->102,000 koku
3	Inaba Masamichi (稲葉正往)	1683–1685	Tango-no-kami (丹後守); Jiju (侍従)	Lower 4th (従四位下)	102,000 koku
Ōkubo clan (fudai) 1686-1871
1	Ōkubo Tadatomo (大久保忠朝)	1686–1698	Kaga-no-kami (加賀守); Jiju (侍従)	Lower 4th (従四位下)	103,000->113,000 koku
2	Ōkubo Tadamasu (大久保忠増)	1698–1713	Ōkura-no-sho (大蔵少輔)	Lower 4th (従四位下)	113,000 koku
3	Ōkubo Tadamasa (大久保忠方)	1713–1732	Kaga-no-kami (加賀守)	Lower 4th (従四位下)	113,000 koku
4	Ōkubo Tadaoki (大久保忠興)	1732–1763	Ōkura-no-sho (大蔵少輔)	Lower 4th (従四位下)	113,000 koku
5	Ōkubo Tadayoshi (大久保忠由)	1763–1769	Kaga-no-kami (加賀守)	Lower 5th (従五位下)	113,000 koku
6	Ōkubo Tadaaki (大久保忠顕)	1769–1796	Kaga-no-kami (加賀守)	Lower 5th (従五位下)	113,000 koku
7	Ōkubo Tadazane (大久保忠真)	1796–1837	Kaga-no-kami (加賀守)	Lower 4th (従四位下)	113,000 koku
8	Ōkubo Tadanao (大久保忠愨)	1837–1859	Kaga-no-kami (加賀守)	Lower 4th (従四位下)	113,000 koku
9	Ōkubo Tadanori (大久保忠礼)	1859–1868	Kaga-no-kami (加賀守)	Lower 5th (従五位下)	113,000 koku
10	Ōkubo Tadayoshi (大久保忠良)	1868–1871	Kaga-no-kami (加賀守)	Lower 5th (従五位下)	113,000 koku

== Subsidiary domains ==
=== Ogino-Yamanaka Domain ===
Ogino-Yamanaka Domain was a subsidiary domain of Odawara Domain, established in 1783 when Ōkubo Norinobu, relocated his jin'ya from Matsunaga Domain in Suruga Province what is now Numazu, Shizuoka to Sagami Province in what is now part of Atsugi, Kanagawa. Matsunaga Domain had been created in 1698 for Ōkubo Norihiro, the younger son of Ōkubo Tadatomo. The domain had holdings scattered across Sagami, Suzuga and Izu provinces. During the Bakumatsu period, the domain was assigned to guard Kofu Castle in Kai Province. In 1867, while most of the samurai were still in Kofu, anti-Tokugawa partisans burned the jin'ya of the domain to the ground. After the Meiji restoration, in 1871, with the abolition of the han system, the domain became Ogino-Yamanaka Prefecture, which was merged into Kanagawa Prefecture in 1876.

- Okubo clan 1783-1871(fudai)

	Name	Tenure	Courtesy title	Court Rank	kokudaka
1	Ōkubo Norinobu (大久保教翅)	1783–1796	Nakatsukasa-no-taifu (中務大輔)	Lower 5th (従五位下)	13,000 koku
2	Ōkubo Noritaka (大久保教孝)	1796–1845	Izumo-no-kami (出雲守)	Lower 5th (従五位下)	13,000 koku
3	Ōkubo Noriyoshi (大久保教義)	1845–1871	Nakatsukasa-no-taifu (中務大輔)	Lower 5th (従五位下)	13,000 koku
