= Ōkubo Tadayo =

Samurai of the Sengoku era; major samurai ally of the Tokugawa clan

- 大久保 忠世
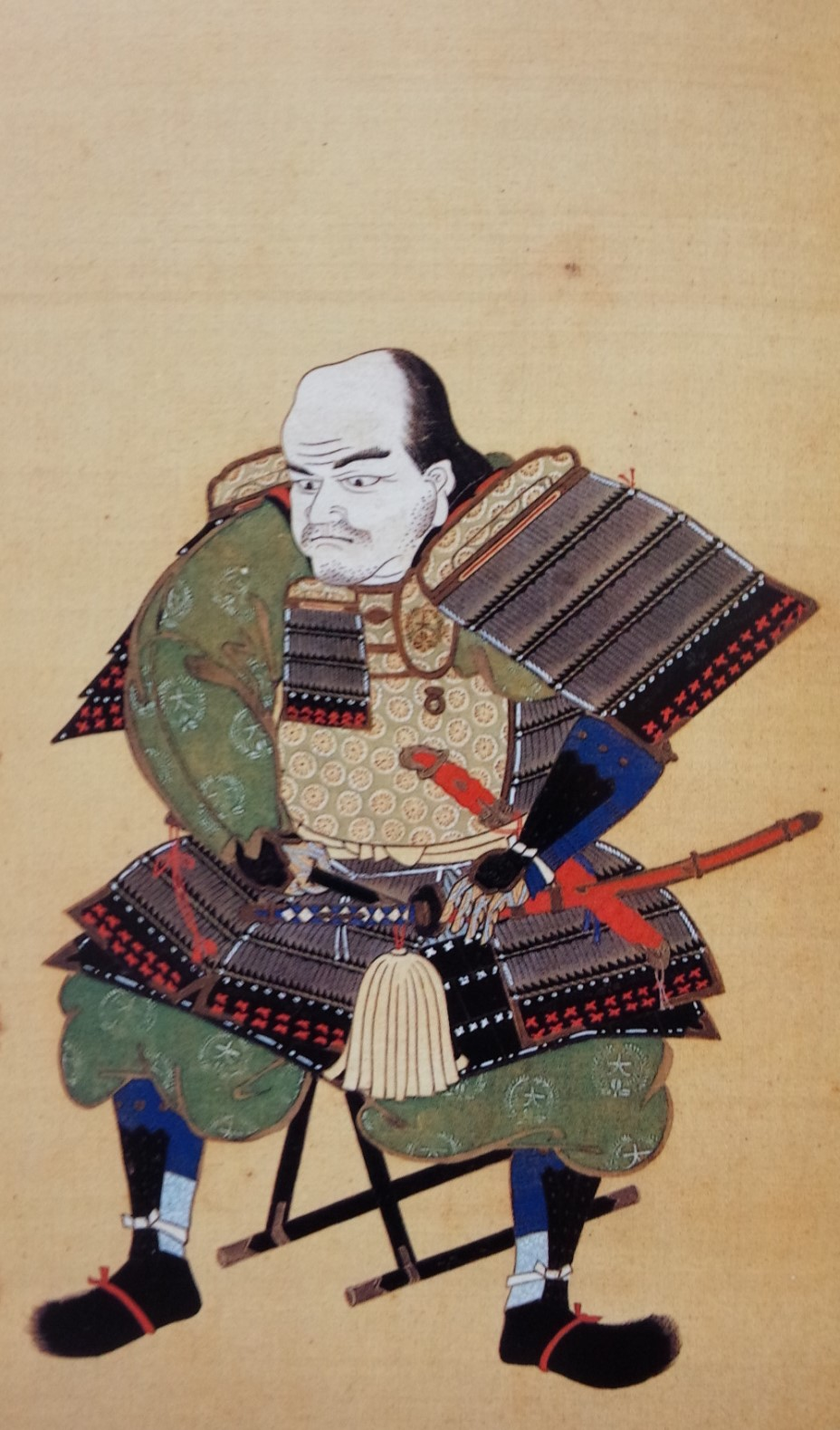

Lord of Odawara
- In office 1590–1594
- Succeeded by: Ōkubo Tadachika

Personal details
- Born: 1532 Okazaki, Aichi
- Died: October 28, 1594 (aged 61–62) Odawara, Kanagawa
- Nickname: "Shinjuro"

Military service
- Allegiance: Okubo clan Tokugawa clan
- Commands: Futamata Castle, Komoro Castle; Odawara Castle
- Battles/wars: Battle of Azukizaka (1564); Battle of Mikatagahara (1573); Battle of Nagashino (1575); Battle of Komaki-Nagakute (1584); Siege of Odawara (1590)

Ōkubo Tadayo (大久保 忠世; 1532 – October 28, 1594) was a Japanese samurai and general who served Tokugawa Ieyasu in the Azuchi–Momoyama period. He was daimyo of Odawara Domain from 1590 to 1594.

== Early life ==
Tadayo was the eldest son of Ōkubo Tadakazu, a hereditary retainer of the Tokugawa clan. He was born in what is now part of Okazaki in Mikawa Province. Tadayo's nickname was Shinjuro (新十郎).

== Career ==
He rose to become considered one of Ieyasu's sixteen generals and was entrusted with Futamata Castle in Tōtōmi Province. Tadayo participated in the Battle of Azukizaka (1564) against the Ikkō sect in Mikawa Province.

At the Battle of Mikatagahara in 1573, Tadayo, along with Amano Yasukage, led a small band of Tokugawa foot soldiers and matchlock gunners in an attack against the Takeda camp, throwing the vanguard of the Takeda army into confusion.

In 1574, Ōga Yashirō, a minor official of Tokugawa clan, colluded with the Takeda clan to overthrow Tokugawa Ieyasu. On the order of the Okazaki magistrate, Ōoka Tadasuke, Tadayo immediately caught Yashirō and paraded him around Hamamatsu Castle, before executing him brutally by mutilating him alive with a saw and crucifying Yashirō's wife and children.

Tadayo accompanied Tokugawa Ieyasu in all of his campaigns, including the Battle of Nagashino (1575).

Upon the assassination of Oda Nobunaga in 1582, Ieyasu expanded his rule into Shinano Province, with Ōkubo Tadayo assigned to manage the campaign from his base at Komoro Castle.

After the Battle of Odawara (1590), Ieyasu was transferred from the Tōkai region to the provinces of the Kantō region. Toyotomi Hideyoshi ordered that Ōkubo Tadayo be raised at that point to the status of daimyō, and was assigned the fief of Odawara, with an income of 45,000 koku. He continued to rule in Odawara until his death in 1594, and was succeeded by his son, Ōkubo Tadachika.

Preceded by none	Daimyo of Odawara; 1590–1594	Succeeded by Ōkubo Tadachika
