= Tadayoshi =

- Gender: Male

Origin
- Origin: Japanese
- Meaning: Different meanings depending on the kanji used

Tadayoshi (written: 忠義, 忠吉, 忠良, 忠善, 忠美, 忠由 or 直義) is a masculine Japanese given name. Notable people with the name include:

- Ashikaga Tadayoshi (足利 直義; 1306–1352), Japanese samurai
- Tadayoshi Hayashi (林 忠義; born 1968), Japanese equestrian
- Ichijō Tadayoshi (一条 忠良; 1774–1837), Japanese kugyō
- Tadayoshi Ichida (市田 忠義; born 1942), Japanese politician
- Tadayoshi Nagashima (長島 忠美; born 1951), Japanese politician
- Nishio Tadayoshi (西尾 忠善; 1768–1831), Japanese daimyō
- Ōkubo Tadayoshi (I) (大久保 忠由; 1736–1769), Japanese daimyō
- Ōkubo Tadayoshi (II) (大久保 忠良; 1857–1877), Japanese daimyō
- Tadayoshi Okura (大倉 忠義; born 1985), Japanese idol, singer and actor
- Tadayoshi Sano (佐野 忠義; 1889–1945), Japanese general
- Satomi Tadayoshi (里見 忠義; 1594–1622), Japanese samurai and daimyō
- Shimazu Tadayoshi (島津 忠良; 1493–1568), Japanese daimyō
- Shimazu Tadayoshi (2nd) (島津 忠義; 1840–1897), Japanese daimyō
- Torii Tadayoshi (鳥居 忠吉; died 1571), Japanese samurai
- Tadayoshi Yokota (横田 忠義; 1947–2023), Japanese volleyball player
