= Zhongyi =

Zhongyi may refer to:

- Zhongyi (name)
- Zhongyi Circuit (忠義, headquartered in modern Xiangyang, Hubei)
- Zhongyi metro station, a station of the Taipei Metro
- Zhongyi Road station
- Zhongyi Village (忠義里), a village in Daya District, Taichung City, Taiwan
- Zhongyi Village (忠義里), a village in Luzhou District, New Taipei City, Taiwan
- Zhongyi Village (忠義里), a village in Zhongli District, Taoyuan City, Taiwan
- Zhongyi (中衣), an inner garment of Hanfu
- Hafei Zhongyi, a cabover microvan

== See also ==
- 忠義 (disambiguation)
