= Ōkubo Tadanori =

Japanese daimyō

Ōkubo Tadanori 大久保忠礼
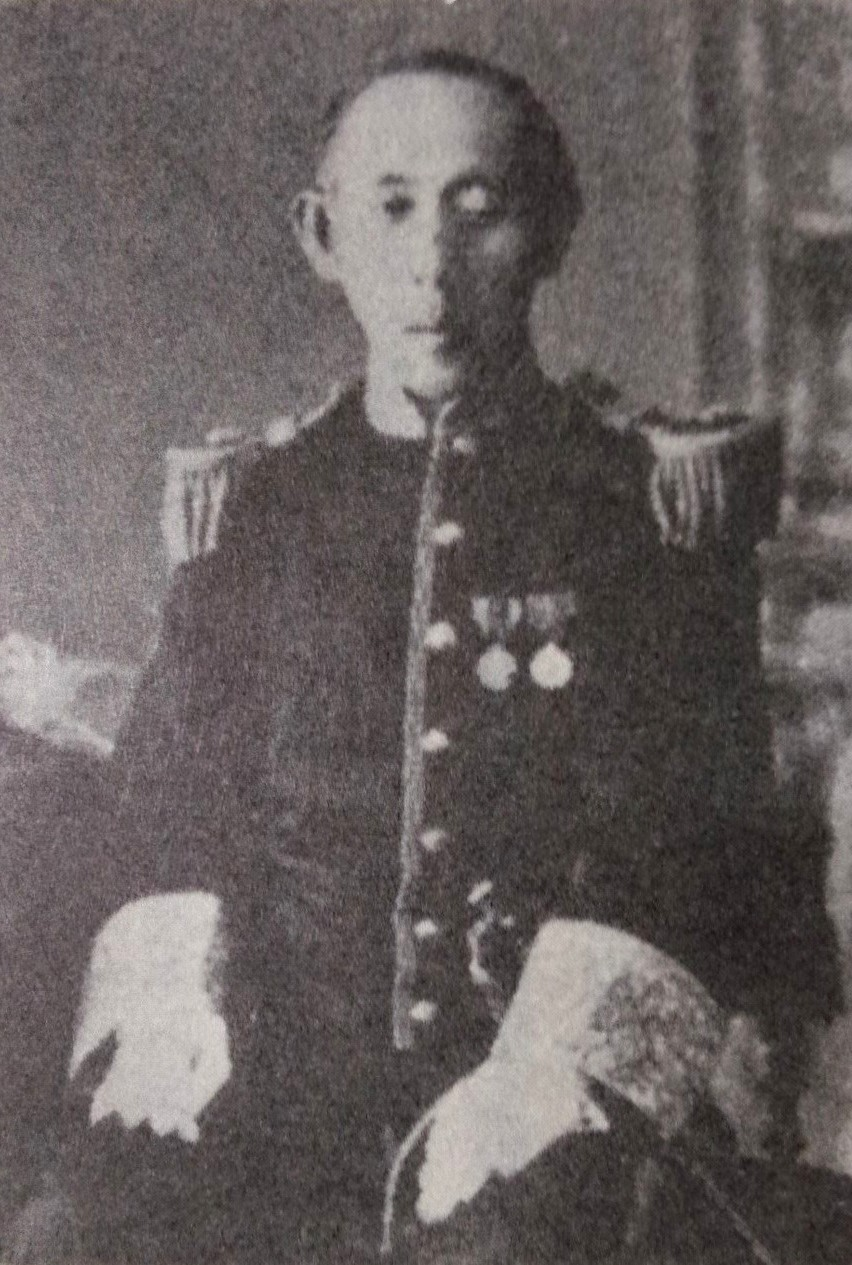
- Born: January 13, 1842; Edo, Japan
- Died: August 10, 1897 (aged 55)
- Other names: Kaga no Kami
- Occupation: Daimyō of Odawara Domain (1859–1868)

Ōkubo Tadanori (大久保 忠礼; January 13, 1842 – August 10, 1897) was the 9th daimyō of Odawara Domain in Sagami Province, (modern-day Kanagawa Prefecture) in late-Edo period Japan. Before the Meiji Restoration, his courtesy title was Kaga no Kami.

== Biography ==
Ōkubo Tadanori was the nephew of Tokugawa Nariaki, which made him a cousin to Shōgun Tokugawa Yoshinobu. He was born as the 5th son of Matsudaira Yorihiro, daimyō of Takamatsu Domain, in Sanuki Province. On the death of former daimyō of Odawara, Ōkubo Tadanao in 1859 he was adopted into the Ōkubo clan as 11th clan head, and by default, daimyō of Odawara Domain. He served in a number of posts within the administration of the Tokugawa shogunate, including that of Sōshaban (Master of Ceremonies) in November 1863, and accompanied Shōgun Tokugawa Iemochi on his visit to Kyoto in 1864. He was briefly appointed Kōfu jōdai from September to December 1867.

During the Boshin War of the Meiji Restoration, he permitted the pro-Imperial forces of the Satchō Alliance to cross Hakone Pass without opposition. However, in May 1868 he met with Hayashi Tadataka and other members of the pro-Tokugawa resistance and indicated his willingness to support their cause. With the fall of Edo to the Satchō Alliance, he changed sides again, and met with the leaders of the Satchō Alliance in Edo to plead his case. Considered a traitor to the imperial cause, he was ordered to retire from public life, and his titles were transferred to Ōkubo Tadayoshi, daimyō of Ogino-Yamanaka Domain, a cadet house of the Odawara Domain.

In July 1875, when Tadayoshi retired from public life, Tadanori returned to the leadership of the Ōkubo clan. In 1884, with the establishment of the kazoku peerage system, he was made a viscount (shishaku). He died on August 10, 1897, and his grave is at the clan temple of Saisho-ji in Setagaya, Tokyo.

| Preceded by Ōkubo Tadanao | 9th Daimyō of Odawara; 1859–1868 | Succeeded by Ōkubo Tadayoshi |
