= Ōkubo Tadanao =

Japanese daimyō

Ōkubo Tadanao 大久保忠愨
- Born: March 20, 1829
- Died: March 20, 1859 (aged 30)
- Other names: Kaga no Kami
- Occupation: Daimyō of Odawara Domain (1837-1858)
- Spouse: daughter of Shimazu Narinobu

Ōkubo Tadanao (大久保 忠愨; March 20, 1829 – December 23, 1859) was the 8th daimyō of Odawara Domain in Sagami Province, (modern-day Kanagawa Prefecture) in late-Edo period Japan. His courtesy title was Kaga no Kami.

== Biography ==
Ōkubo Tadanao was the posthumous son of Ōkubo Tadanaga, son and heir of the 7th daimyō of Odawara, Ōkubo Tadazane. He was adopted by his grandfather, who, however, died in 1837, leaving him as 10th clan head and daimyō of Odawara at the age of 9. He soon came under the influence of the faction of conservative councilors who rejected the radical reforms of his grandfather's senior councilor, Ninomiya Sontoku, eventually reversing many of the gains made. During his tenure, he was assigned additional duties in guarding the coastline of Izu Province against the incursions of foreign ships and was held responsible for the security of the American legation at Shimoda, where Townsend Harris negotiated the Treaty of Amity and Commerce in 1858.

Although married to a daughter of Shimazu Narinobu of Satsuma Domain, he died without heir in 1859.

Preceded by Ōkubo Tadazane	8th Daimyō of Odawara; 1837-1859	Succeeded by Ōkubo Tadanori
