= Naoyoshi =

- Gender: Male

Origin
- Origin: Japanese
- Meaning: Different meanings depending on the kanji used

Naoyoshi (written: 直吉, 尚純, 尚嘉, 直彬, 直好, 尚義, 直善 or 直義) is a masculine Japanese given name. Notable people with the name include:

- Murakoshi Naoyoshi (村越 直吉; 1562-1614), Japanese samurai
- Naoyoshi Shiotani (塩谷 直義; born 1977), Japanese director
