= Ōkubo Tadayoshi (II) =

Japanese daimyō

Ōkubo Tadayoshi 大久保忠良
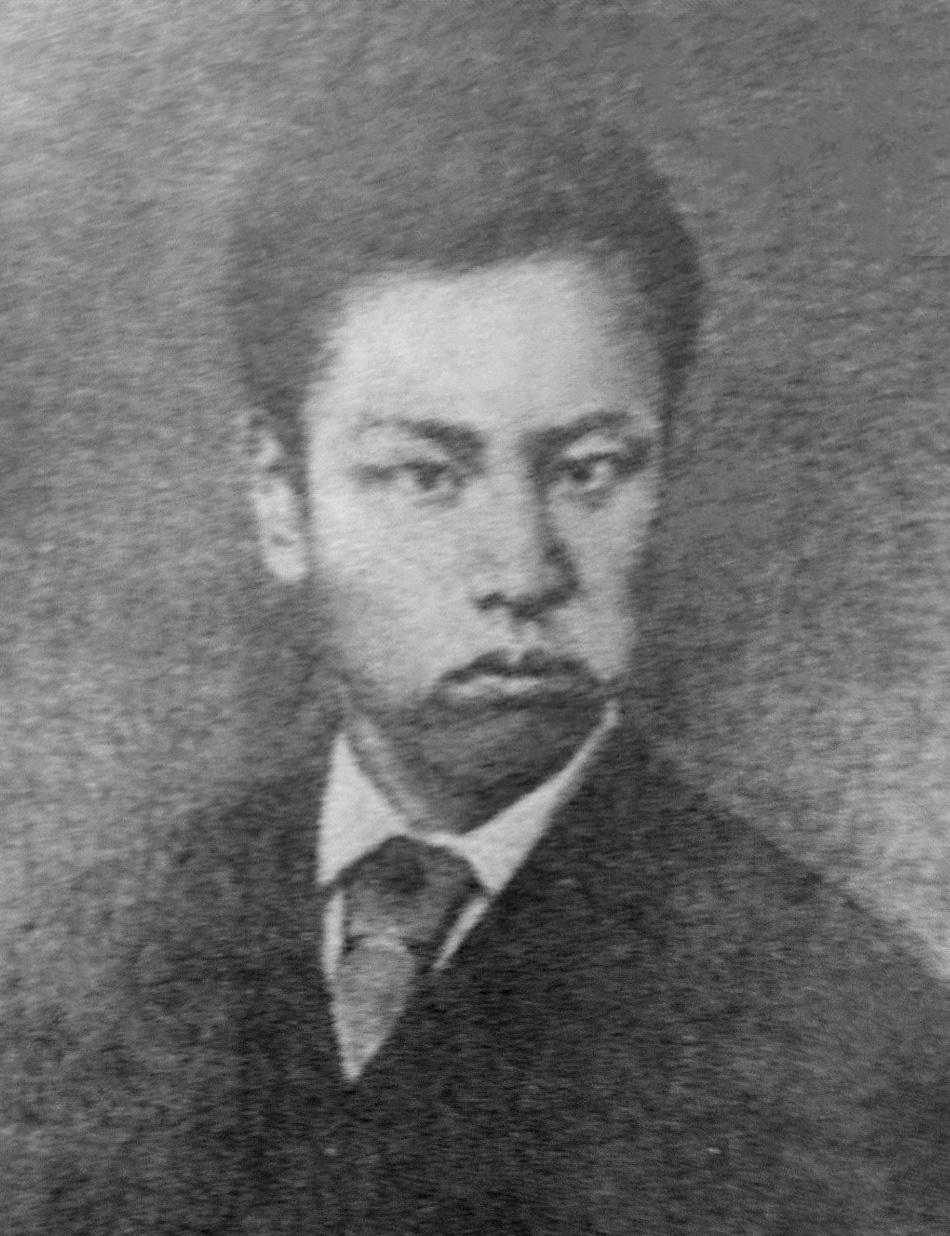
- Born: May 27, 1857; Edo, Japan
- Died: March 29, 1877 (aged 19); Kumamoto Prefecture
- Occupation: Daimyō of Odawara Domain (1868–1871)

Ōkubo Tadayoshi (大久保 忠良; May 27, 1857 – March 29, 1877) was the 10th and final daimyō of Odawara Domain in Sagami Province, (modern-day Kanagawa Prefecture) in Bakumatsu period Japan. Before the Meiji Restoration, his courtesy title was Kaga no Kami.

== Biography ==
Ōkubo Tadayoshi was born as the eldest son of Ōkubo Noriyoshi, daimyō of Ogino-Yamanaka Domain, a cadet house of the Odawara Domain, at the domain's residence in Edo. The former daimyō of Odawara, Ōkubo Tadanori, was forced into retirement in 1868 due to his opposition to the Meiji Restoration, Tadayoshi became 12th head of the Odawara Ōkubo clan and by default, the 10th daimyō of Odawara Domain. However, the Meiji government reduced his revenues from 113,000 koku to 75,000 koku, given the Ōkubo clan's lack of support to the imperial cause during the Boshin War. Tadayoshi was appointed domain governor on June 22, 1868, holding that post to the abolition of the han system in 1871. Citing ill health, he retired from public life in 1875, and returned the leadership of the Ōkubo clan to Ōkubo Tadanori.

However, in 1877, Tadayoshi participated in the Satsuma Rebellion, and was killed in combat in Kumamoto Prefecture on March 29, 1877. His grave is at the clan temple of Saisho-ji in Setagaya, Tokyo.

Preceded by Ōkubo Tadanori	10th Daimyō of Odawara; 1868–1871	Succeeded by none
