= Ōkubo clan =

Japanese clan

Ōkubo 大久保
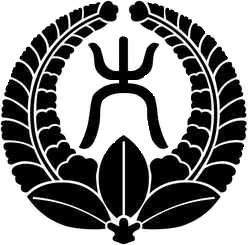
- Ōkubo clan mon
- Home province: Mikawa
- Parent house: Fujiwara clan via the Utsunomiya clan
- Titles: daimyō, viscount
- Founder: Ōkubo Tadatoshi
- Final ruler: Ōkubo Tadayoshi (II)
- Founding year: 15th century
- Dissolution: still extant
- Ruled until: 1873 (Abolition of the han system)
- Cadet branches: four cadet branches to the Meiji Restoration

The Ōkubo clan (Japanese: 大久保氏, Hepburn: Ōkubo-shi) were a samurai kin group which rose to prominence in the Sengoku period and the Edo periods. Under the Tokugawa shogunate, the Ōkubo, as hereditary vassals of the Tokugawa clan, were classified as one of the fudai daimyō clans.

== Ōkubo clan genealogy ==
The Ōkubo clan traces its origins to 16th century Mikawa Province. The Ōkubo claimed descent from the Utsunomiya clan, descendants of Fujiwara no Michikane (955–995). Ōkubo Tadatoshi (1499–1581) and his younger brother Ōkubo Tadakazu (1511–1583) were the first to abandon the Utsunomiya name for "Ōkubo". Both brothers were among the seven closest retainers of Matsudaira Hirotada, the father of Tokugawa Ieyasu.

=== Main branch ===
- Ōkubo Tadayo (1531–1593), the son of Ōkubo Tadakazu, participated as a general in all the military campaigns of Tokugawa Ieyasu. In 1590, upon the transfer of Ieyasu to the Kantō region, he was rewarded with formal recognition as a daimyō, and the clan was established in the han of Odawara (45,000 koku) in Sagami Province, where the Ōkubo were made castellans Odawara Castle. The main branch of Ōkubo clan consists of his family and their descendants.
  - Ōkubo Tadachika (1553–1628) succeeded his father at Odawara, and the revenues of the han had increased to 70,000 koku. In 1614 Tadachika was accused of participation in the plot of Tokugawa Tadateru against his brother, Shōgun Tokugawa Hidetada; and the Ōkubo were dispossessed. Tadahicka was confined at Hikone in Ōmi Province.
  - Ōkubo Tadamoto (1604–1670) was implicated initially in the disgrace of his grandfather; however, he was installed in 1632 at Kanō Domain (50,000 koku) in Mino Province, and then he was transferred in 1639 to Akashi Domain in Harima Province. He was transferred again in 1649 to Karatsu Domain (90,000 koku) in Hizen Province, and he was moved again in 1678 to Sakura Domain in Shimōsa Province. This senior branch of the Ōkubo was restored to Odawara Domain (100,000 koku), where they resided until the Meiji Restoration. The final daimyō of Odawara Domain, Ōkubo Tadayoshi died in the Satsuma Rebellion.

The head of this clan, Ōkubo Tadanori line was ennobled as a viscount ("shishaku") in the kazoku peerage system.

=== Cadet lines ===
- A cadet branch was created in 1601 for Ōkubo Tadasuke (1537–1613), the second son of Ōkubo Tadakazu, who had served as a general in the armies of Tokugawa Ieyasu. Ōkubo Tadasuke was given Numazu Castle and assigned Numazu Domain (20,000 koku) in Suruga Province; however, he died without leaving any heirs, and the domain reverted to the shogunate.
- A cadet branch of the Ōkubo was created in 1684. The descendants of Ōkubo Tadatame (1554–1616), the sixth son of Ōkubo Tadakazu, has served as hatamoto to the Tokugawa shogunate. In 1687, Ōkubo Tadataka had amassed a revenue base of 10,000 koku, which qualified him to join the ranks of the daimyō. His son, Ōkubo Tsuneharu (1675–1728) was assigned to Karasuyama Domain (30,000 koku) in Shimotsuke Province in 1725, where his descendants remained until the Meiji restoration. The head of this clan line, Ōkubo Tadayori, was ennobled as a "Viscount" in the Meiji period.
- A cadet branch of the Ōkubo was created in 1706. This clan line was instituted for the descendants of Ōkubo Norihiro (1657–1737), who were installed at Ogino-Yamanaka Domain (13,000 koku) in Sagami Province from 1718 through 1868. The head of this clan line was ennobled as a "Viscount" in the Meiji period.

=== Indirect Ōkubo kazoku lines ===
- Ōkubo Toshimichi, 1830–1878—1st Finance Minister and 1st Home Minister of Meiji's government. Genrō. was the son of a low-ranking samurai in the service of the Satsuma clan in Kagoshima. He claimed descent from a branch of the Ōkubo clan who migrated to Satsuma Province from Kyoto during the Sengoku period. For his services to the Meiji government, he was offered peerage as marquess (koshaku) under the kazoku peerage in 1884 but he declined and the peerage was instead given to his eldest son and heir Marquess Toshikazu.
- In 1877, a former samurai from Suruga Province, Ōkubo Ichio (1817–1888) was ennobled as a "Viscount" under the kazoku system. Ōkubo Ichio had served as councilor to the last five Tokugawa shōguns, and during the Boshin War, had served as an emissary for Tokugawa Yoshinobu to negotiate the surrender of Edo to imperial forces. Under the Meiji government, he served as appointed governor of Shizuoka (1870) and Kyoto (1875), and as a member of the Genrōin (1877). He was also known as Ōkubo Tadahiro.
