= Odawara-juku =

Ninth of the 53 stations of the Tōkaidō in Japan

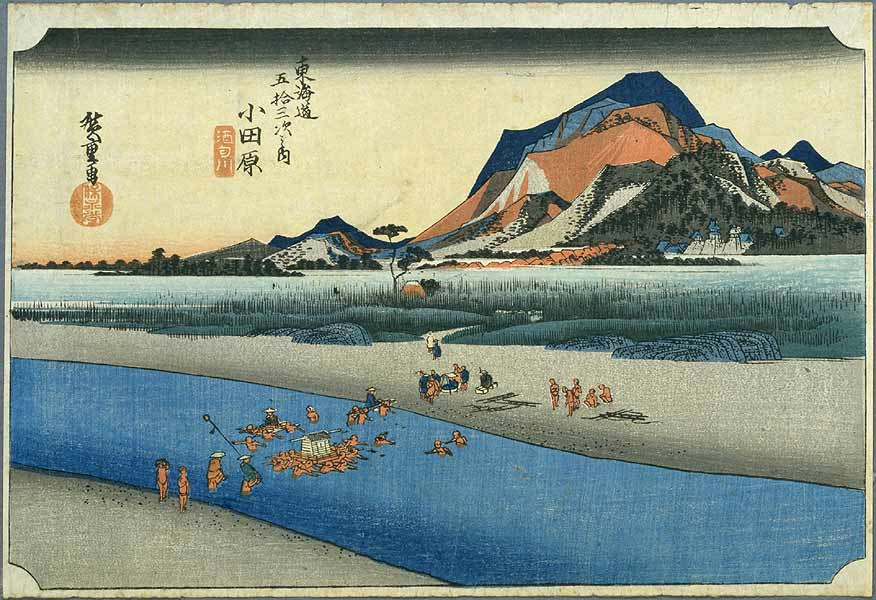
Odawara-juku in the 1830s, as depicted by Hiroshige in The Fifty-three Stations of the Tōkaidō

Odawara-juku (小田原宿, Odawara-juku) was the ninth of the fifty-three stations of the Tōkaidō. It is located in the present-day city of Odawara, Kanagawa Prefecture, Japan. It was the first post station in a castle town that travelers came to when they exited Edo (modern-day Tokyo) in Edo period Japan.

== History ==
Odawara-juku was established between the mountains of Hakone and Sagami Bay, near Odawara Castle. Located near the banks of the Sakawa River, Odawara-juku was a famous post station. It is said to hold the remains of Lady Kasuga.

== Neighboring post towns ==
Tōkaidō
Ōiso-juku - Odawara-juku - Hakone-juku
