= Sagami Province =

Former province of Japan

Map of Japanese provinces with Sagami province highlighted

Sagami Province (相模国, Sagami no Kuni) (Note: Japanese pronunciation: [sä́.ɡä̀.mʲì (nò̞ kɯ̈̀.ɲ̟ì), sä́.ŋä̀.mʲì (nò̞ kɯ̈̀.ɲ̟ì), sä̀.ɡä́.mʲí (nò̞ kɯ̈̀.ɲ̟ì), sä̀.ŋä́.mʲí (nò̞ kɯ̈̀.ɲ̟ì)]) was a province of Japan located in what is today the central and western Kanagawa Prefecture. Sagami Province bordered the provinces of Izu, Musashi, and Suruga. It had access to the Pacific Ocean through Sagami Bay. However, most of the present-day cities of Yokohama and Kawasaki, now part of Kanagawa Prefecture, were not in Sagami, but rather, in Musashi Province. Its abbreviated form name was Sōshū (相州).

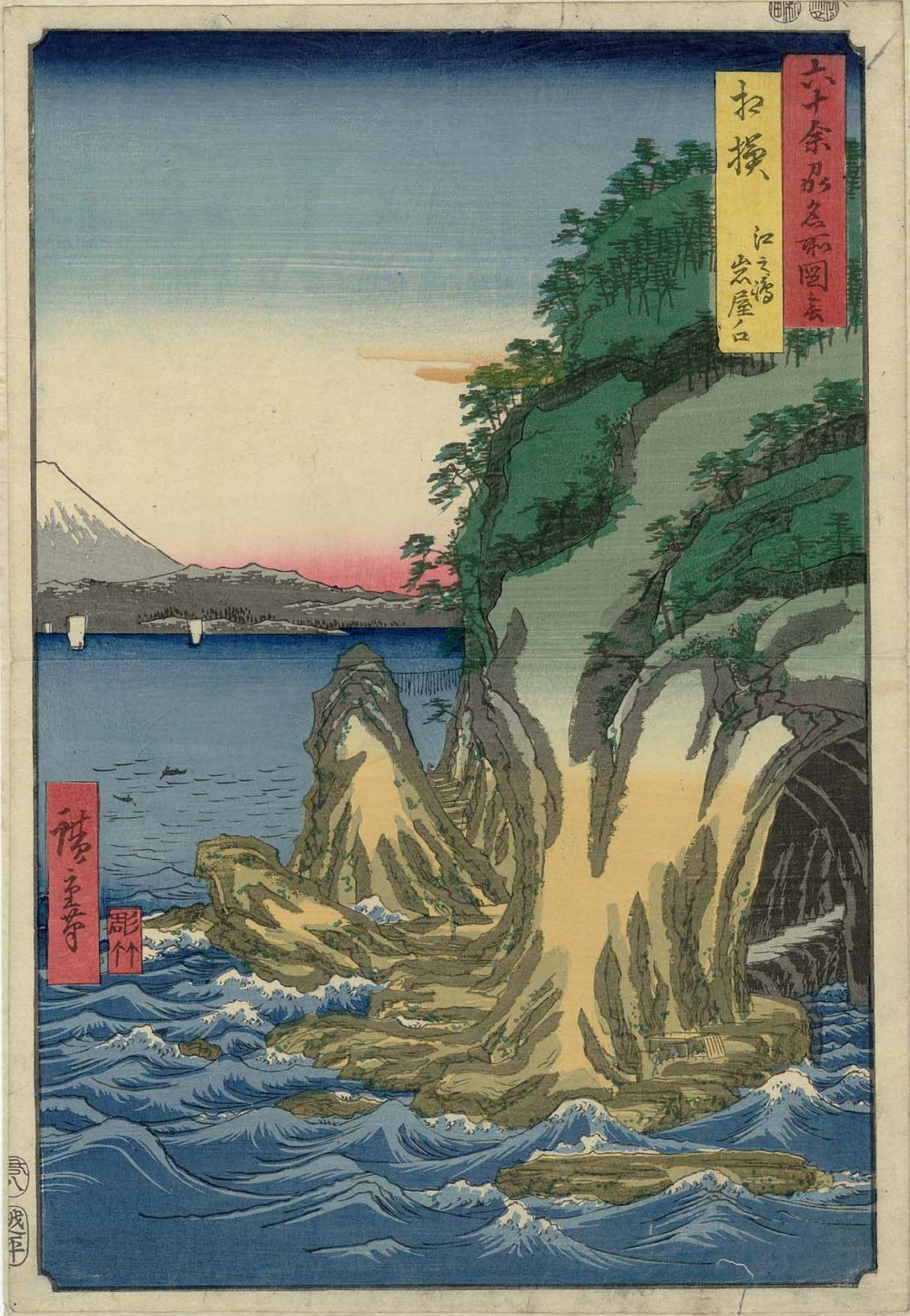
Ukiyo-e print by Hiroshige "Sagami" in The Famous Scenes of the Sixty States (六十余州名所図会), depicting Enoshima and Mount Fuji

== History ==
Sagami was one of the original provinces of Japan established in the Nara period under the Taihō Code. The area has been inhabited since prehistoric times. Although remnants from the Japanese Paleolithic and Yayoi periods are scarce, remains from the Jōmon period are relatively plentiful. Kofun period remains are generally from the 1st to the 4th century AD. Whether or not Sagami was originally part of Musashi prior to the Nara period is still a topic of controversy.

The original capital of the province may have been located in what is now Hiratsuka, although other contenders include Ōiso and Ebina. Of all the former provinces of Japan, Sagami is the only in which the ruins of the Nara period capital have yet to be found. The Kokubun-ji is located in what is now Ebina. Under the Engishiki classification system, Sagami was ranked as a "major country" (上国, jōkoku) in terms of importance and a "faraway country" (遠国, ongoku), in terms of distance from the capital. It was also included as one of the Tōkaidō provinces and was governed by a Kuni no miyatsuko.

Samukawa jinja was designated as the chief Shinto shrine (ichinomiya) for the province.

Records of Sagami during the Heian period are sparse, but during this period large shōen controlled by various warrior-class clans developed. The Miura clan was one of the most powerful of these clans. During the Kamakura period, Sagami was the center of the Kamakura shogunate, based in Kamakura, founded by Minamoto no Yoritomo and subsequently controlled by his former stewards, the Hōjō clan.

The province came under the control of the Uesugi clan for much of the Sengoku period, and was a highly contested territory, before the consolidation under the rule of the Later Hōjō clan based at Odawara. After the defeat of the Later Hōjō clan at the hands of Toyotomi Hideyoshi in 1590, Sagami was part of the territory in the Kantō region which came under the rule of Tokugawa Ieyasu. With the establishment of the Tokugawa shogunate, the western portion of the province formed Odawara Domain, and the remainder of the province was tenryō territory under direct administrative control of the Tokugawa shogunate, ruled though a number of hatamoto administrators. A number of feudal domains from outside Sagami Province also had small scattered holdings within the province.

During the Edo period, Sagami prospered due to its location on the Tōkaidō road connecting Edo with Kyoto, and numerous post towns developed. Uraga, at the entrance to Edo Bay was a major maritime security checkpoint for ships entering or leaving the Shogunate capital. However, the 1703 Genroku earthquake caused severe damage to Odawara, destroying much of Odawara-juku. This was followed by further natural disasters, including the October 4, 1707 Hōei earthquake and the Hōei eruption of Mount Fuji in December of the same year.

During the Bakumatsu period, Kurihama in southern Miura Peninsula was the location of the first landing of American Commodore Matthew C. Perry and his fleet of black ships in 1853, which led eventually to the Treaty of Kanagawa, which opened Sagami to foreign visitation and led to the rapid development of Yokohama as a treaty port.

After the Meiji Restoration, Sagami Province was reorganized in 1871 into Odarawa, Ongino-Yamanaka, Karasuyama, Mito, Sakura, Oyumi, Mutsuura and Nishi-Ohira Prefectures. All for former Sagami Province became part of the new Kanagawa Prefecture in 1876.

== Historical districts ==
- Kanagawa Prefecture
  - Aikō District (愛甲郡)
  - Ashigarakami District (Upper Ashigara) (足柄上郡)
  - Ashigarashimo District (Lower Ashigara) (足柄下郡)
  - Kamakura District (鎌倉郡) - dissolved
  - Kōza District (高座郡)
  - Miura District (三浦郡)
  - Ōsumi District (大住郡) - merged with Yurugi District to become Naka District (中郡) on March 26, 1896
  - Tsukui District (津久井郡) - dissolved
  - Yurugi District (淘綾郡) - merged with Ōsumi District to become Naka District on March 26, 1896

== Bakumatsu period domains ==
| Name | type | daimyō | kokudaka | notes |
|---|---|---|---|---|
| Odawara Domain | fudai | Ōkubo | 113,000 koku | |

== Highways ==
- Tōkaidō – connecting Edo with Kyoto

== See also ==
- Shōnan, common name for Sagami Province's Sagami Bay coastline

== Bibliography ==
- Nussbaum, Louis-Frédéric and Käthe Roth. (2005). Japan encyclopedia. Cambridge: Harvard University Press. ISBN 978-0-674-01753-5; OCLC 58053128
- Papinot, Edmond. (1910). Historical and Geographic Dictionary of Japan. Tokyo: Librarie Sansaisha. OCLC 77691250
