= Okugome =

Okugome 奥米
- Town
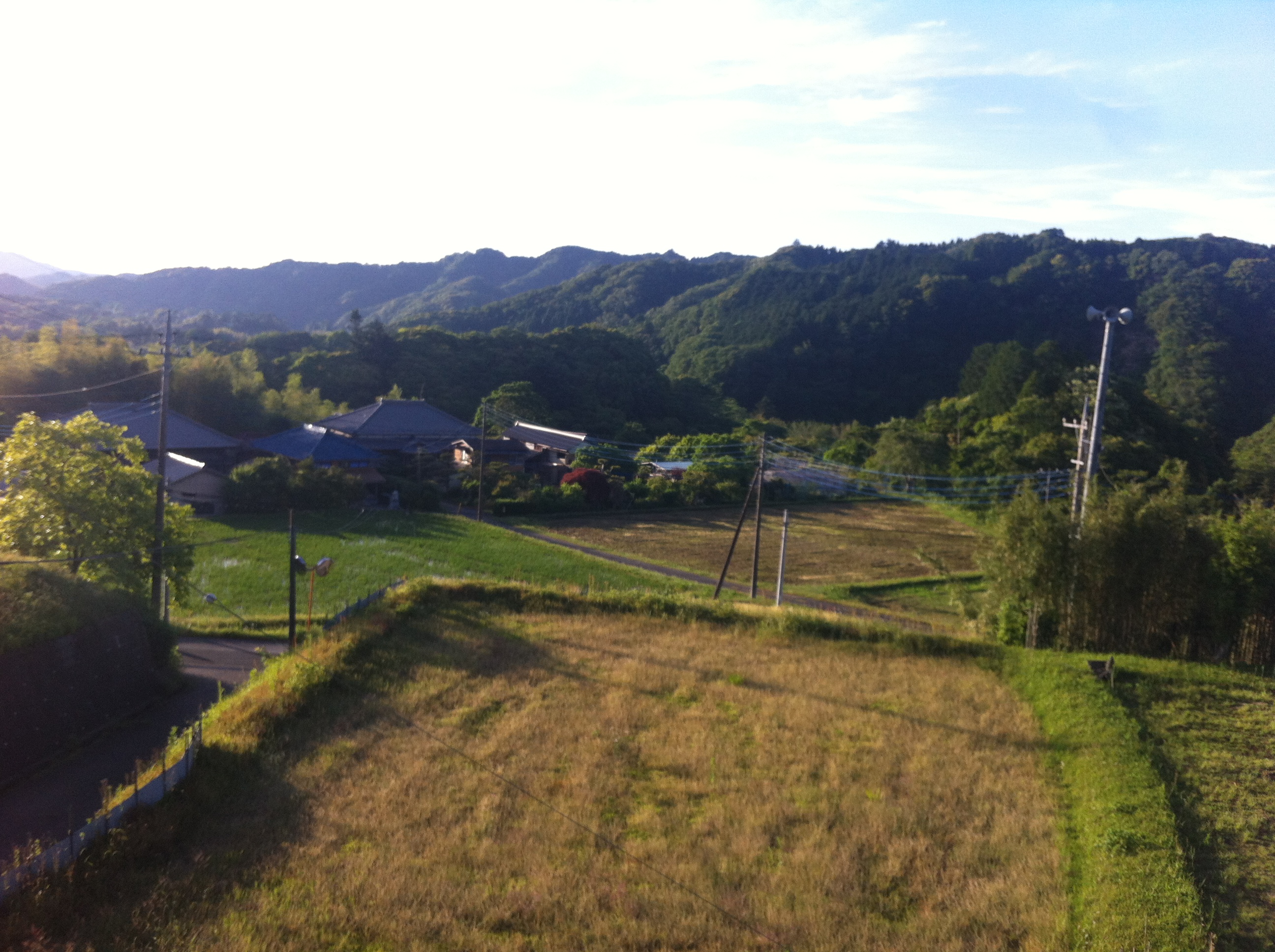
- Okugame farm in Chiba Prefecture

- Coordinates: 35.201°N 140.038°E
- Country: Japan
- Region: Kimitsu
- Prefecture: Chiba Prefecture

Area
  - Total: 23.72 km^{2} (9.16 sq mi)
- Time zone: UTC+9 (Japan Standard Time)

Okugome (奥米, Okugome) is a mountainous area located in Kimitsu, Chiba, Japan.

The town is situated in the middle of the mountains of the Bōsō Peninsula. There are no major towns or villages in Okugome, just isolated farms. The area would have been very isolated before the Okugome tunnel and other bridges were constructed.

== Geography ==
The Okugome area is mostly forest with a few small farms and is located on the south-central Bōsō Peninsula.

=== Surrounding Municipalities ===
- Tōgane, Chiba
- Sanbu, Chiba
- Ōamishirasato, Chiba

== History ==
Okugome was established in 1952, when the Okugome tunnel was built in order to access the area. It was previously only accessible via a mountain path. The Okugome tunnel is often suggested as haunted due to its curved construction. Japanese legend suggests tunnels, where you cannot see either end from the middle contain spirits, as they cannot escape.

== Economy ==
The only industry in the town is light farming on the small rice paddies.

== Transportation ==
=== Highway ===
Okugome is accessed from the Boso Skyline in the north.

== Local attractions ==
- Okugome Tunnel
- Mishima Dam (Mishima Lake)
- Okugome Sudajī tree
- Nagaura & Shimizu Suspension Bridges (married couple bridges)

== Gallery ==
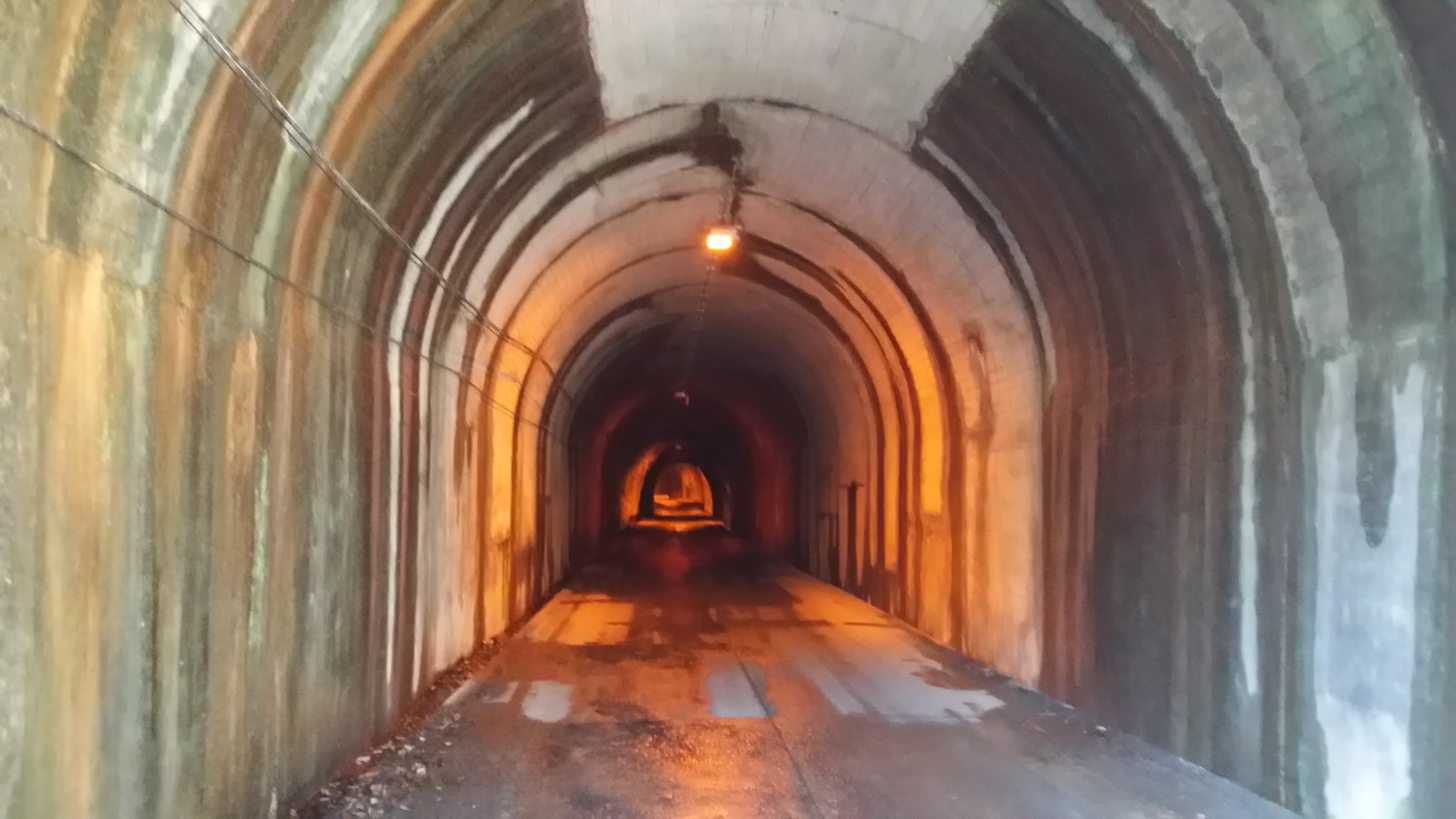
Tunnel into Okugome
