= Kameiwa cave =

Cave in Kimitsu, Chiba Prefecture, Japan

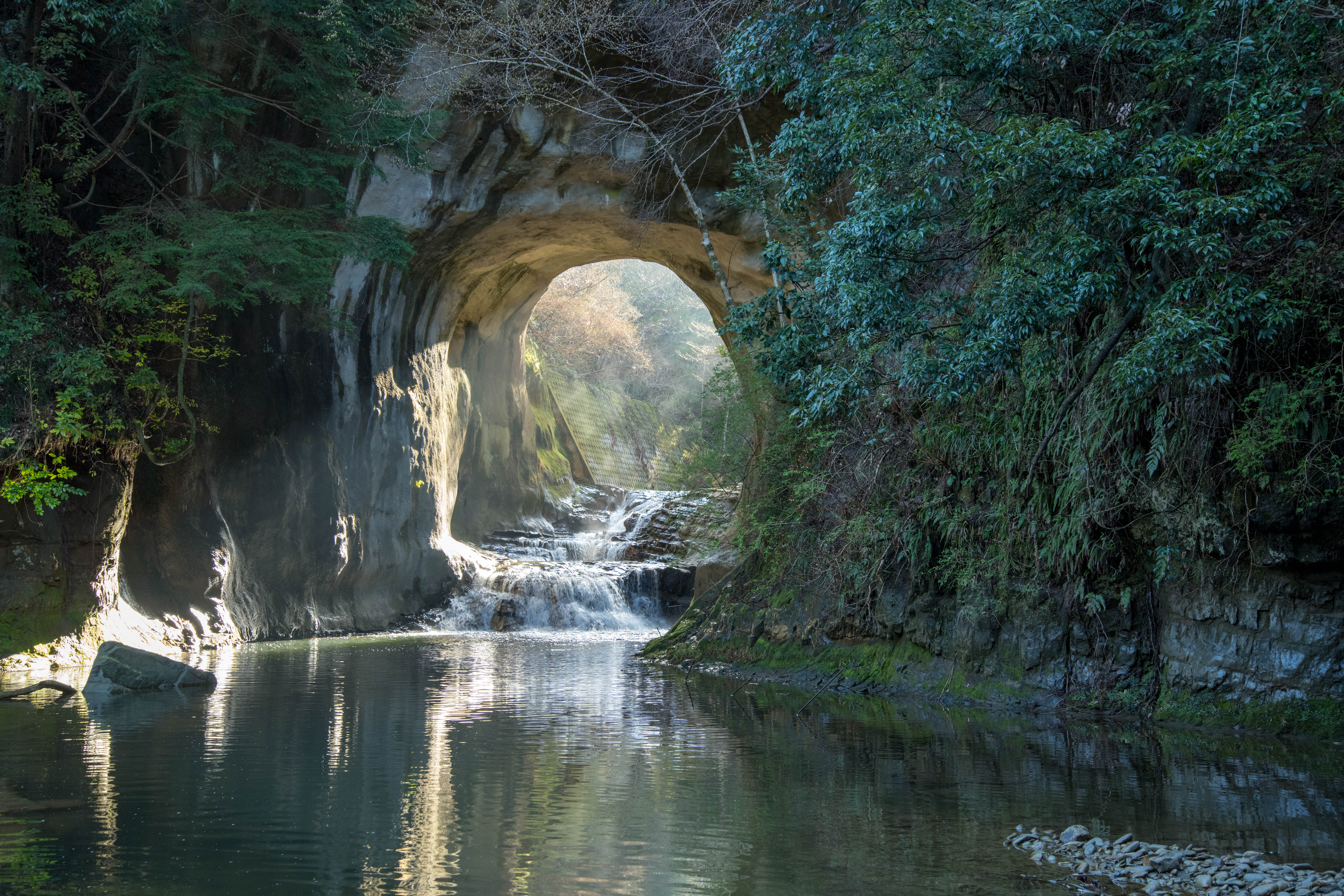
- Kameiwa cave with the Nōmizo waterfall

- Location within Japan
- Location: Kimitsu, Chiba Prefecture, Japan
- Coordinates: 35°11′7.4″N 140°3′36.3″E

Kameiwa cave and the Nōmizo waterfall that flows through it are located near the city of Kimitsu, Chiba Prefecture, Japan. While referred to as a cave, the Kameiwa cave is a tunnel bored during the Edo period to provide water for local agriculture. The cave and the waterfall gained attention in 2015, when photographs taken in the early morning of equinoxes posted on Instagram showed a heart-shaped image of sunlight through the cave above the waterfall.
