= Kururi Castle =

Coordinates: 35°17′15.27″N 140°05′24.1″E

Kururi Castle 久留里
- Kimitsu, Chiba Prefecture, Japan
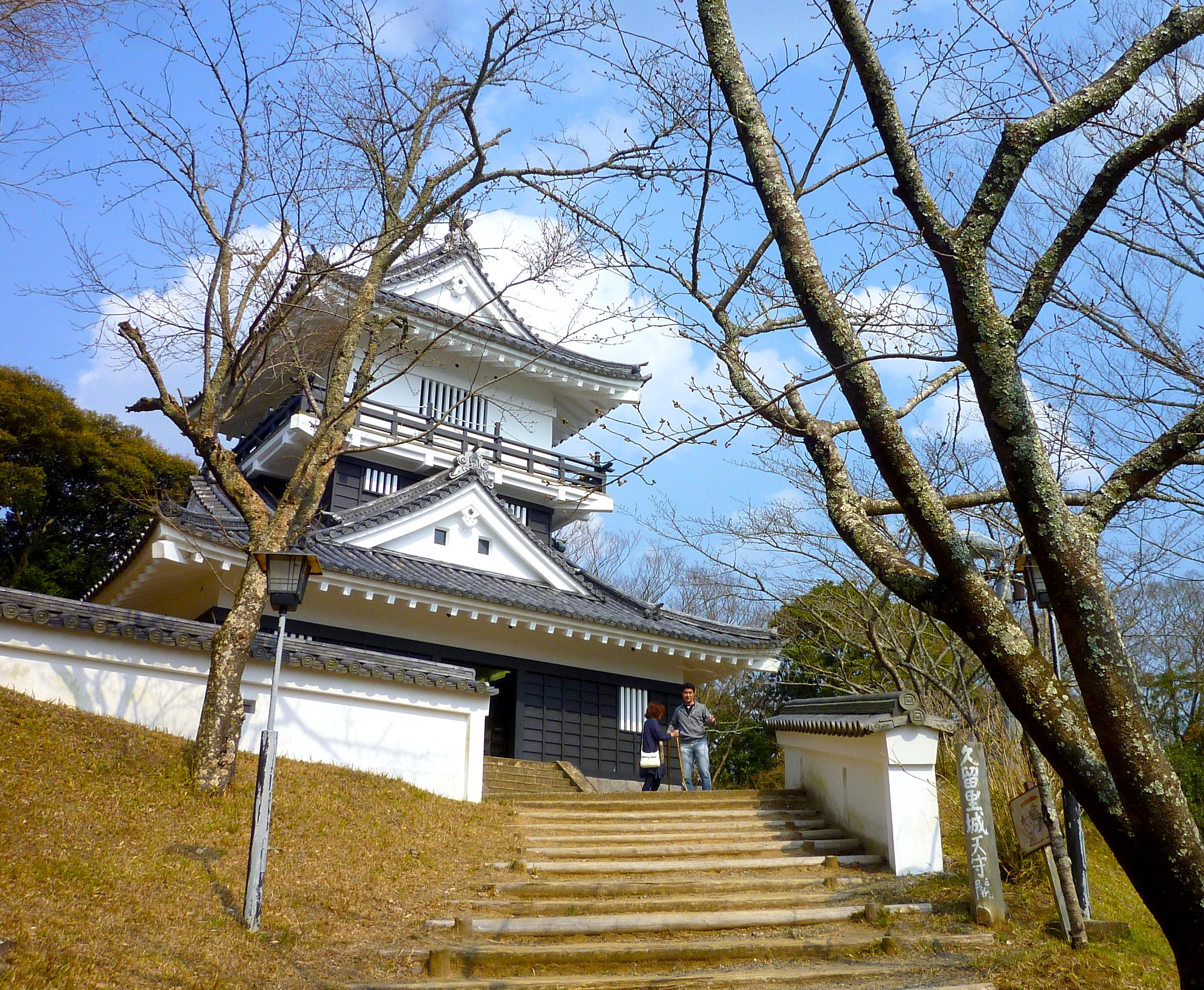
- Reconstructed Main Keep of Kururi Castle

Site information
- Type: hilltop-style Japanese castle
- Owner: reconstructed 1979
- Open to the public: yes

Location

Site history
- Built: 1456
- Built by: Satomi Yoshiyori, Kuroda Naozumi
- In use: Edo period
- Demolished: 1872

Kururi Castle (久留里城, Kururi-jō) is a Japanese castle located in Kimitsu, southern Chiba Prefecture, Japan. At the end of the Edo period, Kururi Castle was home to a branch of the Kuroda clan, daimyō of Kururi Domain. The castle was also known as Rain Castle (雨城, U-jō), after a legend that it rained twenty-one times during its construction, or, on average, once every three days. It is located on a 227 meter hill.

== History ==
The original Kururi Castle was a mountain-top fortification built during the Muromachi period by Takeda Nobunaga (1401–1477), and was ruled by his descendants, the Mariyatsu Takeda clan, from 1540. With the expansion of the Satomi clan from Awa Province in the Sengoku period, the castle was taken over by Satomi Yoshitaka, who used it as his base of operations against the Hōjō clan, based from Odawara Castle. The Hōjō attempted to take the castle unsuccessfully on a few occasions, and finally seized it in 1564. They lost it just three years later in 1567, when the Satomi regained control.

Following the Battle of Odawara, Toyotomi Hideyoshi punished the Satomi clan by depriving them of their territories in Kazusa Province. With the entry of Tokugawa Ieyasu into the Kantō region, he assigned the fortifications at Kururi to one of his retainers, Matsudaira (Ōsuga) Tadamasa, and appointed him as daimyō of the 30,000 koku Kururi Domain. Osugi Tadamasa built most of the current fortifications of Kururi Castle, and established a castle town at its base. Following the Battle of Sekigahara, the Ōsuga clan was transferred to Yokosuka Castle in Suruga Province, and were replaced by the Tsuchiya clan with a reduction in revenues to 20,000 koku. The domain was suppressed in 1679, and Kururi Castle was allowed to fall into ruin.

In 1742, Kururi Domain was reinstated, with Kuroda Naozumi transferred from Numata Domain in Kazusa Province. He rebuilt the fortifications of the old castle, and his descendants continued to rule Kururi Domain until the Meiji Restoration.

In 1872, by orders of the Meiji government, the surviving structures of Kururi Castle were destroyed. The area, containing remnants of moats, earthen works and a well, became a park in 1955. The current donjon was reconstructed in 1979 to boost local tourism. It was built adjacent to the earthen foundation of the original donjon. The Edo period donjon was a two-story, two-roofed structure; however the current structure is not historically accurate, and has three interior floors. The interior is a museum devoted primarily to local history exhibits.

== Literature ==
- De Lange, William (2021). An Encyclopedia of Japanese Castles. Groningen: Toyo Press. pp. 600 pages. ISBN 978-9492722300.
- Schmorleitz, Morton S. (1974). Castles in Japan. Tokyo: Charles E. Tuttle Co. pp. 144–145. ISBN 0-8048-1102-4.
- Motoo, Hinago (1986). Japanese Castles. Tokyo: Kodansha. p. 200 pages. ISBN 0-87011-766-1.
- Mitchelhill, Jennifer (2004). Castles of the Samurai: Power and Beauty. Tokyo: Kodansha. p. 112 pages. ISBN 4-7700-2954-3.
- Turnbull, Stephen (2003). Japanese Castles 1540-1640. Osprey Publishing. p. 64 pages. ISBN 1-84176-429-9.
