= Naosaku Takahashi =

Japanese social worker

Naosaku Takahashi 髙橋直作
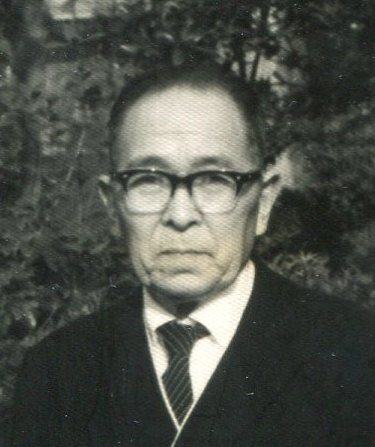
- July 2, 1967, Tokyo (80 years old)
- Born: Naosaku Yamanaka（山中直作） July 25, 1886; Tsuchiura City, Ibaraki Prefecture, Japan
- Died: January 22, 1976 (aged 89); Matsuyama City, Ehime Prefecture, Japan
- Education: Tokyo Institute of Technology (formerly Tokyo Higher Technical School), Salvation Army College for Officer Training at Tokyo
- Occupations: social worker, minister (the Salvation Army and the United Church of Christ in Japan), novelist

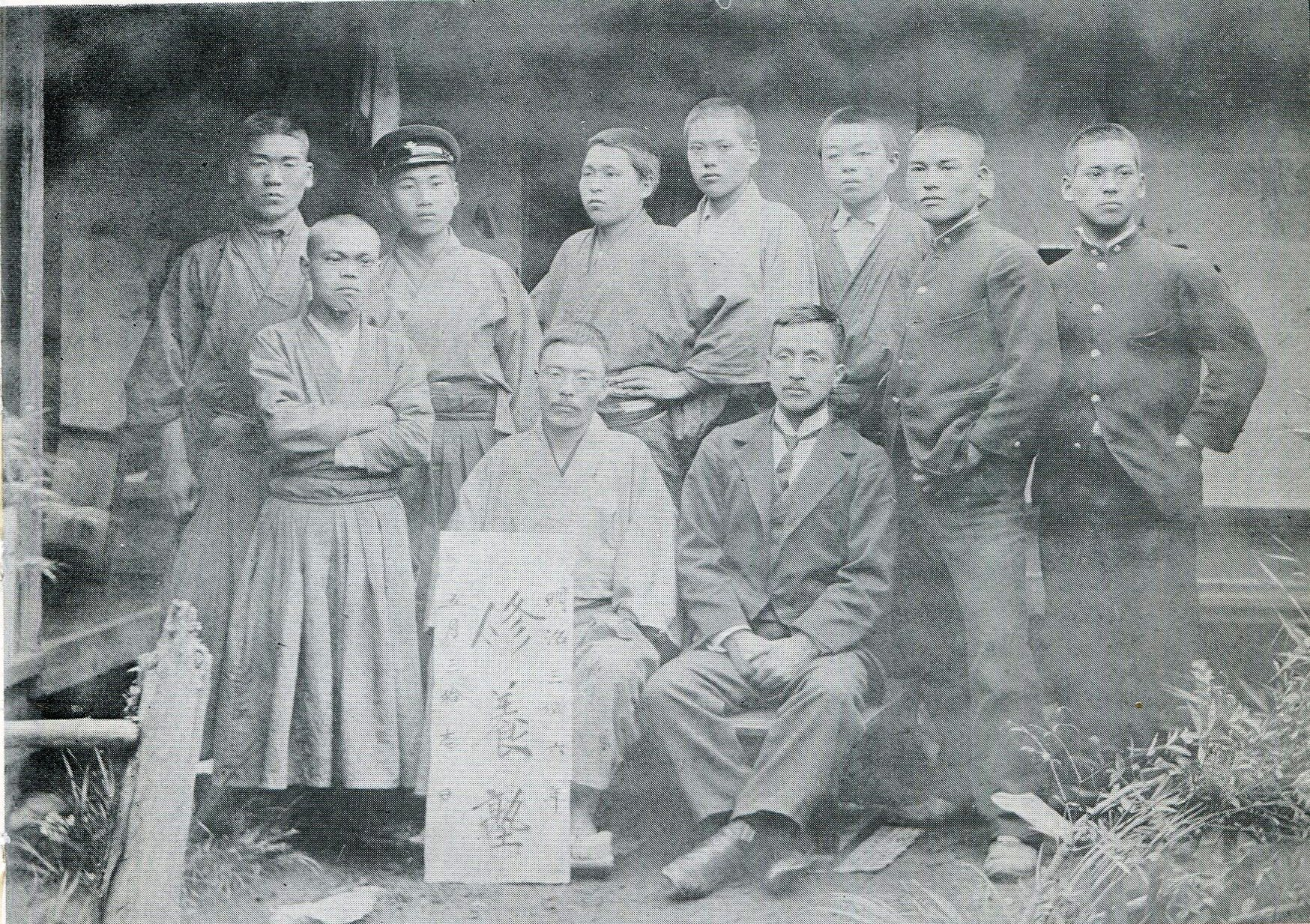
Naosaku Takahashi, age 16, is the third person from the left in the back row, his hands on his waist. Professor Kazumasa Yoshimaru in suit and tie, 30 years old, is in the front row. (Tokyo, 1903)

Naosaku Takahashi (髙橋直作 [or 高橋直作], birth name: Naosaku Yamanaka [山中直作], pen name: Shimbi Takahashi [高橋真美]) was a social worker, a novelist in his youth, and a minister (at first the Salvation Army and later the United Church of Christ in Japan).

== Early life ==
Naosaku Takahashi was born on July 25, 1886, at 1071 Sugeya in Tsuchiura City, Ibaraki Prefecture, Japan. (Tsuchiura is now an eastern suburban city in the Greater Tokyo Area.) His father was Bunzayemon Yamanaka and mother, Kon. He completed an eight-year elementary school program and an informal 3-year preparatory study in classical Chinese for secondary school. When he was 16, Takahashi journeyed to Tokyo and was accepted as a "schoolboy" of the Shuyojuku, a private boarding home for self-help working students established by Professor Kazumasa Yoshimaru (吉丸一昌)., a poet and instructor of Japanese literature at the Tokyo Music School (now Department of Music, Tokyo University of the Arts).

In 1905, Takahashi worked briefly for the newly established Tokyo Toden tramcar company, He served in the army from 1906 to 1908 joining the 2nd Infantry Regiment of the 1st Division (Imperial Japanese Army) which was garrisoned in Sakura, Chiba Prefecture. After being discharged from the military in 1909, he worked for Hakubunkan, a publishing company and concurrently attended Rinzo Yuki's (結城林蔵) lectures on photography at the Tokyo Higher Technical School (now Tokyo Institute of Technology) as a non-degree student.

== Christianity ==
On April 24, 1906, Takahashi participated in a student rally of the Salvation Army led by Gunpei Yamamuro (山室軍平) It was there that he resolved to pursue a Christian life. While working for Hakubunkan in 1909, he also volunteered as a lay member of the Kanda Squadron of the Salvation Army in Tokyo.

On April 4, 1914, Takahashi married Hide, the daughter of Mantaro Takahashi. He changed his surname from his family name, Yamanaka, to Takahashi and was registered as Mantaro's son-in-law. The first marriage ended shortly thereafter with the death of Hide. Following his wife's death, he became a full-time soldier in the Salvation Army and worked as a staff member in their publishing department. In 1918, he was accepted to the Salvation Army College for Officer Training in Tokyo and graduated in 1920 with the rank of lieutenant.

As an officer of the Salvation Army Headquarters in Tokyo, he engaged in relief activities following the 1923 Great Kanto Earthquake in September, 1923. After serving as the chief officer of Hamamatsu Squadron and then Osaka Squadron, Takahashi was appointed the commander of the Hokkaido Regiment, Sapporo, in 1928 and promoted to major. As a newly appointed commander with the rank of Major, Takahashi proposed planting trees in Hokkaido. Subsequently, Takahashi, his wife (Lt.) Yukino, and their co-workers planted 17,000 trees. In 1933, he was transferred to the Kanto Regiment in Maebashi City, Gunma Prefecture.

== Social work ==
=== As a Salvation Army Officer (minister) ===
Takahashi donated a 5,400 square-foot house located at Komagome, Tokyo, which had been bequeathed by Yoshimaru, to the United Church of Christ in Japan for their social work activities.

From the Kanto Regiment in Maebashi City, Gunma Prefecture, Takahashi was transferred to the Salvation Army Tokyo Headquarters. On August 1, 1937, he was appointed commander of the Social Work Department's Doryokukan ("Effort Hall") near Mikawashima Station, Tokyo. The Doryokukan was a vocational aid center primarily engaged in the temperance movement and helping those recovering from alcoholism. On April 25, 1945, about four months before the end of the Second World War, the facility was closed due to a forced evacuation order from the Imperial Japanese Army, and the building was dismantled by the military, interrupting Takahashi's activities in social work.

=== As a United Church of Christ in Japan minister (pastor) ===
Although Takahashi was essentially a Salvation Army officer until 1948, after the war, he was technically a pastor of the United Church of Christ in Japan. The Salvation Army had been renamed the Japan Salvation Corporation (日本救世団) in 1940 at the behest of the Imperial Army to avoid any confusion with the militarized army. The Japan Salvation Corporation participated in the United Church of Christ in Japan, which was established for the purpose of uniting the Christian churches through accreditation by the Religious Organization Law (宗教団体法) of 1940. The name Salvation Army was revived in 1948 by the Allied Occupation of Japan, but Takahashi remained a minister (pastor) of the United Church of Christ in Japan in order to continue his on-going projects in social work. He was an active pastor until January 1959, when he retired at age 72. In the month following his retirement, in discharge of his remaining obligation, he and his major patrons inspected the relocation site of "Keiairyo" in Yamato, Kanagawa Prefecture.

==== Establishment of "Meguro Koseiryo (Meguro Shelter Home)" and "Airinkai" ====
After the end of WWII, Takahashi led a rescue mission, the so-called "Karikomi" or "hunting," a playful word for "finding" those made homeless by the war. Many homeless adults and orphaned children were found camping in Ueno Park and the underpasses near Ueno Terminal Station because the area of downtown Tokyo had been destroyed in the U.S. air raids. Thousands of people had lost their homes and suffered from hunger and diseases but there were no adequate protective care facilities for them.

With the cooperation of the Welfare Division of the Tokyo Metropolitan Government Bureau, he was able to rent a part of the barracks of the Imperial 17th Army or Seventeenth Army (Japan) located in Meguro, Tokyo. Thus, on January 25, 1946, the "Meguro Koseiryo" was established as a permanent shelter for homeless adults and orphans. On October 8, 1948, Emperor Hirohito visited the Meguro Koseiryo to commend and encourage Takahashi's social work.

Takahashi took the initiative on the front line in "hunting," (i.e., the rescue mission) shortly after the establishment of the Koseiryo, and as a result, contracted typhus. He recovered from the deadly disease notwithstanding his 59 years. Koseiryo had a home for single mothers, "Boshiryo," and a dormitory for orphans, "Wakabaryo." It presently continues its social work as the non-profit corporation "Airinkai," and operates three facilities in Meguro, Tokyo: "Komabaen," "Hakujuso," and "Hikawa Home." Takahashi served as a board member of the Airinkai until his retirement at the age of 72.

==== Establishment of "Keiairyo (retirement home)" and "Keiaikai" ====
In 1949, Takayuki Namaye (生江孝之), a pioneer of modern Japanese social work and a scholar of the history of social work, planned to establish a paid-retirement home for the first time in Japan. Takahashi assisted in its planning. On May 24, 1950, Takahashi acquired the mansion of a declining baronial family at Omori Sanno, Ota-ku, Tokyo, and started moving in from August 18. Namaye, then aged 82, was its first director, with Takahashi, aged 64, as its manager. Takahashi concurrently served as the pastor of Keiairyo Chapel.

The 18,000 sq ft (1,700 m^{2}) baron's residence however gradually became overcrowded because of the limited space in the urban area. Takahashi was forced, by law, to relocate the Keiairyo to a suburban area. Finally, in 1959, he was able to purchase land in Yamato City, Kanagawa, which was four times larger than the previous premises. The new facility was inaugurated in 1960 and still exists at the same address as the non-profit corporation "Keiaikai" (Keiai no Sono). Namaye died in 1957 before the relocation, and Takahashi resigned from his post as manager and pastor at the age of 72 after the purchase of the new land in 1959.

== Personal life ==
On April 4, 1914, Takahashi married Hide, the daughter of Mantaro Takahashi, and changed his surname from Yamanaka to Takahashi. Although his wife Hide died soon after marriage, he continued to call himself "Takahashi" for the rest of his life. The tragedy of his wife's death was the motivation for his dedication to the Salvation Army.

In 1918 Takahashi married his Salvation Army colleague, Yukino (father: Wajiro Mizushina, mother: Yuki). She was from Aoki, Ueda, Nagano. They had four sons and five daughters. Among the children, the eldest son and the fifth daughter helped Takahashi's social work after their completing graduate study at the one-year graduate course of the Japan College of Social Work. His second son and his fourth daughter worked for Takahashi's social work projects on a part-time basis. The second son assisted as a medical doctor (M.D. and Ph.D. from the Tokyo Medical and Dental University); he later became the director of the Department of Surgery, Tokyo Metropolitan Komagome Hospital, 東京都立駒込病院. The fourth daughter helped as a licensed nutritionist (B.S. from the Jissen Women's University, 実践女子大学).

Takahashi spent most of the rest of his life in Niiza, Saitama with his wife, Yukino. At the age of 72, he resigned as minister of the United Church of Christ in Japan, but continued his involvement in various social work programs as a Christian. He died on January 22, 1976, at the age of 89 in Matsuyama City, Ehime Prefecture.

== Major works ==
Takahashi wrote several books under the pen name, Shimbi Takahashi:

- Shimbi Takahashi "Kanashimi no Uchiyori (A Novel: From the Abyss of Grief)" Tokyo: Keiseisha, 1918 小説 高橋真美『悲しみの裡より』（東京：警醒社、1918年）
- Naosaku Takahashi "Shikan no Kenko Mondai (Health Problems among Officers)" in Kyuseigun Shikan Zasshi 22(1933): 282-287 論文 高橋直作「士官の健康問題」『救世軍士官雑誌』22巻（1933年）：p. 282－287（東京：救世軍出版及供給部刊）
- Shimbi Takahashi "Kanashimi no Uchiyori (From the Abyss of Grief): Revised and Enlarged" Tokyo: Taishindo, 1971 小説 高橋真美『改訂・増補 悲しみの裡より』（東京：待晨堂、1971年）
- Shimbi Takahashi "Watashi no Shinyaku: Hachijyu-Hachinen no Shogai ([Autobiography] My New Testament: Eighty-eight Years of My Life)" Tokyo: Isamu Takahashi (private edition), 1973 自伝 高橋真美『私の新約 八十八年の生涯』（東京：髙橋勇 私家版、1973年）

== See also ==
- Social work
- Christianity
- Salvation Army
- United Church of Christ in Japan
