= Tsuchiura Domain =

Tsuchiura Domain 土浦藩
- under Tokugawa shogunate Japan
- 1600–1871
- Capital: Tsuchiura Castle
  - Type: Daimyō
- Historical era: Edo period
  - Established: 1600
  - Disestablished: 1871
- Today part of: part of Ibaraki Prefecture

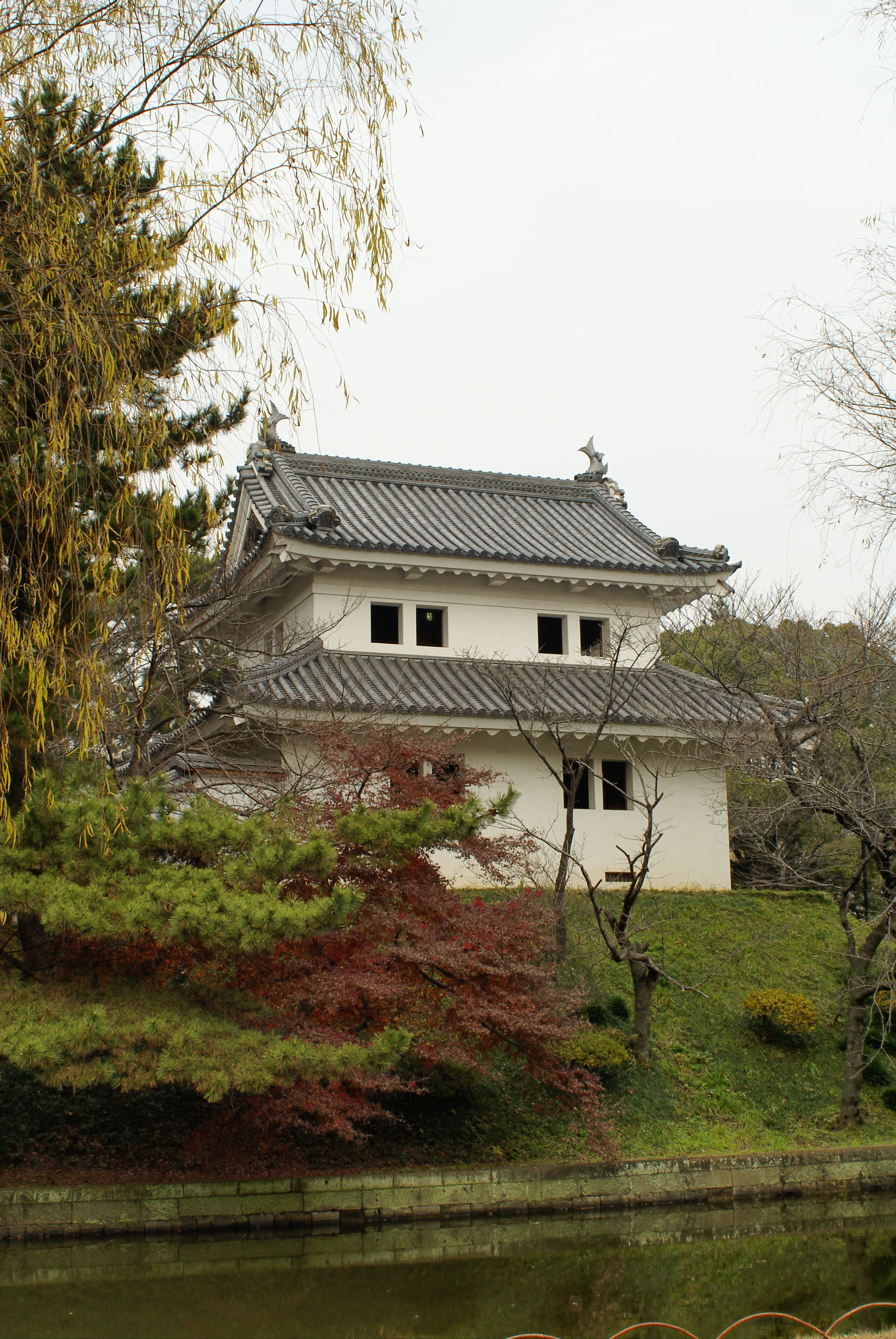
Higashi-Yagura of Tsuchiura Castle, administrative center of Tsuchiura Domain

Tsuchiura Domain (土浦藩, Tsuchiura-han) was a feudal domain under the Tokugawa shogunate of Edo period Japan, located in Hitachi Province (modern-day Ibaraki Prefecture), Japan. It was centered on Tsuchiura Castle in what is now the city of Tsuchiura, Ibaraki. It was ruled for much of its history by the Tsuchiya clan.

== History ==
During the Sengoku period, the area around Tsuchiura was controlled by the Oda clan, who were later destroyed by the Yūki clan. After the Battle of Sekigahara, and the establishment of the Tokugawa shogunate, the Yūki were relocated to Fukui Domain in Echizen Province and a portion of their vacated domain was given to Matsudaira Nobukazu as a reward for his rear-guard action in the Battle of Sekigahara. His son, Matsudaira Nobuyoshi, laid out the foundations of the castle town and built a number of gates on the Mito Kaidō highway linking Edo with Mito.

However, the Matsudaira were transferred to Takasaki Domain in Kōzuke Province and were replaced by Nishio Tadanaga, who received Tsuchiura as a reward of his services in the Siege of Osaka. His son, Nishio Tadateru, was transferred to Tanaka Domain in Suruga Province.

In 1649, Kutsuki Tanetsuna became daimyō, and was followed by his son Kutsuki Tanemasa until the clan was transferred to Fukuchiyama Domain in Tanba Province.

Tsuchiya Kazunao, a wakadoshiyori under Tokugawa Iemitsu received Tsuchiura next. He later became a rōjū. He was followed by his son, Tsuchiya Masanao, who was subsequently transferred to Tanaka Domain in Suruga Province. The domain was then awarded to Matsudaira Nobuoki, the 5th son of Matsudaira Nobutsuna, who held the post for only five years before being appointed Osaka-jō dai.

Tsuchiura was then returned to Tsuchiya Kazunao, who had served as rōjū during the tenure of four shōguns, during which time his revenues had increased to 95,000koku. The Tsuchiya ruled Tsuchiura for the next ten generations until the Meiji Restoration. The final daimyō, Tsuchiya Shigenao, was adopted into the clan from the Mito Tokugawa clan, and was a younger brother of the last shōgun, Tokugawa Yoshinobu.

The domain had a total population of 12933 people in 2918 households per a census in 1741; however, in a census of 1834, the castle town of Shimodate had a population of only 1637 people in 364 households.

== Holdings at the end of the Edo period ==
As with most domains in the han system, Tsuchiura Domain consisted of several discontinuous territories calculated to provide the assigned kokudaka, based on periodic cadastral surveys and projected agricultural yields. This was especially the case with Tsuchiura Domain, whose holdings were scattered in many locations.

- Hitachi Province
  - 8 villages in Ibaraki District
  - 47 villages in Niihari District
  - 8 villages in Shida District
  - 53 villages in Tsukuba District
- Dewa Province
  - 18 villages in Murayama District
- Mutsu Province (Iwaki Province)
  - 10 villages in Ishikawa District
- Mutsu Province (Iwashiro Province)
  - 2villages in Iwase District
- Shimōsa Province
  - 6 villages in Soma District
- Izumi Province
  - 11 villages in Hine District
- Mimasaka Province
  - 3 villages in Yoshino District
  - 16 villages in Shoboku District

== List of daimyōs ==
#	Name	Tenure	Courtesy title	Court Rank	kokudaka
Fukui-Matsudaira clan (fudai) 1604–1617
1	Matsudaira Nobukazu (松平信一)	1600–1604	Izu-no-kami (伊豆守)	Lower 4th (従四位下)	35,000 koku
2	Matsudaira Nobuyoshi (松平信吉)	1604–1617	Izu-no-kami (伊豆守)	Lower 5th (従五位下)	35,000 koku
Nishio clan (fudai) 1618–1649
1	Nishio Tadanaga (西尾忠永)	1618–1620	Tango-no-kami (丹後守)	Lower 5th (従五位下)	20,000 koku
2	Nishio Tadateru (西尾忠照)	1620–1649	Tango-no-kami (丹後守)	Lower 5th (従五位下)	20,000 koku
Kutsuki clan (fudai) 1649–1669
1	Kutsuki Tanetsuna (朽木稙綱)	1649–1660	Minbu-no-sho (民部少輔)	Lower 5th (従五位下)	30,000 koku
2	Kutsuki Tanemasa (朽木稙昌)	1661–1669	Iyo-no-kami (伊予守)	Lower 5th (従五位下)	30,000 koku
Tsuchiya clan (fudai) 1669–1682
1	Tsuchiya Kazunao (土屋数直)	1669–1679	Tajima-no-kami (但馬守); Jiju (侍従)	Lower 4th (従四位下)	45,000 koku
2	Tsuchiya Masanao (土屋政直)	1679–1682	Sagami-no-kami (相模守); Jiju (侍従)	Lower 4th (従四位下)	45,000 koku
Ōkōchi-Matsudaira clan (fudai) 1682–1687
1	Matsudaira Nobuoki (松平信興)	1682–1687	Mimasaka-no-kami (美濃守)	Lower 5th (従五位下)	53,000 koku
Tsuchiya clan (fudai) 1687–1871
1	Tsuchiya Masanao (土屋政直)	1687–1719	Sagami-no-kami (相模守); Jiju (侍従)	Lower 4th (従四位下)	65,000→95,000 koku
2	Tsuchiya Nobunao (土屋陳直)	1719–1734	Tajima-no-kami (但馬守)	Lower 5th (従五位下)	95,000 koku
3	Tsuchiya Atsunao (土屋篤直)	1734–1776	Noto-no-kami (能登守)	Lower 5th (従五位下)	95,000 koku
4	Tsuchiya Hisanao (土屋寿直)	1776–1777	Sagami-no-kami (相模守)	Lower 5th (従五位下)	95,000 koku
5	Tsuchiya Yasunao (土屋泰直)	1777–1790	Noto-no-kami (能登守)	Lower 5th (従五位下)	95,000 koku
6	Tsuchiya Hidenao (土屋英直)	1790–1803	Tajima-no-kami (但馬守)	Lower 5th (従五位下)	95,000 koku
7	Tsuchiya Hironao (土屋寛直)	1803–1811	-none-	-none-	95,000 koku
8	Tsuchiya Yoshinao (土屋彦直)	1811–1838	Sagami-no-kami (相模守)	Upper 5th (従五位上)	95,000 koku
9	Tsuchiya Tomonao (土屋寅直)	1838–1868	Wakasa-no-kami (采女正)	Lower 4th (従四位下)	95,000 koku
10	Tsuchiya Shigenao (土屋挙直)	1868–1871	Sagami-no-kami (相模守)	Lower 5th (従五位下)	95,000 koku
