= Tsuchiura Castle =

Tsuchiura Castle 土浦城
- Tsuchiura, Ibaraki Prefecture, Japan
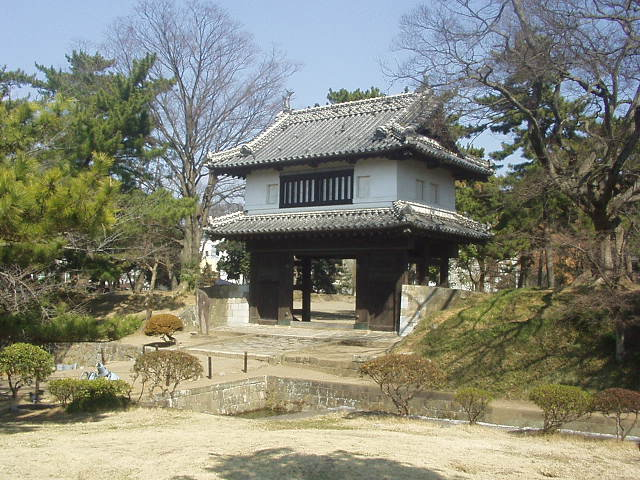
- Taiko Yagura Gate of Tsuchiura Castle

Site information
- Type: flatland-style Japanese castle
- Open to the public: yes

Location
- Coordinates: 36°5′6.37″N 140°11′53.33″E

Site history
- In use: Edo period
- Demolished: 1873

Tsuchiura Castle (土浦城, Tsuchiura-jō) is a flatland-style Japanese castle located in Tsuchiura, southern Ibaraki Prefecture, Japan. At the end of the Edo period, Tsuchiura Castle was home to the Tsuchiya clan, daimyō of Tsuchiura Domain. The castle was also known as "Ki-jō" (亀城, Turtle Castle).

== History ==
The early history of Tsuchiura Castle is not clear, and per folklore the original castle was founded in the Heian period by Taira no Masakado. During the Sengoku period, the area around Tsuchiura was controlled by the Oda clan, who were later destroyed by the Yūki clan. After the Battle of Sekigahara, and the establishment of the Tokugawa shogunate, the Yūki were relocated to Fukui Domain in Echizen Province and a portion of their vacated domain was given to Matsudaira Nobukazu as a reward for his rear-guard action in the Battle of Sekigahara. His son, Matsudaira Nobuyoshi, laid out the foundations of the castle town and built a number of gates on the Mito Kaidō highway linking Edo with Mito.

During the early Edo period, the castle passed through a number of hands until it came under the control of the Tsuchiya clan in 1669. The Tsuchiya ruled until the Meiji restoration, except for one hiatus of five years.

After the Meiji Restoration, per government order, the fortifications of the castle were dismantled and most of its moats were filled in. The central bailey with the ex-daimyo palace was used as a government office until it burned down in 1884. A new office building was completed; however, in 1899 the central bailey and second bailey were donated to the city and became Kijo Park. Only one yagura remains from the Edo period, the Taiko Yagura Mon, which was built in 1656. The remaining two yagura are both reconstructions from the 1990s, one of which, the East Yagura, is used as the Tsuchiura City Museum.

== Literature ==
- De Lange, William (2021). An Encyclopedia of Japanese Castles. Groningen: Toyo Press. pp. 600 pages. ISBN 978-9492722300.
- Schmorleitz, Morton S. (1974). Castles in Japan. Tokyo: Charles E. Tuttle Co. pp. 144–145. ISBN 0-8048-1102-4.
- Motoo, Hinago (1986). Japanese Castles. Tokyo: Kodansha. p. 200 pages. ISBN 0-87011-766-1.
- Mitchelhill, Jennifer (2004). Castles of the Samurai: Power and Beauty. Tokyo: Kodansha. p. 112 pages. ISBN 4-7700-2954-3.
- Turnbull, Stephen (2003). Japanese Castles 1540-1640. Osprey Publishing. p. 64 pages. ISBN 1-84176-429-9.
