= Koito River =

Coordinates: 35°21′4″N 139°51′21″E

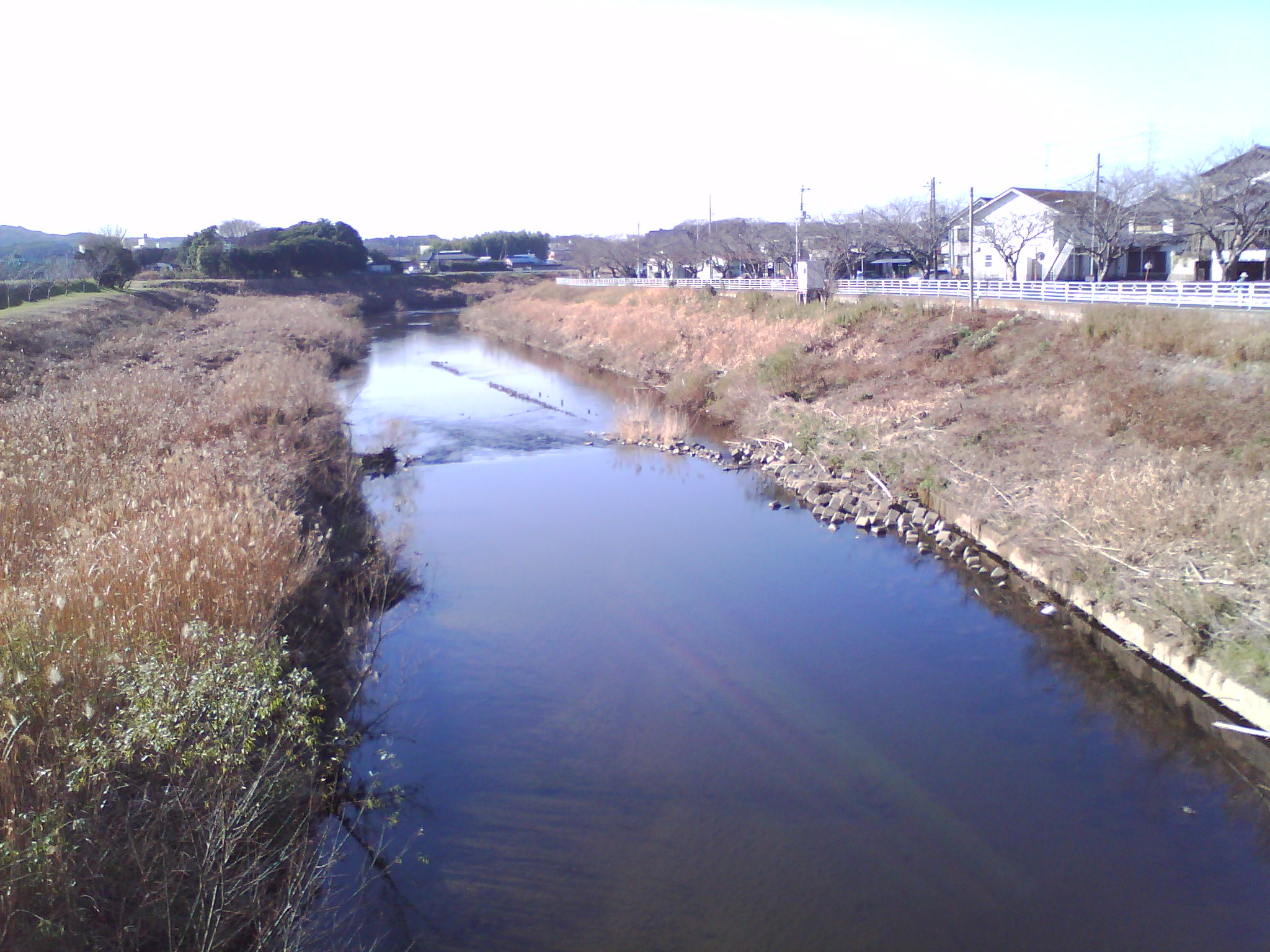
- Koito River in winter, Kimitsu, Chiba

- Native name: 小糸川 (Japanese)

Location
- Country: Japan

Physical characteristics
- Source
  - location: Mount Kiyosumi, Kimitsu
- Mouth
  - location: Tokyo Bay, Kimitsu
  - elevation: 0 m (0 ft)
- Length: 82 km (51 mi)
- Basin size: 148.7 km^{2} (57.4 sq mi)

The Koito River (小糸川, Koito-gawa) is a river in Futtsu and Kimitsu, Chiba Prefecture, Japan. The river is 82 kilometers (51 mi) in length and has a drainage area of 148.7 square kilometers (57.4 sq mi). The Koito is the third-longest river in Chiba Prefecture, and under the Rivers Act of 1906 the Koito is designated as a Class 2 River. The name of the river in Japanese is a combination of two kanji characters, the first meaning “little”, and the second meaning “thread”.

== Geography ==
The Koito River originates from a deep valley in forests around Mount Kiyosumi in the Bōsō Hill Range. The river cuts through the Kazusa Hill Range, a smaller part of the Bōsō Hill Range, and in its upper part, meanders northwest. The Koito creates picturesque ravines throughout the Bōsō Hill Range, and passes by Mount Karasuba and Mount Kiyosumi. The middle and lower parts of the Koito feature fluvial terraces. Extensive land reclamation was carried out near the mouth of the river, and this land was used to build the Nippon Steel Kimitsu Works. The Kimitsu Works sits on the north bank of the Koito River where it empties in Tokyo Bay.

The Koito River has numerous narrow points along its course, and flooding has been a frequent problem. In the middle part of the river there were floods in 1996 and 2006. The Mishima Dam was built on the Koito due to prevent drought on the upper and middle parts of the river, and the Toyofusa Dam was built on the upper part of the river to prevent water shortages and supply water for industrial purposes.

== Origin of name ==
In the third chapter of the Gikeiki, which dates to the 14th century, the Koito River is called the "Sue River". In Kubo Tadayasu's Edo period illustrations of Kazusa Province domains in 1699 the river appears as the "Susu River", or possibly the "Sue River", of Sutō District; in its lower reaches it appears with its present-day name as the Koito River in Susai District. The current name of the river, however, appears in one work as early as 1662, and in the 'Nakatomi kyōdoshi' in 1674.

== Tributaries ==
=== Upper ===
- Sanma River
- Shin'niyo River
- Manami River

=== Lower ===
- Egawa River
- Miyanoshita River

== History ==
The earliest settlements in the southern part of Chiba Prefecture were via the numerous small rivers on the Bōsō Peninsula. The Koito River is associated with the Dairizuka Kofun Group in Futtsu, which was active from the 5th to 7th century. The group exhibits not only at least 47 kofun but also excellent examples of haniwa funerary objects. The area around the mouth of the Koito River is the historical center of Chiba Prefecture's nori seaweed industry.

== Recreation ==
- Koito River Onsen -- onsen hot spring, Nittone District, Kimitsu
- In the upper parts of the Koito River have been designated as the Seiwa Prefectural Forest. Camping and hiking facilities have been built, as well as an artificial lake for fishing.
