= Joyce Ackroyd =

Australian scholar of Japanese language and literature

Joyce Ackroyd OBE FAHA 宝冠章
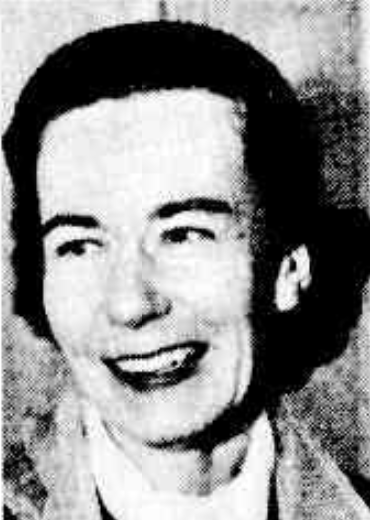
- Dr Joyce Ackroyd, 1954.png
- Born: 23 November 1918; Newcastle, New South Wales, Australia
- Died: 30 August 1991 (aged 72); Auchenflower, Queensland, Australia
- Monuments: A building at The University of Queensland
- Education: PhD, Japanese and Japanese Studies, Cambridge University, 1951
- Occupation: Academic

Joyce Irene Ackroyd, OBE FAHA 宝冠章 (23 November 1918 – 30 August 1991) was an Australian academic, translator, author and editor. She was a scholar of Japanese language and literature.

== Early life ==
Ackroyd apparently acquired an interest in Japan during her childhood, but she was not permitted to study Japanese at the University of Sydney on a teacher's scholarship in 1936 because there was insufficient demand for Japanese in secondary schools. She graduated with honours in English and history and a major in mathematics (BA, 1940; DipEd, 1941). Ackroyd studied Japanese part-time at the University of Sydney while teaching mathematics at a Sydney boys' school. In 1944 she began teaching Japanese at the Royal Australian Air Force language school in Sydney. She lectured in Japanese at the University of Sydney from 1944 to 1947, and then went to the University of Cambridge, where she was awarded a PhD in Japanese Studies in 1951. Her doctoral thesis investigated the political career and writings of the Edo period Confucianist Arai Hakuseki.

== Career ==
Ackroyd was a member of the faculty of the Australian National University in Canberra until the mid-1960s.

Ackroyd moved to Brisbane in 1965, when she was appointed the foundation professor of the new Department of Japanese Language and Literature. She helped to develop the University of Queensland's School of Japanese during the 1970s and 1980s. She was influential in building the program into one of Australia's main centres for Japanese studies.

In 1969, she showed prescience when she introduced a course in standard Chinese, which was not then considered a priority language at Australian universities.

Ackroyd's studies of Hakuseki culminated in her translations of Oritaku Shiba no Ki, published in 1980 as Told Round a Brushwood Fire: The Autobiography of Arai Hakuseki, and the Tokushi Yoron, published as Lessons from History : the Tokushi yoron in 1982.

Ackroyd was awarded the Order of the British Empire, Officer (Civil) in 1982. The following year, she was awarded the Yamagata Bantō prize by the prefectural government of Osaka for her outstanding contributions to introducing Japanese culture abroad. The Japanese government awarded her Order of the Precious Crown, Third Class. She retired in 1983.

== Legacy ==
Ackroyd became the first woman to have her name attached to a building at the University of Queensland, in 1990.

Ackroyd died on 30 August 1991. She was survived by her husband, Frank Warren (John) Speed.

== Selected works ==
In a statistical overview derived from writings by and about Joyce Ackroyd, OCLC/WorldCat encompasses roughly 20+ works in 40+ publications in three languages and 500+ library holdings.

- The Unknown Japanese (1968)
- Japan Today (1970)
- Discovering Japan: a Text-book of Japanese language for Secondary Schools (1971)
- Told Round a Brushwood Fire: the Autobiography of Arai Hakuseki by Hakuseki Arai (1979), translated by Ackroyd
- Lessons from History: the Tokushi yoron by Hakuseki Arai (1982), translated by Ackroyd
- Indecent Exposure in Japanese Literature (1982)

== Honours ==
- Officer of the Order of the British Empire
- Order of the Precious Crown
- Australian Academy of the Humanities, 1983
