= Tsukuba International University =

Coordinates: 36°6′24.3″N 140°11′56.5″E

- つくば国際大学
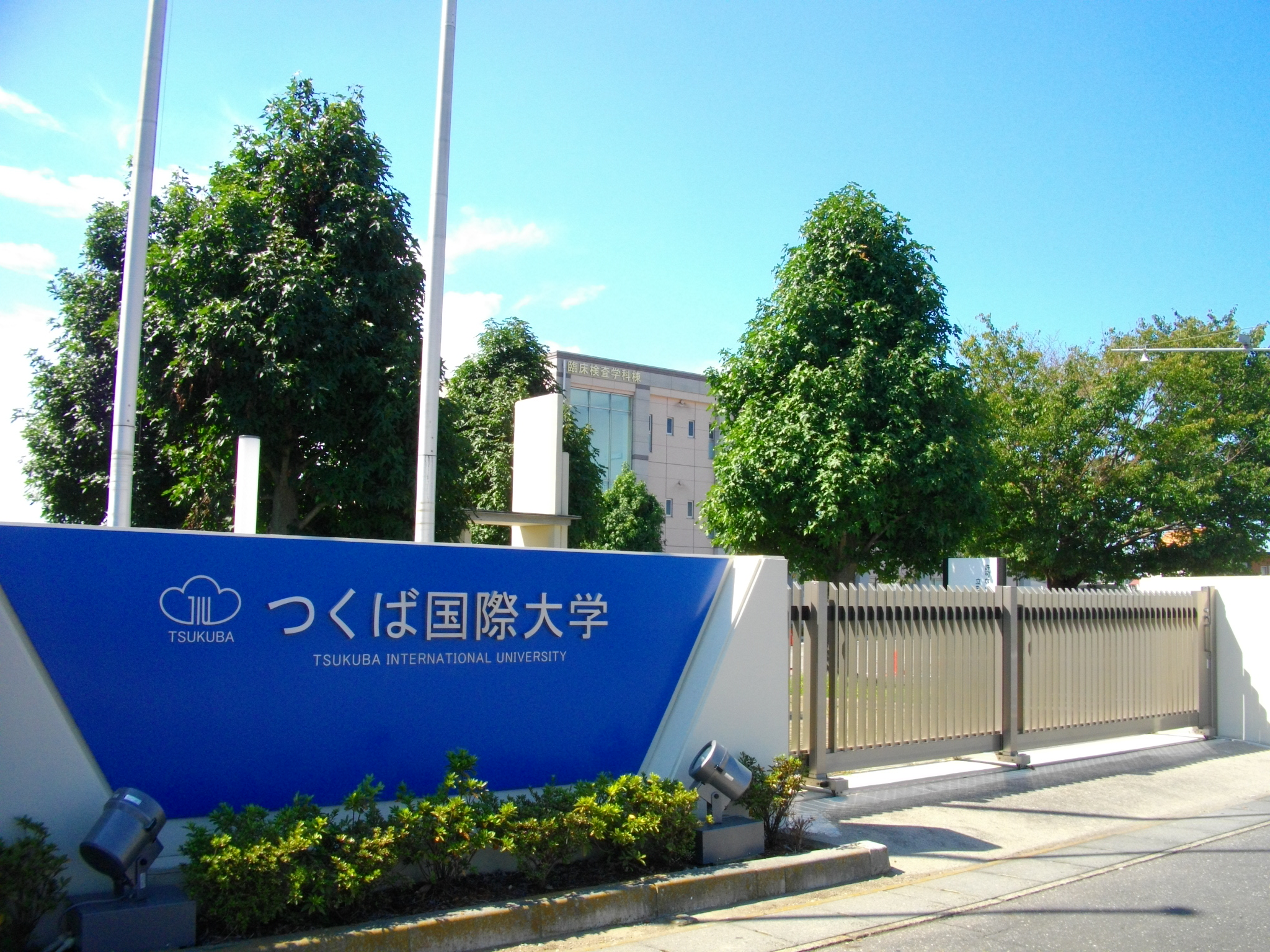
- Type: Private
- Established: 1994 (Founded in 1946)
- Location: Tsuchiura, Ibaraki, Japan
- Website: Official website

Tsukuba International University (つくば国際大学, Tsukuba kokusai daigaku) is a private university in Tsuchiura, Ibaraki Prefecture, Japan, established in 1994. The predecessor of the school was founded in 1946.

The affiliated Tsukuba International Junior College (つくば国際短期大学, Tsukuba Kokusai Tanki Daigaku) was established in 1966.
