= Seiyō Kibun =

The Seiyō Kibun (西洋紀聞) is a 3-volume study of the Occident by Japanese politician and scholar Arai Hakuseki based on conversations with Italian missionary Giovanni Battista Sidotti. The first volume is a collection of conversations with Sidotti. The second volume is a study of "the five continents" (Africa, Asia, Australia, Europe and the Americas). The third volume contains an overview of Roman Catholicism which includes some of Hakuseki's critical notes on Christianity, as well as a few comparisons he makes between Christianity and Buddhism. It was written in or around 1713, and published in 1882.

Translation of a key dialogue in the work can be found in Jason Josephson, The Invention of Religion in Japan, Appendix 1, p. 263-264.
