= Kururi Domain =

Kururi Domain 久留里藩
- under Tokugawa shogunate Japan
- 1590–1871
- Capital: Kururi Castle
  - Type: Daimyō
- Historical era: Edo period
  - Established: 1590
  - Disestablished: 1871
- Today part of: part of Chiba Prefecture

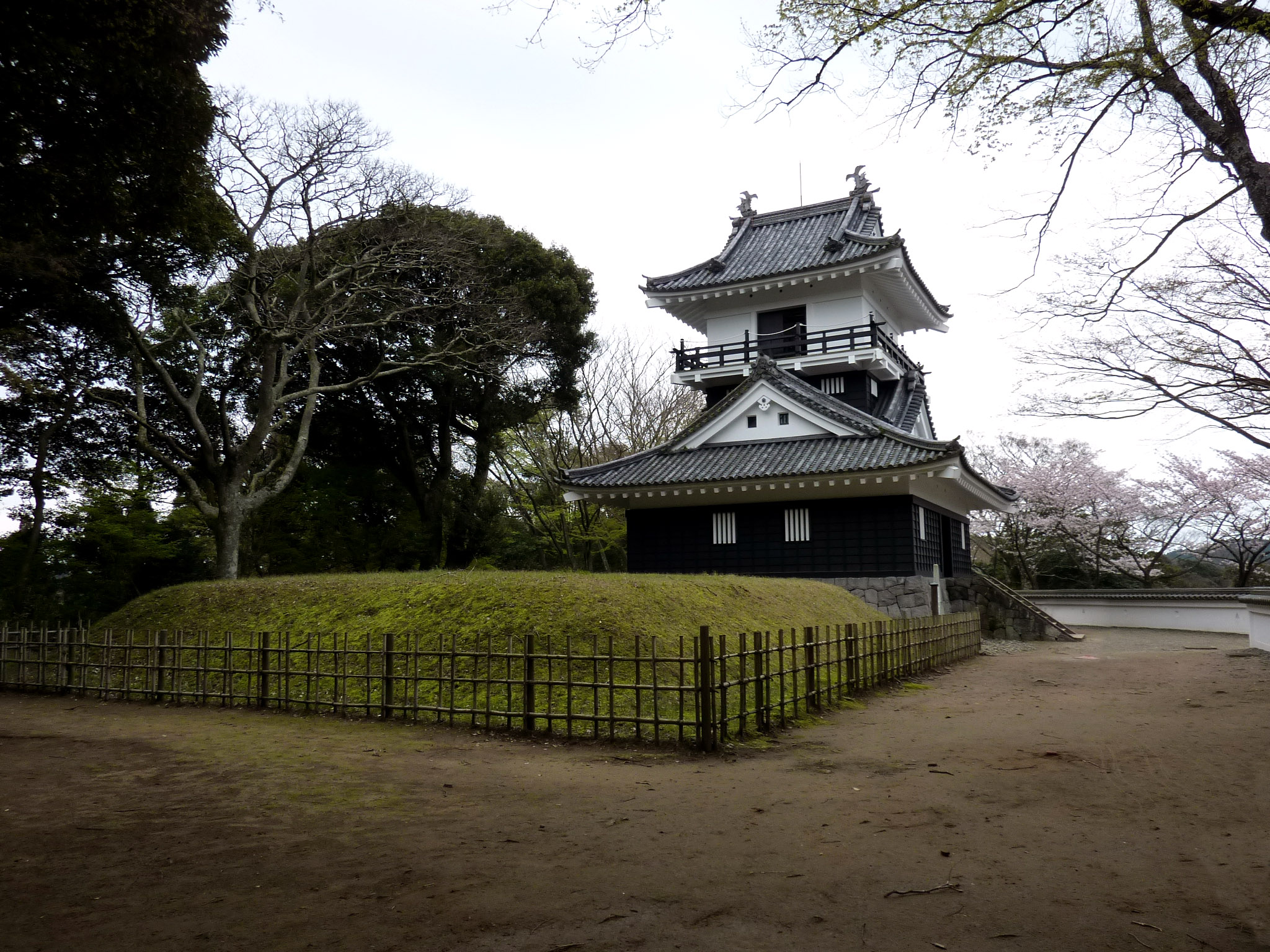
Reconstructed keep of Kururi Castle, administrative center of Kururi Domain

Kururi Domain (久留里藩, Kururi-han) was a feudal domain under the Tokugawa shogunate of Edo period Japan, located in Kazusa Province (modern-day central Chiba Prefecture), Japan. It was centered on Kururi Castle in what is now the city of Kimitsu, Chiba.

== History ==
The original Kururi Castle was a mountain-top fortification built during the Muromachi period by Takeda Nobunaga (1401–1477), and was ruled by his descendants, the Mariya clan, from 1540. With the expansion of the Satomi clan from Awa Province in the Sengoku period, the castle was taken over by Satomi Yoshitaka, who used it as his base of operations against the Hōjō clan, based at Odawara Castle. The Hōjō attempted to take Kururi unsuccessfully on a few occasions, and finally seized it in 1564. They lost it just three years later in 1567, when the Satomi regained control.

Following the Battle of Odawara, Toyotomi Hideyoshi punished the Satomi clan for their indifferent support of his campaigns by depriving them of their territories in Kazusa Province. With the entry of Tokugawa Ieyasu into the Kantō region, he assigned the fortifications at Kururi to one of his retainers, Matsudaira (Osuga) Tadamasa, the son of one of his Four Generals, Sakakibara Yasumasa, and appointed him as daimyō of the newly created 30,000 koku Kururi Domain.

Osuga Tadamasa built most of the current fortifications of Kururi Castle, and established a castle town at its base. Following the Battle of Sekigahara, the Osuga clan was transferred to Yokosuka Castle in Suruga Province, and were replaced by the Tsuchiya clan with a reduction in revenues to 20,000 koku from 1601-1679. The domain was suppressed in 1679 when Tsuchiya Naoki was declared unfit to rule due to insanity, and his son was demoted to a 3000 koku hatamoto.

Kururi was administered as tenryō territory directly under the control of the Tokugawa shogunate until 1742. In July 1742, Kuroda Naozumi, daimyō of Numata Domain in Kozuke Province was transferred to Kururi, and the han was revived. His descendants continued to rule Kururi until the Meiji Restoration. The final daimyo of Kururi Domain, Kuroda Naotaka, initially served as a guard for the pro-Tokugawa forces at the Battle of Ueno in the Boshin War, but then changed his allegiance to the new Meiji government two months later. He was appointed domain governor under the new administration, until the abolition of the han system in July 1871. Kururi Domain became “Kururi Prefecture”, which merged with the short lived “Kisarazu Prefecture” in November 1871, later becoming part of Chiba Prefecture.

The domain had a population of 1189 samurai in 253 households, 143 ashigaru in 74 households, and 20,766 commoners in 4465 households per an 1869 census. The domain maintained its primary residence (kamiyashiki) in Edo at Hiro-koji, in Shitaya.

== Holdings at the end of the Edo period ==
As with most domains in the han system, Kururi Domain consisted of several discontinuous territories calculated to provide the assigned kokudaka, based on cadastral surveys and projected agricultural yields. In the case of Kururi Domain, these territories were scattered over a wide area of Musashi Province and Kazusa Province.

- Musashi Province
  - 7 villages in Saitama District
  - 4 villages in Hiki District
  - 1 village in Koma District
  - 2 villages in Irima District
  - 4 villages in Hiki District
  - 2 villages in Kodama District
  - 6 villages in Kami District
  - 4 villages in Hara District
- Kazusa Province
  - 39 villages in Mouda District
  - 27 villages in Ichihara District
  - 1 village in Kamihabu District

== List of daimyō ==
#	Name	Tenure	Courtesy title	Court Rank	kokudaka
Osuga clan (fudai) 1590-1601
1	Osuga Tadamasa (大須賀 忠政)	1590–1601	Dewa-no-kami (出羽守)	Lower 5th (従五位下)	30,000 koku
Tsuchiya clan (fudai) 1602-1679
1	Tsuchiya Tadanao (土屋 忠直)	1602–1612	Mibu-no-sho (民部少輔)	Lower 5th (従五位下)	20,000 koku
2	Tsuchiya Toshinao (土屋 利直)	1612–1675	Mibu-no-sho (民部少輔)	Lower 5th (従五位下)	20,000 koku
3	Tsuchiya Naoki (土屋 直樹)	1675–1679	Iyo-no-kami (伊予守)	Lower 5th (従五位下)	20,000 koku
Kuroda clan (fudai) 1742-1871
1	Kuroda Naozumi (黒田 直純)	1742–1775	Yamato-no-kami (大和守)	Lower 5th (従五位下)	30,000 koku
2	Kuroda Naoyuki (黒田 直亨)	1775–1784	Buzen-no-kami (豊前守)	Lower 5th (従五位下)	30,000 koku
3	Kuroda Naohide (黒田 直英)	1784–1786	Izumi-no-kami (和泉守)	Lower 5th (従五位下)	30,000 koku
4	Kuroda Naoatsu (黒田 直温)	1786–1801	Yamato-no-kami (大和守)	Lower 5th (従五位下)	30,000 koku
5	Kuroda Naokata (黒田 直方)	1801–1812	Buzen-no-kami (豊前守)	Lower 5th (従五位下)	30,000 koku
6	Kuroda Naoyoshi (黒田 直侯)	1812–1823	Buzen-no-kami (豊前守)	Lower 5th (従五位下)	30,000 koku
7	Kuroda Naochika (黒田 直静)	1823–1854	Buzen-no-kami (豊前守)	Lower 5th (従五位下)	30,000 koku
8	Kuroda Naoyasu (黒田 直和)	1854–1860	Ise-no-kami (伊勢守)	Lower 5th (従五位下)	30,000 koku
9	Kuroda Naotaka (黒田 直養)	1860–1871	Chikugo-no-kami (筑後守)	Lower 5th (従五位下)	30,000 koku
