= Sairan Igen =

The Sairan Igen (采覧異言) is a five-volume geography established in 1713 then revised in 1725 by the Japanese Confucian philosopher, government official, and poet Arai Hakuseki. It was an early and influential work of world geography in Japan, widely circulated there by manuscripts. Based on knowledge that Hakuseki gained through conversations with missionary Giovanni Battista Sidotti and referencing such works as Matteo Ricci's Kunyu Wanguo Quantu (lit. 'A Map of the Myriad Countries of the World'), the books describe the geography, history, customs, and biological organisms of the world as known during Hakuseki's day.
