= Giovanni Battista Sidotti =

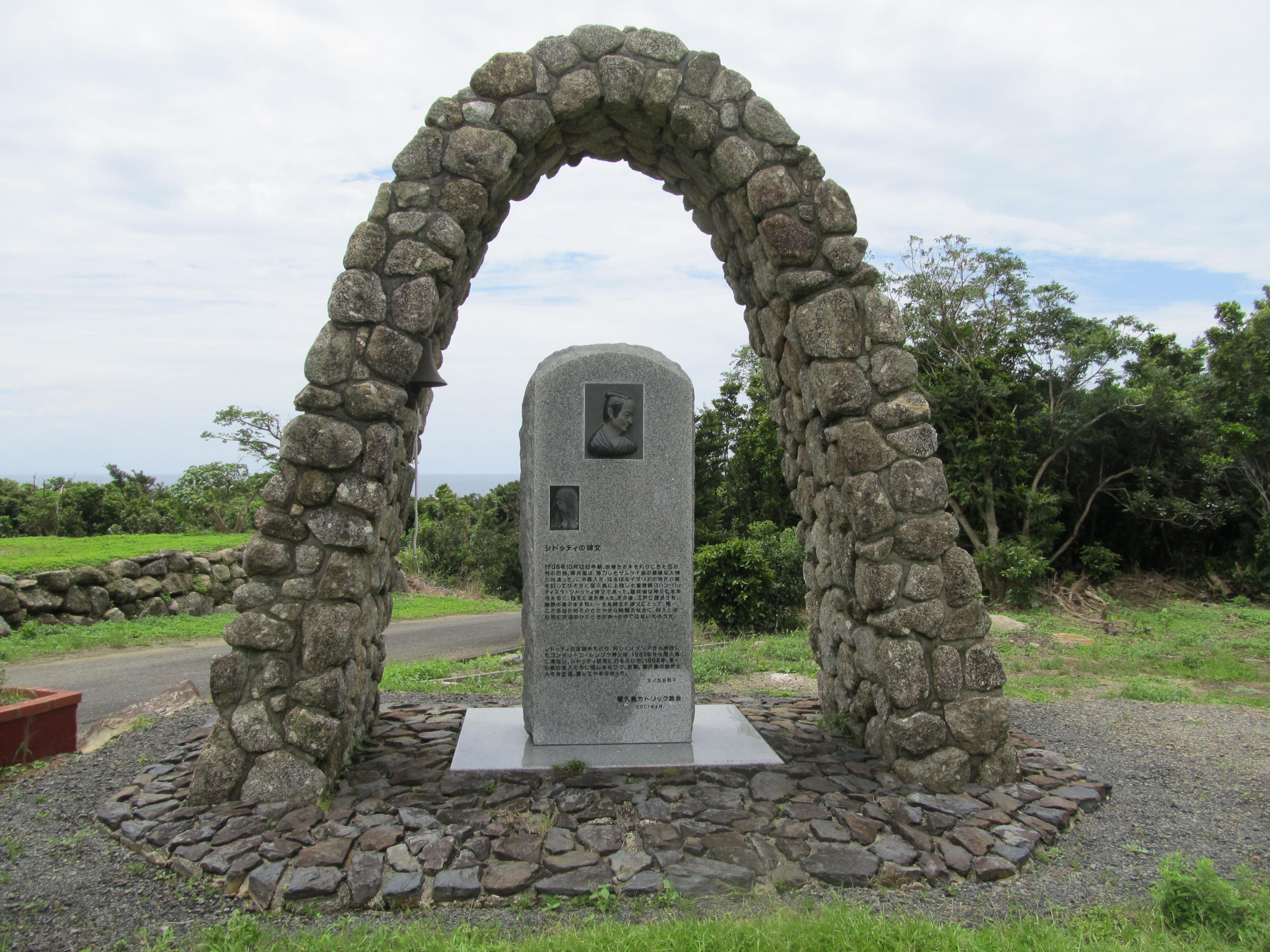
Monument to Sidotti in Yakushima, Japan

Giovanni Battista Sidotti (22 August 1667 – 27 November 1714) was an Italian secular priest and Apostolic Missionary of the Pontifical Congregation of Propaganda Fide. During the Edo period, he entered Japan illegally and was arrested, whereupon he was confined until his death.

The Japanese politician and scholar Arai Hakuseki published the Seiyō Kibun (‘Reports from the West’) based on his conversations with Sidotti.

== Life ==
Sidotti was born in Sicily, Italy, in 1667. Little is known of his early life. While working as a priest, he heard stories of missionary martyrdom in Japan, and he decided to go there, which, under Japanese law, was illegal at the time. After gaining permission from Pope Clement XI to go to Japan, he made his way as far as Manila, but he couldn't find a ship willing to deliver a missionary to Japan, which had closed itself off from the world under the sakoku policy.

Finally, he managed to find a ship willing to take him on board, and in September or October 1708, he landed on Yakushima. He was disguised as a samurai, but immediately stood out as a Westerner and he was arrested and taken to Nagasaki soon thereafter.

The next year, in 1709, he was taken to Edo and questioned directly by Japanese politician and Confucian scholar Arai Hakuseki. Hakuseki was impressed by Sidotti's demeanor and his level of scholarship, and developed a great deal of respect for him. The feeling was mutual, and Sidotti grew to trust Arai. Here, for the first time since the beginning of sakoku in the previous century, was a meeting between two great scholars from the civilizations of Japan and western Europe. Among other things, Sidotti told Hakuseki that, contrary to what the Japanese believed at that time, Western missionaries were not the vanguards of Western armies.

Therefore, rejecting the common wisdom that it was best to torture Christians until they had abandoned their beliefs, Arai advised his superiors to follow three possible courses of action in dealing with foreigners. Optimally, they should be deported. If this was not possible, they should be imprisoned. Execution should be a last resort.

Hakuseki's recommendation of deportation was completely unprecedented. In the end, the government decided to jail Sidotti, sending him to the Kirishitan Yashiki (キリシタン屋敷, Christian Mansion) in Myōgadani (Present-day Kohinata, Bunkyō-ku, Tōkyō). The mansion was built in 1646 to house arrested missionaries, but due both to sakoku and a ban on religious indoctrination, between the time the mansion was built and Sidotti's arrest, it had never been used for this purpose.

Because he was unable to teach religion at Kirishitan Yashiki, Sidotti was, as a matter of course, exempt from torture. Furthermore, he would not be treated like a prisoner, but would be given special treatment, held under what was known as a go-nin fuchi (五人扶持, "5-man food ration") house arrest. His guardians at the mansion were an old couple named Chōsuke and Haru, two former Christians who had renounced their faith. When Sidotti tried to persuade the couple to return to Christianity, he was moved to an underground cell in the mansion, and it was there that he died in 1714. He was 46 years old.

== Family ==
His sister Eleonara was a Franciscan tertiary nun and his brother Filippo was a member of the clergy.

== Legacy ==
Arai Hakuseki used the knowledge gained from his conversations with Sidotti to publish the Seiyō Kibun and the Sairan Igen. An image taken from his belongings, called oyayubi no seibozō (親指の聖母像, "Thumb-sized Image of Virgin Mary") was designated an Important Cultural Property by the MEXT and is now housed in the Tokyo National Museum.

In 2014, three sets of remains were discovered during the excavations of the former Kirishitan Yashiki. The remains were identified as being highly likely to belong to Sidotti, Chōsuke and Haru. With a 2 million yen grant, Tokyo's National Museum of Nature and Science reconstructed his face through the reassembled fragments of his skull.

== See also ==
- Sakoku
- List of Westerners who visited Japan before 1868
