= Arai Hakuseki =

Japanese scholar and official (1657–1725)

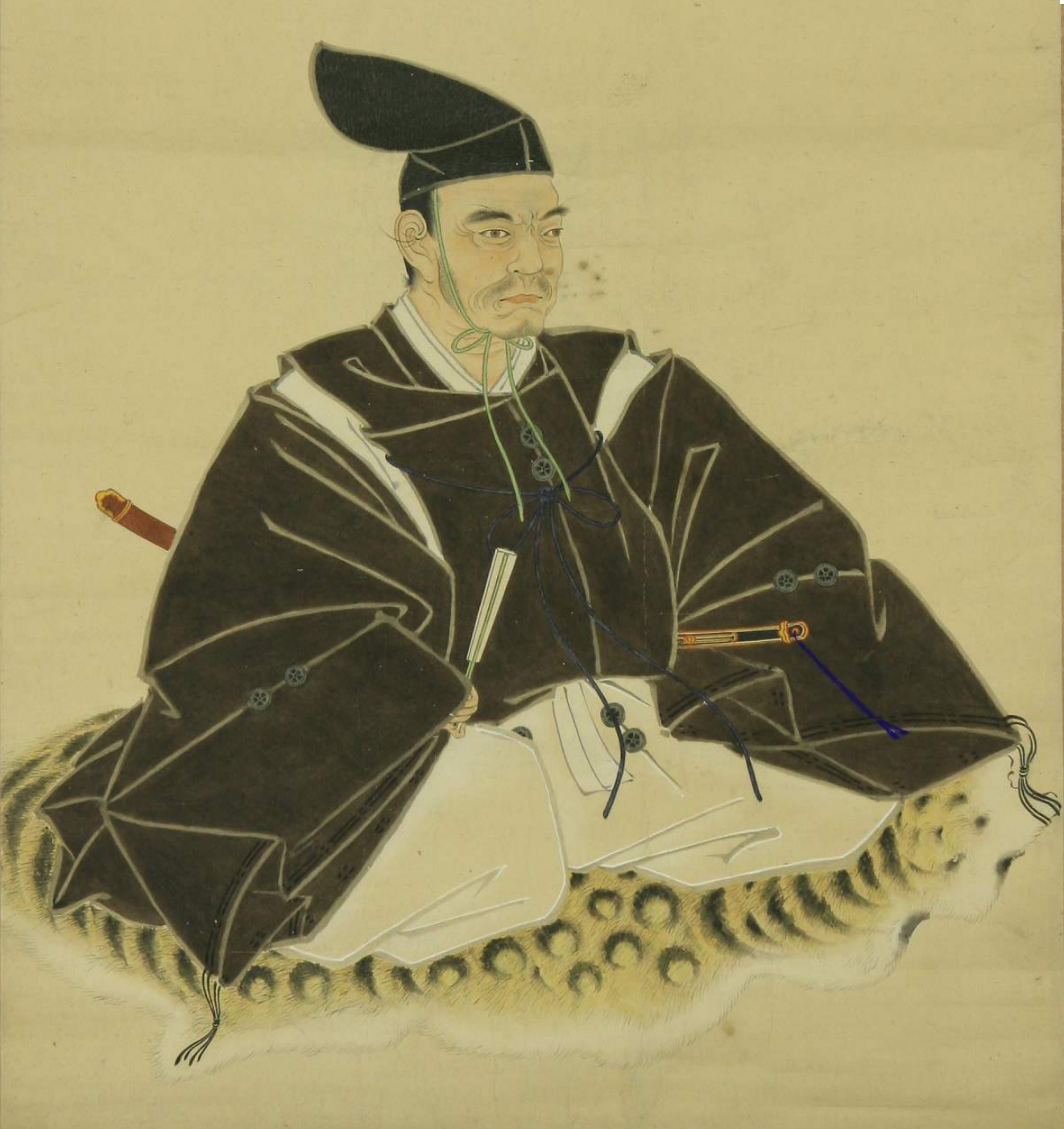
- Arai Hakuseki
- Born: March 24, 1657; Edo
- Died: June 29, 1725 (aged 68); Edo
- Occupations: Neo-confucian scholar, academic, administrator, writer
- Writing career
- Subjects: Japanese history, literature

Arai Hakuseki (新井 白石; March 24, 1657 – June 29, 1725) was a Confucianist, scholar-bureaucrat, academic, administrator, writer and politician in Japan during the middle of the Edo period, who advised the shōgun Tokugawa Ienobu. His personal name was Kinmi or Kimiyoshi (君美). Hakuseki (白石) was his pen name. His father was a Kururi han samurai, Arai Masazumi (新井 正済).

== Biography ==
Hakuseki was born in Edo and from a very early age displayed signs of genius. According to one story, at the age of three, Hakuseki managed to copy a Confucian book written in Kanji, character by character. Because he was born on the same year as the Great Fire of Meireki, a hot-tempered personality, and his eyebrows would distinctively crease looking like 火 or "fire", he was affectionately called Hi no Ko (火の子) or child of fire. He was a retainer of Hotta Masatoshi, but after Masatoshi was assassinated by Inaba Masayasu, the Hotta clan was forced to move from Sakura to Yamagata, then to Fukushima wherein the domain's income declined. Hakuseki decided to leave, becoming a rōnin, and studied under Confucianist Kinoshita Jun'an. He was offered a post by the largest han, that of Kaga Domain, but he refused and recommended the position to a fellow samurai.

In 1693, Hakuseki was called up to serve Manabe Akifusa as a "brain" for the Tokugawa shogunate, and shogun Tokugawa Ienobu. He went on to displace the official Hayashi advisers to become the leading confucianist for Ienobu and Tokugawa Ietsugu. While some of Hakuseki's policies were still carried out after Ienobu's death, after the 6th shogun, Tokugawa Ietsugu died, and Tokugawa Yoshimune's rule began, Hakuseki left his post to begin his career as a prolific writer of Japanese history and Occidental studies.

He was buried in Hoonji temple in Asakusa (current day Taitō, Tokyo), but was later moved to Kotokuji temple in Nakano, Tokyo.

== Economic policy ==
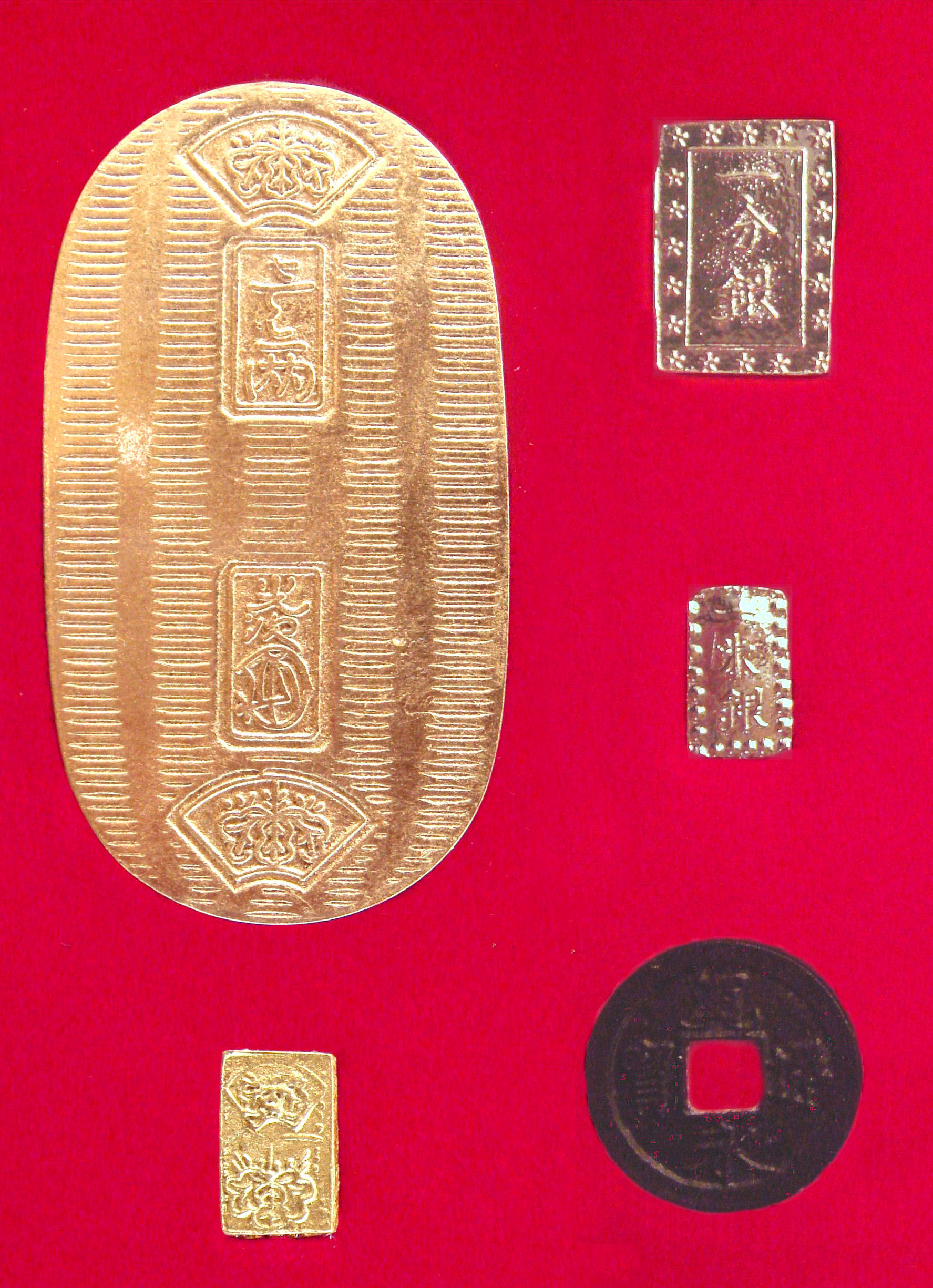
An export ban of Tokugawa coinage was imposed by Arai Hakuseki in 1715.

Under the top Rōjū, Abe Seikyo, with strong support from Ienobu, he launched Shōtoku no chi, a series of economic policies designed to improve the shogunate's standing. By minting new and better quality currency, inflation was controlled. Calculating from trade records, Hakuseki deduced that fully 25% of gold and 75% of silver in Japan had been spent on trades with foreign countries. Concerned that Japan's national resources were at risk, he implemented a new trade policy, the Kaihaku Goshi Shinrei (海舶互市新例), to control payments to Chinese and Dutch merchants by demanding that instead of precious metals, products like silk, porcelain, and dried seafoods should be used for trading. However, the beneficial effects of this policy were limited as the trade of precious metals from Tsushima and Satsuma was uncontrolled by the bakufu.

He also simplified rituals for welcoming the Joseon dynasty's ambassadors, in the face of opposition from the Tsushima Confucianist Amenomori Hōshu.

== Constitutional policy ==
Hakuseki applied the mandate of heaven to both the emperor and the shōgun. Since there had been no revolution to change Japan's basic institutions, he argued that the shogun was subordinate to the emperor and that in showing good governance, moral fortitude and respect to the emperor a shogun proved that he held divine right. He also traced Tokugawa family roots back to the Minamoto clan and thus to a line of imperial descent in order to show that Ieyasu's political supremacy had been fitting. To strengthen the shogun's power and maintain national prestige he proposed changing the title to koku-ō – nation-king.

== Selected works ==
Hakuseki's published writings encompass 237 works in 390 publications in 6 languages and 3,163 library holdings.

- 1709 – 本朝軍器考
- 1709 – Sairan Igen (采覧異言, Collected views and strange words).
- 1711 – Hōka shiryaku (Brief history of currency), also known as Honchō hōka tsūyō jiryaku ("Short Account of the circulation of currency in this realm").
  - _________. (1828). Fookoua Siriak: traité sur l'origins des richesses au japon (translation of Hōka shiryaku by Julius Klaproth). Paris. (in French) (1712).
- 1712 – Tokushi Yoron (読史余論, Lessons from History).
- 1715 – Seiyō Kibun (西洋記聞, Record of things heard from the West). A work describing the Occident, based on Hakuseki's conversations with Giovanni Battista Sidotti
- 1729 – 蝦夷志
- 1760 – 同文通考
- 1805 – 東雅
- 1894 – Hankanfu (藩翰譜). A list of daimyo's family tree
- 1936 – 新井白石集
- 1964 – 戴恩記
- 1977 – 新井白石全集
- 1977 – 新編藩翰譜
- 1981 – 新令句解
- Koshitsu (古史通). A work that detailed ancient history of Japan
- Oritaku Shiba-no-ki (折りたく柴の記). A diary and memoir
