= Tsuchiura =

Tsuchiura 土浦市
- City
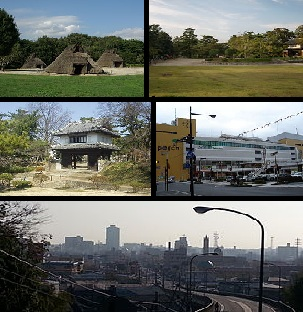
- Upper: Kijo Park; Middle:Tsuchiura Castle, Tsuchiura Station; Lower:Skyline

- Flag Seal

- Location of Tsuchiura in Ibaraki Prefecture

- Coordinates: 36°4′N 140°12′E
- Country: Japan
- Region: Kantō
- Prefecture: Ibaraki
- First official recorded: 770 AD
- City Settled: November 3, 1940

Government
  - Mayor: Mariko Andō (from November 2019)

Area
  - Total: 122.89 km^{2} (47.45 sq mi)

Population (January 2024)
  - Total: 142,181
  - Density: 1,157.0/km^{2} (2,996.6/sq mi)
- Time zone: UTC+9 (Japan Standard Time)
- Phone number: 029-826-1111
- Address: 9-1 Yamato-cho, Tsuchiura-shi, Ibaraki-ken 300-8686
- Climate: Cfa
- Website: Official website
- Symbols
- Bird: Great reed warbler, Japanese bush warbler
- Flower: Sakura
- Tree: Populus, Zelkova serrata

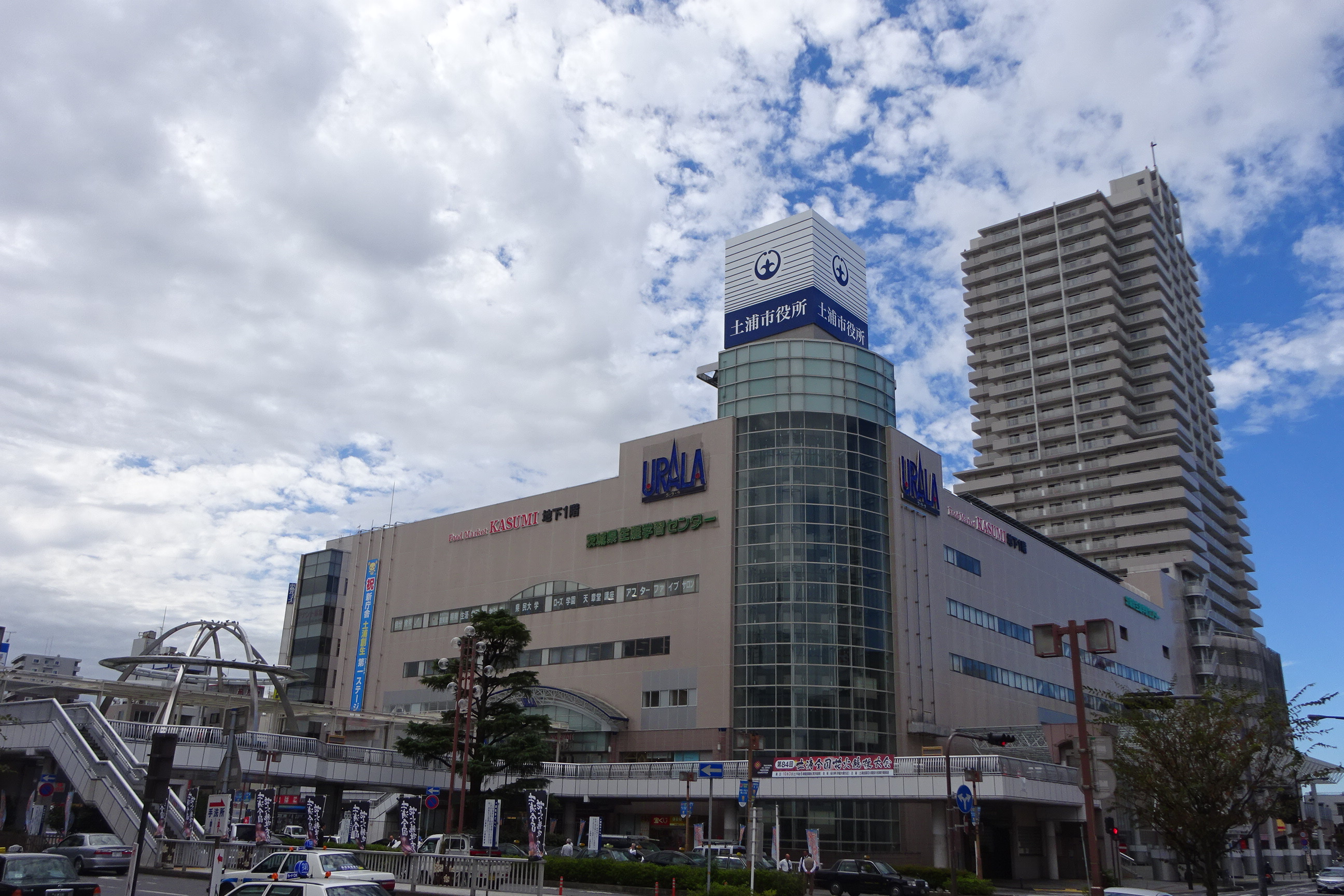
Tsuchiura city hall

Tsuchiura (土浦市, Tsuchiura-shi) is a city in Ibaraki Prefecture, Japan. As of 1 January 2024, the city has an estimated population of 142,181 people in 66,629 households, and a population density of 1,157 persons per squate kilometre. The proportion of the population aged over 65 was 29.7%. The total area of the city is 122.89 square kilometres (47.45 sq mi). About 3,000 residents are non-Japanese, a large proportion of whom are Filipino, Chinese, or Brazilian.

== Geography ==
Located in southwestern Ibaraki Prefecture, Tsuchiura is situated along the western shore of Lake Kasumigaura, the second largest lake in Japan. Tokyo lies about 60 km to the south, and Tsukuba science city borders Tsuchiura to the west.

=== Surrounding municipalities ===
Ibaraki Prefecture

- Ami
- Ishioka
- Kasumigaura
- Tsukuba
- Ushiku

=== Climate ===
Tsuchiura has a humid continental climate (Köppen Cfa) characterized by warm summers and cool winters with light snowfall. The average annual temperature is 13.9 °C. The average annual rainfall is 1286 mm with September as the wettest month. The temperatures are highest, on average, in August, at around 25.8 °C, and lowest in January, at around 2.8 °C.

Climate data for Tsuchiura (1991−2020 normals, extremes 1978−present)
Month	Jan	Feb	Mar	Apr	May	Jun	Jul	Aug	Sep	Oct	Nov	Dec	Year
Record high °C (°F)	18.3 (64.9)	24.1 (75.4)	26.3 (79.3)	29.0 (84.2)	33.5 (92.3)	35.2 (95.4)	38.1 (100.6)	38.5 (101.3)	37.1 (98.8)	33.7 (92.7)	25.4 (77.7)	25.1 (77.2)	38.5 (101.3)
Mean daily maximum °C (°F)	9.4 (48.9)	10.1 (50.2)	13.4 (56.1)	18.6 (65.5)	22.9 (73.2)	25.4 (77.7)	29.4 (84.9)	31.0 (87.8)	27.1 (80.8)	21.6 (70.9)	16.4 (61.5)	11.6 (52.9)	19.7 (67.5)
Daily mean °C (°F)	4.0 (39.2)	4.8 (40.6)	8.2 (46.8)	13.2 (55.8)	17.8 (64.0)	21.0 (69.8)	24.9 (76.8)	26.2 (79.2)	22.8 (73.0)	17.3 (63.1)	11.5 (52.7)	6.3 (43.3)	14.8 (58.7)
Mean daily minimum °C (°F)	−0.9 (30.4)	−0.1 (31.8)	3.2 (37.8)	8.3 (46.9)	13.5 (56.3)	17.6 (63.7)	21.5 (70.7)	22.9 (73.2)	19.4 (66.9)	13.5 (56.3)	6.9 (44.4)	1.5 (34.7)	10.6 (51.1)
Record low °C (°F)	−7.6 (18.3)	−7.1 (19.2)	−4.9 (23.2)	−1.6 (29.1)	3.6 (38.5)	10.1 (50.2)	13.4 (56.1)	16.0 (60.8)	8.8 (47.8)	2.7 (36.9)	−1.9 (28.6)	−6.5 (20.3)	−7.6 (18.3)
Average precipitation mm (inches)	48.8 (1.92)	45.8 (1.80)	90.5 (3.56)	105.1 (4.14)	121.3 (4.78)	123.5 (4.86)	123.6 (4.87)	99.1 (3.90)	171.9 (6.77)	177.7 (7.00)	74.8 (2.94)	47.4 (1.87)	1,229.3 (48.40)
Average precipitation days (≥ 1.0 mm)	4.8	5.4	9.4	10.0	10.7	11.7	10.4	7.5	10.8	10.6	7.3	5.4	104
Mean monthly sunshine hours	196.6	176.6	180.8	184.7	180.3	128.5	150.3	181.5	136.6	136.5	151.4	174.4	1,978.2
Source: Japan Meteorological Agency

== Demographics ==
According to census data, the population of Tsuchiura had plateaued since 2000, following a long period of growth.

Historical population
Year	Pop.	±%
1950	78,344	—
1960	79,779	+1.8%
1970	98,313	+23.2%
1980	121,300	+23.4%
1990	137,103	+13.0%
2000	144,106	+5.1%
2010	143,839	−0.2%
2020	142,074	−1.2%

== History ==
=== Prehistory ===
Human settlement in the Tsuchiura area dates to the Japanese Paleolithic period. Hunter-gatherers inhabited the coastal area of the Pacific Ocean (now Lake Kasumigaura) forming large shell middens, examples of which can be seen at the Kamitakatsu archeological site. Migrants from the Asian mainland brought wet-rice cultivation, as well as iron and bronze technology, during the Yayoi period. In the Kofun period numerous burial mounds were constructed in the area.

=== 8th to 19th centuries ===
During the Nara period the area was organized under the Taihō Code, and what is now Tsuchiura occupied four districts of Hitachi Province. In 939, during the Heian period, Taira no Masakado led an uprising against the central government by attacking the provincial capital at Ishioka, a few kilometers north of Tsuchiura.

During the Kamakura and the Sengoku periods, the area was dominated by several samurai clans. During the Edo period, part of what is now Tsuchiura was administered as a castle town by Tsuchiura Domain, one of the feudal domains under the Tokugawa shogunate. The area prospered due to its position on the Mito Kaidō, a highway connecting Edo with Mito, and on a canal connecting Lake Kasumigaura to Edo Bay.

=== Modern period ===
With the creation of modern municipalities after the Meiji Restoration, the town of Tsuchiura was established on April 1, 1889, within Ibaraki Prefecture. Railroad service was started in Tsuchiura in 1895. The Gothic Revival architecture of the old junior high school from this period can be seen at the Dai'ichi high school.

Tsuchiura was elevated to city status when the towns of Manabe and Tsuchiura were merged on November 3, 1940. During World War II, the city suffered damage in an air raid on June 10, 1945.

On September 1, 1951, Tsuchiura absorbed parts of the village of Asahi on the shore of Arakawa and also absorbed the village of Towa. The city absorbed the village of Kamiotsu on November 1, 1954. On February 20, 2006, the village of Niihari (from Niihari District) was merged into Tsuchiura.

== Government ==
The city is managed by the mayor's office and the city council under the mayor-council government system. The mayor is elected through a citywide election and the members of the city council are elected from districts within the city. The mayor's office is made up of the Mayor, Kiyoshi Nakagawa (中川清), and two Vice Mayors, Hideaki Goto (五頭英明) and Hiroshi Koizumi (小泉祐司). The 28-member city council is headed by Chairperson Kiyoshi Yaguchi (矢口清). Tsuchiura's political system is similar to that of other cities in Japan, as the Local Autonomy Law makes all municipalities uniform in powers and organization.

Tsuchiura sends three members to the Ibaraki Prefectural Assembly.

Tsuchiura is part of Ibaraki 6th district for elections to the lower house of the Diet of Japan.

== Economy ==
Tsuchiura was formerly the center of commerce in southern Ibaraki Prefecture due to its good rail connections and location on Lake Kasumigaura. It was also the location of a major base of the Imperial Japanese Navy Air Corps both before and during the war. In the postwar era, the development of the Japanese national highway system, selection of neighboring Tsukuba as a center for government investment and development, and increasing suburbanization has resulted in the closure of many department stores and commercial facilities in the center of the city. The city has several industrial parks. Present land usage is over 30% agricultural, with lotus root as a famous local crop.

== Education ==
- Tsukuba International University
- Public education:
  - 16 elementary schools
  - 7 middle schools
  - 5 public high schools
  - one special education school
- Private institutions:
  - one elementary school
  - one combined middle/high school
  - 3 high schools

== Transportation ==
=== Railway ===
JR East – Jōban Line

- Arakawaoki - Tsuchiura - Kandatsu

=== Highway ===
- Jōban Expressway – Sakura-Tsuchiura Interchange, Tsuchiura-Kita Interchange
- National Route 6
- National Route 125
- National Route 354

== Sister cities ==
- Friedrichshafen, Germany, since 1994
- (United States) Palo Alto, California, USA, since 2009
- Tainan, Taiwan, since 2023

== Local attractions ==
- site of Tsuchiura Castle
- Tsuchiura National Fireworks Competition

== Notable people ==
- Takayasu Akira, sumo wrestler
- Nobuo Fujita, IJN aviator
- Tomoko Fukumi, judoka
- Mari Iijima, singer-songwriter
- Chiaki Kuriyama, actress
- Junko Minagawa, voice actress
- Haruma Miura, actor, singer
- Kazuhiko Nishijima, physicist
- Junichi Saga, local writer and medical doctor
- Noriyuki Sugasawa, basketball player
- Naosaku Takahashi, novelist and minister
- Takeshi Terauchi, musician
- Yuki Yoza, kickboxer

== In popular media ==
Cerulean City from the Japanese game series Pokémon is geographically placed in the real-world location of Tsuchiura City because of the lake nearby. An example is Kasumi, gym leader.
