= Kimitsu =

Kimitsu 君津市
- City
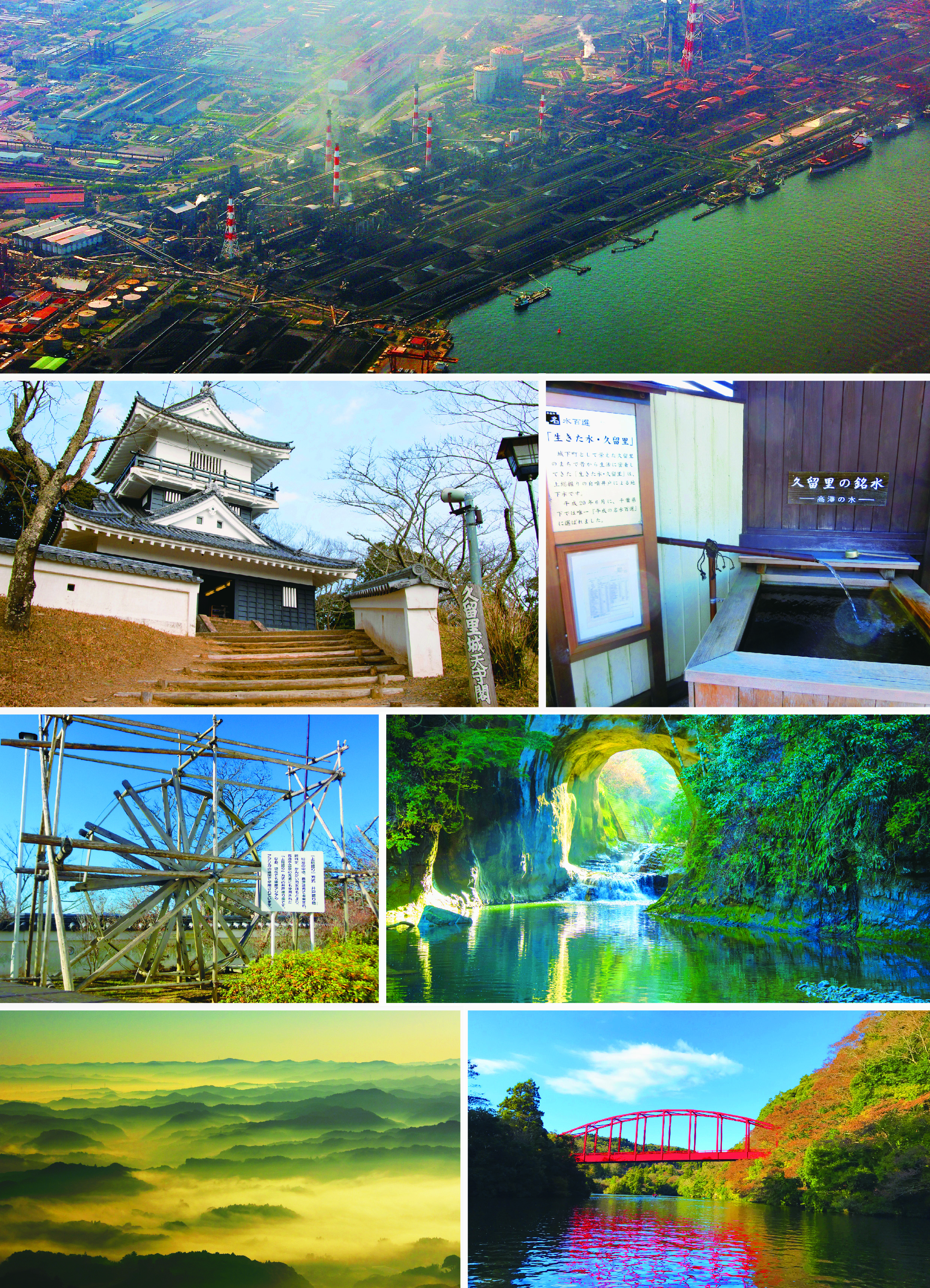
Nippon Steel Kimitsu Steel Works
Kururi Castle	Kururi springs
Kururi Castle waterwheel	Kameya no Iwaya
Mount Kano	Kameyama Dam
- Flag Seal

- Location of Kimitsu in Chiba Prefecture

- Coordinates: 35°19′49.62″N 139°54′9.64″E
- Country: Japan
- Region: Kantō
- Prefecture: Chiba

Government
  - Mayor: Ishii Hiroko (since November 2018)

Area
  - Total: 318.83 km^{2} (123.10 sq mi)

Population (November 2020)
  - Total: 83,058
  - Density: 260.51/km^{2} (674.71/sq mi)
- Time zone: UTC+9 (Japan Standard Time)
- Phone number: 0439-56-1581
- Address: 2-13-1 Kubo, Kimitsu-shi, Chiba-ken 299-1192
- Climate: Cfa
- Website: Official website
- Symbols
- Flower: Mitsubatsutsuji (Rhododendron dilatatum)
- Tree: Kyaraboku (Taxus cuspidata Sieb. et Zucc. var.nana Hort. ex Rehder)

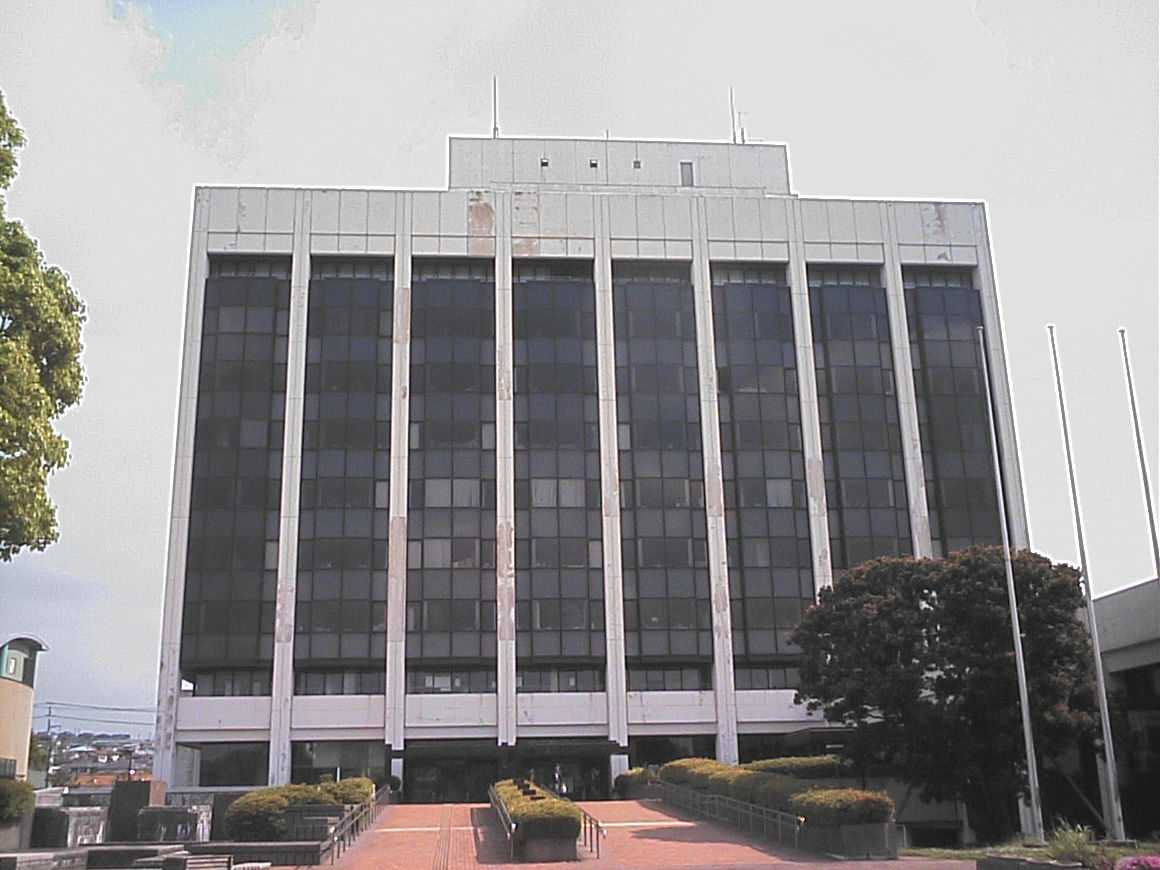
Kimitsu City Hall

Kimitsu (君津市, Kimitsu-shi) is a city located in Chiba Prefecture, Japan. As of 30 November 2020, the city had an estimated population of 83,058 in 39,138 households and a population density of 260 persons per km^{2}. The total area of the city is 318.83 km^{2} (123.10 sq mi).

== Overview ==
The area along Tokyo Bay is in the Kimitsu district of Kisarazu Port, and it is a heavy industrial area centered around Nippon Steel (formerly Yahata Steel and Nippon Steel). The city area is mostly located along the coast around Kimitsu Station. In the inland Kururi area, the JR Kururi Line runs through, and it was a castle town of the Kururi Domain during the Edo period, with historical streets remaining.

Underground water from the Kiyosumi and Mitsuishi mountain ranges was selected as one of the "Top 100 Famous Waters of Heisei" and is known as the "Living Water of Kururi." Kururi is the top producer in Japan of kallos (wetland plants) using the spring water.

In the late 1960s, about 20,000 people from Kyushu moved to the area when the Yahata Steel factory opened. This is known as the "Great Migration," and Kyushu culture remains in many parts of the region.

== Geography ==
Kimitsu is located in the southwestern part of Chiba Prefecture, about 35 kilometers from the prefectural capital, Chiba, and 40 to 50 kilometers from the center of Tokyo. The northwestern part of the city faces Tokyo Bay and forms a part of the expansive Keiyo Industrial Zone. The inland area is lined with mountains in the Bōsō hills. The city area is the second-largest in Chiba Prefecture after Ichihara City. Two small rivers cross Kimitsu, the Koito River and the Obitsu River.

=== Surrounding municipalities ===
Chiba Prefecture

- Futtsu
- Ichihara
- Kamogawa
- Kisarazu
- Ōtaki

=== Climate ===
Kimitsu has a humid subtropical climate (Köppen Cfa) characterized by warm summers and cool winters with light to no snowfall. The average annual temperature in Kimitsu is 14.2 °C (57.6 °F). The average annual rainfall is 2,046.5 mm (80.57 in) with October as the wettest month. The average temperature is highest in August at around 25.3 °C (77.5 °F) and lowest in January at around 3.5 °C (38.3 °F).

Climate data for Kimitsu (1991−2020 normals, extremes 1978−present)
Month	Jan	Feb	Mar	Apr	May	Jun	Jul	Aug	Sep	Oct	Nov	Dec	Year
Record high °C (°F)	20.0 (68.0)	23.6 (74.5)	25.9 (78.6)	27.5 (81.5)	32.6 (90.7)	33.1 (91.6)	37.0 (98.6)	36.6 (97.9)	34.7 (94.5)	31.7 (89.1)	26.2 (79.2)	22.7 (72.9)	37.0 (98.6)
Mean daily maximum °C (°F)	9.6 (49.3)	10.3 (50.5)	13.3 (55.9)	18.0 (64.4)	22.2 (72.0)	24.7 (76.5)	28.7 (83.7)	30.1 (86.2)	26.5 (79.7)	21.3 (70.3)	16.6 (61.9)	12.0 (53.6)	19.4 (67.0)
Daily mean °C (°F)	3.5 (38.3)	4.4 (39.9)	7.8 (46.0)	12.6 (54.7)	17.0 (62.6)	20.2 (68.4)	24.2 (75.6)	25.3 (77.5)	21.9 (71.4)	16.3 (61.3)	11.0 (51.8)	6.0 (42.8)	14.2 (57.5)
Mean daily minimum °C (°F)	−1.7 (28.9)	−1.1 (30.0)	2.2 (36.0)	7.0 (44.6)	12.0 (53.6)	16.4 (61.5)	20.7 (69.3)	21.7 (71.1)	18.2 (64.8)	12.3 (54.1)	6.2 (43.2)	0.8 (33.4)	9.6 (49.2)
Record low °C (°F)	−9.8 (14.4)	−9.6 (14.7)	−6.2 (20.8)	−3.2 (26.2)	1.6 (34.9)	5.6 (42.1)	10.5 (50.9)	13.6 (56.5)	7.0 (44.6)	1.1 (34.0)	−2.5 (27.5)	−7.6 (18.3)	−9.8 (14.4)
Average precipitation mm (inches)	104.5 (4.11)	89.1 (3.51)	187.5 (7.38)	176.1 (6.93)	176.3 (6.94)	208.9 (8.22)	180.5 (7.11)	121.8 (4.80)	252.0 (9.92)	299.7 (11.80)	145.2 (5.72)	96.4 (3.80)	2,046.5 (80.57)
Average precipitation days (≥ 1.0 mm)	6.9	7.3	11.9	11.8	11.0	12.4	10.6	7.7	12.0	12.4	10.0	7.4	121.4
Mean monthly sunshine hours	174.8	152.8	163.3	170.6	176.9	125.7	167.0	198.2	130.1	124.9	139.4	155.7	1,876.2
Source: Japan Meteorological Agency

== Demographics ==
According to Japanese census data, the population of Kimitsu peaked around 2000 and has since declined.

Historical population
Year	Pop.	±%
1950	49,302	—
1960	44,943	−8.8%
1970	70,440	+56.7%
1980	77,286	+9.7%
1990	89,243	+15.5%
2000	92,076	+3.2%
2010	89,168	−3.2%
2020	82,206	−7.8%

== History ==
The area of present-day Kimitsu was largely part of the Kururi Domain under the Edo period Tokugawa shogunate, centered on the jōkamachi of Kururi Castle. It was divided between the Moda District and the Sue District in the early Meiji period cadastral reforms. Both districts became part of Kimitsu District from April 1, 1897. The villages of Susaki and Yaehara were established with the modern municipal system on April 1, 1889. Kimitsu Town was founded by the merger of these villages on April 1, 1943, and expanded through the annexation of two neighboring villages, Sunami and Sadamoto, on April 1, 1944. The town continued to expand by annexing the towns of Kazusa and Koito and the villages of Seiwa and Obitsu on September 28, 1970. Kimitsu was elevated to city status on September 1, 1971.

=== About merger ===
Before Kimitsu City was established, Kimitsu Town went through three mergers in 1943, 1954, and 1970. Except for the 1954 merger, which was based on the Town and Village Merger Promotion Law (known as the "Great Merger of Showa"), the other two mergers had no relation to national policies.

In 1943, when the first Kimitsu Town was formed, Japan was in the middle of World War II. The Yaehara Factory, a branch of the Kisarazu Naval Air Corps, was built on a large area of land across Yaehara Village and Susai Village. As a result, there were issues such as moving houses, buying farmland, and distributing food and clothing to workers. With help from the Japanese military, the two villages merged to create "Kimitsu Town."

The 1970 merger was influenced by the Yahata Steel Factory (now Nippon Steel Kimitsu Works), which moved into the coastal area during the 1960s. The factory increased property tax income for Kimitsu Town. However, if the population were too small, part of the tax would go to Chiba Prefecture. To prevent this, the town merged with other nearby areas to increase the population. At first, Kisarazu City was also part of the merger talks, and a new city name, "Kimitsu-Kisarazu City," was suggested. But since Kisarazu City did not agree, the plan was dropped. On September 28, 1970, five towns and villages merged to form the new "Kimitsu Town." After reaching the population requirements, Kimitsu Town became Kimitsu City on September 1, 1971, becoming the 25th city in Chiba Prefecture.

== Government ==
Kimitsu has a mayor-council form of government with a directly elected mayor and a unicameral city council of 22 members. Kimitsu contributes two members to the Chiba Prefectural Assembly. In terms of national politics, the city is part of the Chiba 12th district of the lower house of the Diet of Japan.

== Economy ==
Despite its short coastline on Tokyo Bay, the economy of Kimitsu is centered around its coastal belt of heavy industries, primarily by the large-scale steelworks of Nippon Steel's Kimitsu Works. Kimitsu Works was established in 1965, covers 11,720,000 square metres (126,200,000 sq ft), and employed 3,280 people as of 2007. The Koito Fishing Port, technically located in both Kimitsu and Futtsu, is located just north of Cape Futtsu at the mouth of the Koito River. Entry in and out of the fishing port suffers from sediment deposited by the Koito. Kazusa Akademia Park, which spans both Kimitsu and Kisarazu, was established to carry out research in biotechnology and information technology.

== Education ==
Kimitsu has 17 public elementary schools and seven public middle schools operated by the city government, and three public high schools operated by the Chiba Prefectural Board of Education. There is also one private middle school and one private high school. The prefecture also operates a special education school for students with disabilities.

== Transportation ==
=== Railway ===
JR East – Uchibō Line

- Kimitsu

JR East – Kururi Line

- Shimogōri - Obitsu - Tawarada - Kururi - Hirayama - Kazusa-Matsuoka - Kazusa-Kameyama

=== Highways ===
- Tateyama Expressway
- National Route 16
- National Route 127
- National Route 410
- National Route 465

== Local attractions ==
- Kameyama Dam (Kameyama Lake)
- Katakura Dam (Sasagawa Lake)
- Kururi Castle
- Mishima Dam (Mishima Lake)
- Seiwa Kenmin No Mori Prefectural Park
- Toyofusa Dam (Toyofusa Lake)

== International relations ==
=== Sister cities ===
Kimitsu is twinned with the following cities.

- Kamogawa, Chiba, Japan
- Uiwang, South Korea
- Rio Claro, Brazil

== Notable people from Kimitsu ==
- Ryo Hayami, Japanese actor (Kamen Rider X)
- Emi Sakura - professional wrestler
- Kōki Yamashita, Japanese professional baseball player (infielder - Yokohama DeNA BayStars, Nippon Professional Baseball - Central League)
- Hiroshi Yamato - professional wrestler
