= Oritaku Shiba no Ki =

Japanese Edo-period autobiography

Told Round a Brushwood Fire
- Author: Arai Hakuseki
- Original title: 折りたく柴の記
- Translator: Joyce Ackroyd
- Language: Japanese
- Genre: Autobiography

Oritaku Shiba no Ki (折りたく柴の記; "Told Round a Brushwood Fire") is an autobiographical text written by Japanese Edo-period scholar-official Arai Hakuseki (1657–1725). It describes Arai's ancestors, his childhood, and his work as an official of the Tokugawa government, providing an invaluable perspective on the Tokugawa government of his day.

== Title ==
Hakuseki does not explain the meaning or significance of the title. The general view is that it is in reference to poem No. 801 in the Shin Kokin Wakashū poetry anthology:

omoiizuru ori taku shiba no yūkeburi musebu mo ureshi wasuregatami ni
At dusk when I think of the one who is no longer here, I am happy to choke on the smoke of the burning brushwood twigs. It is a memento of the one who I can not forget.

This poem was written by Emperor Go-Toba. The smoke that he chokes is an illusion for sobbing for his wife Owari, who died in 1204. The smoke from the burning brushwood twigs reminds him of the smoke from her cremation ceremony.

For Hakuseki, the one who he yearns for and can not forget is Tokugawa Ienobu, the sixth shōgun of the Tokugawa shogunate.

An alternative explanation is suggested by Katsuta Katsutoshi. He argues that Hakuseki did not have a talent for waka and hence he could not have based the title on this poem. Further, in a correspondence with Mura Kyūsō (室鳩巣), Hakuseki writes about his father saying "They would burn brushwood and talk of things past and present throughout the night". Katsuta argues that burning brushwood is a euphemism for reminiscent discussion.

== Translations ==
Oritaku Shiba no Ki has been translated into English by Joyce Ackroyd and released in 1979 under the title Told Round a Brushwood Fire and published by Princeton University Press.
