= Katakura Dam =

Dam in Chiba Prefecture, Japan

- Location within Japan
- Interactive map of Katakura Dam
- Location: Chiba Prefecture, Japan
- Coordinates: 35°12′06″N 140°4′25″E
- Construction began: 1974
- Opening date: 2000

Dam and spillways
- Height: 42.7 m (140 ft)
- Length: 154 m (505 ft)

Reservoir
- Total capacity: 8410 thousand cubic meters
- Catchment area: 18.6 sq. km
- Surface area: 70 hectares

Katakura Dam is a gravity dam located in Chiba Prefecture in Japan. The dam is used for flood control and water supply. The catchment area of the dam is 18.6 km^{2}. The dam impounds about 70 ha of land when full and can store 8410 thousand cubic meters of water. The construction of the dam was started on 1974 and completed in 2000.
