= Tsuchiya Masanao =

Japanese daimyō

Tsuchiya Masanao (土屋 政直; March 16, 1641 – December 23, 1722), was a daimyō in Japan during the Edo period. Masanao's daimyō family was descended from Minamoto Yasuuji (Seiwa-Genji). The descendants of Tsuchiya (1585–1612) lived successively at Kururi in Kazusa Province; after 1669 at Tsuchiura in Hitachi Province; after 1681 at Tanaka in Suruga Province; and then, after 1688, again at Tsuchiura in Hitachi.

He was the Tokugawa shogunate's Kyoto shoshidai in the period spanning October 19, 1686, through November 17, 1687.
