= Satomi Yoshitaka =

Japanese samurai

- 里見 義堯
- Born: 1507? Awa Province
- Died: June 19, 1574; Awa Province
- Military career
- Commands: Kururi Castle
- Conflicts: Battle of Inukake, Battle of Kōnodai, Battle of Miuramisaki, Siege of Kururi Castle

Satomi Yoshitaka (里見 義堯; 1507? – 1574) was a Japanese samurai and head of the Satomi clan.

In 1534, he killed his nephew and became a head of the Satomi clan.

He fought against the Later Hōjō clan under Ashikaga Yoshiaki in the Battle of Kōnodai. However, Yoshiaki was killed during the battle and was defeated. Following the death of Ashikaga Yoshiaki, Yoshitaka expanded his territory and ruled most of the Kazusa Province. In 1554, his Kururi castle was surrounded by 20,000 soldiers of the Later Hōjō clan but Yoshitaka and his son Satomi Yoshihiro defeated them.

He retired in 1562 and relinquished the clan's head position to Yoshihiro.

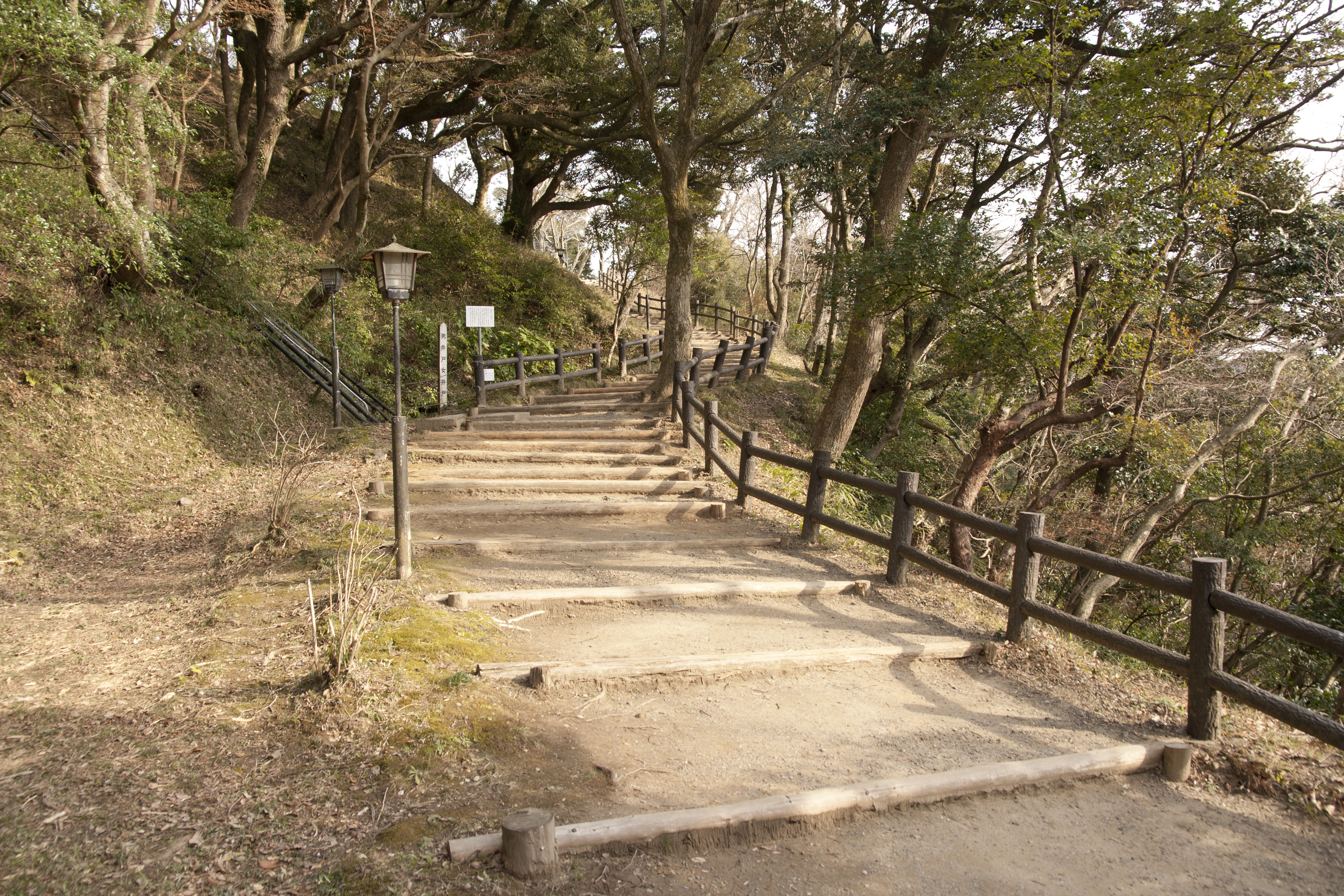
Kururi Castle
