= Rinzo Yuki =

Japanese photographic technology researcher

Rinzo Yuki 結城 林蔵
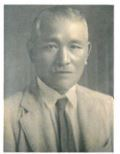
- Born: Rinzo Kubota (久保田 林蔵); Spring in1866 (Keiō 2); Niigata Prefecture, Japan
- Died: September in 1945 (Shōwa 20); Tokyo, Japan
- Occupation(s): photographer, photo-technician, educator
- Known for: a Japanese pioneer of photo-printing
- Notable work: improvement and education of photographic technology

Rinzo YUKI (結城 林蔵: Yūki, Rinzō; birth name: 久保田 林蔵:Kubota, Rinzō, 1866–1945) was a Japanese photographic technology researcher and educator in the eras of Meiji, Taisho, and Showa. He taught photographic techniques and printing at the higher educational schools in the early times before World War II, such as now Tokyo Institute of Technology, Tokyo University of the Arts, and Tokyo Polytechnic University. He was also the first president of the Tokyo Polytechnic University.

== Early life ==
According to a Who's Who in Japan, Nihon Jinji Meikan (『日本人事名鑑』) 1934 year edition, Rinzo Yuki was born in Niigata Prefecture, as the second son of Kanji Kubota (久保田 勘治), in the spring (late March or early April) of 1866. He was graduated from an agricultural school in Niigata Prefecture in 1886 and he married Tome (とめ), the second daughter of Yoshitaka(?) Yuki (結城 義節), when he became the son-in-law of Y. Yuki and changed his name to Rinzo Yuki. He also inherited the patrimony of the Yuki family in 1895.

It is unclear what kind of “agricultural school in Niigata Prefecture” Yuki graduated from. The former Niigata Prefectural Agricultural and Forestry School was founded in 1903 and is not applicable to Yukiʼs alma mater.

== Research and education ==
=== "Tokyo Koto Kogyo Gakko" and studying in Europe ===
In 1900, Yuki started teaching the courses of photographic and printing technology at the Tokyo Koto Kogyo Gakko (東京高等工業学校 now Tokyo Institute of Technology), which was located in Kuramae, Tokyo, as an associate professor. He then, as a government-sponsored international student, went to Germany and Austria for studying photographic technology in November 1902 and returned Japan in March 1905.

=== "Tokyo Bijutsu Gakko" ===
After returning to Japan, he was promoted to professor at the Tokyo Koto Kogyo Gakko, and in 1914, when the photoengraving course was newly established at the Tokyo Bijyutsu Gakko (東京美術学校 now Tokyo University of the Arts Department of Fine Arts) in Ueno, Tokyo, he became professor and head of the course. He taught etching and other subjects at the school. In the same year, he became a competition referee for the Tokyo Photographic Society (東京写真研究会).

=== “Konish Shashin Senmon Gakko” and later life ===
In 1923, Yuki became the first principal of the Konishi Shashin Senmon Gakko (小西写真専門学校 now Tokyo Polytechnic University). He died in September 1945 at age 79.

== Major works ==
- Yuki, Rinzo, and Rokuzo Yasuda. Lecture Notes on Photography and Plate Making (in Japanese), Tokyo: Gengendo, 1907. 結城 林蔵, 安田録造『寫眞及製版講義』東京:元元堂書房, 1907.
- Yuki, Rinzo, and Magoroku Tanaka. New Plate Making Printing (in Japanese), Tokyo: Hakubunkan, 1909. 結城林蔵, 田中孫六『新編製版印刷術』東京:博文館, 1909.
- Yuki, Rinzo, and Magoroku Tanaka. Practical Photography (in Japanese), Tokyo: Hakubunkan, 1910. 結城林蔵, 田中孫六『実用写真術』東京:博文館, 1910.
- Yuki, Rinzo, and Magoroku Tanaka. Photograph Handbook: New Prescription (in Japanese), Tokyo: Hakubunkan, 1912. 結城林蔵, 田中孫六『寫眞術便覧: 最新處方』東京:博文館, 1912.

== See also ==
- photography
- printing
