= Tsuchiya clan =

The emblem (mon) of the Tsuchiya clan

Tsuchiya clan (土屋氏, Tsuchiya-shi) is a Japanese samurai kin group.

== History ==
The Tsuchiya clan descend from Taira no Yoshifumi. Tsuchiya Soen, his descendant in the 6th generation settled at Tsuchiya (Sagami Province) and took the name of the place.

Tsuchiya Masatsugu (1545-1575) was a retainer of the Takeda clan and died at the Battle of Nagashino (1575). His brother Masatsune 1556–1582) followed Takeda Katsuyori and died at the Battle of Tenmokuzan (1582).

According to "Kansei Choshu Shokafu" (Genealogies of Vassals in Edo Bakufu), Tsuchiya Tadanao (1582-1612), son of Masatsune, at the fall of the Takeda clan, escaped with his mother, and went to Kiyonji Temple in Suruga Province. Later he was summoned by Tokugawa Ieyasu to become a retainer. According to "Kanei shoka keizuden" and "Kansei-fu", he was brought up by Acha no tsubone, a concubine of Ieyasu, and served Tokugawa Hidetada as a page. In 1591, he was given 3,000 koku in Sagami, and in 1602 he became the Daimyo of the Kururi Domain in Kazusa Province and was given 20,000 koku.

The clan moved in 1669 to Tsuchiura Domain in Hitachi Province and again in 1681 to Tanaka Domain in Suruga Province. The clan settled from 1688 through 1868 at Tsuchiura (95,000 koku).

After the Meiji Restoration, the head of the clan was made a Viscount in the kazoku peerage system.

== Select list ==
- Tsuchiya Tadanao (1585–1612)

== See also ==
- Tsuchiya Masatsugu
