= Mishima Dam (Chiba) =

Dam in Chiba Prefecture, Japan

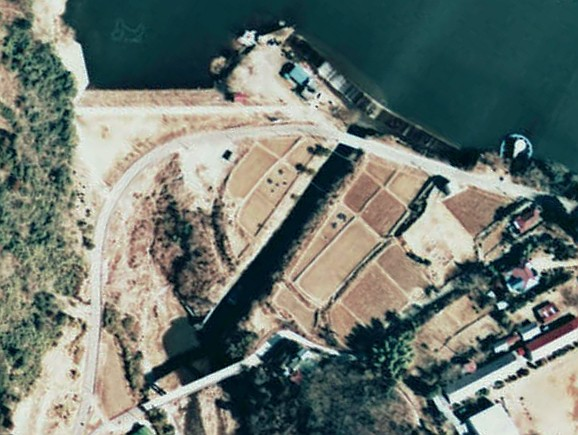

- Location within Japan
- Location: Chiba Prefecture, Japan
- Coordinates: 35°13′16″N 140°1′35″E
- Opening date: 1955

Dam and spillways
- Height: 25.3 m (83 ft)
- Length: 127.7 m (419 ft)

Reservoir
- Total capacity: 5400 thousand cubic meters
- Catchment area: 26.1 sq. km
- Surface area: 72 hectares

Mishima Dam is an earthfill dam located in Chiba Prefecture in Japan. The dam is used for irrigation. The catchment area of the dam is 26.1 km^{2}. The dam impounds about 72 ha of land when full and can store 5400 thousand cubic meters of water. The construction of the dam was completed in 1955.
