= Inaba =

Inaba (written: 稲葉 or 因幡) is a Japanese surname. Notable people with the surname include:

- Akira Inaba (稲葉 陽; born 1988), Japanese shogi player
- Atsuko Inaba (稲葉 貴子; born 1974), Japanese singer
- Atsunori Inaba (稲葉 篤紀; born 1972), Japanese baseball player
- Atsushi Inaba (稲葉 敦志; born 1971), Japanese video game producer and designer
- Carrie Ann Inaba (born 1968), American dancer, choreographer, actress, television host, and singer
- Daiki Inaba (稲葉 大樹; born 1988), Japanese professional wrestler
- Darryl S. Inaba (born 1946), American pharmacologist
- Hideaki Inaba (因幡 英昭; born 1944), Japanese powerlifter
- Hiroshi Inaba (稲葉 博志; born 1948), Japanese bobsledder
- Hisahito Inaba (稲葉 久人; born 1985), Japanese footballer
- Ian Inaba, (born 1971), American film and music video director, producer, and journalist
- Kayo Inaba (稲葉 カヨ), Japanese biologist
- Kazuyo Inaba (稲葉 和世; born 1959), Japanese swimmer
- Kosaku Inaba (稲葉 興作; 1924–2006), Singapore-born Japanese businessman
- Koshi Inaba (稲葉 浩志; born 1964), Japanese vocalist
- Kotaro Inaba (稲葉 洸太郎; born 1982), Japanese futsal player
- Inaba Masaaki (稲葉 正明; 1723–1793), Japanese daimyō
- Inaba Masakatsu (稲葉 正勝; 1597–1634), Japanese daimyō
- Inaba Masakuni (稲葉 正邦; 1834–1898), Japanese daimyō
- Inaba Masami (稲葉 正巳; 1815–1879), Japanese daimyō
- Inaba Masamori (稲葉 正盛; 1791–1820), Japanese daimyō
- Inaba Masanobu (稲葉 正謖; 1749–1806), Japanese daimyō
- Inaba Masao (稲葉 正夫; 1908–1973), Japanese military officer
- Inaba Masanori (稲葉 正則; 1623–1696), Japanese daimyō
- Inaba Masatake (稲葉 正武; 1769–1840), Japanese daimyō
- Inaba Masayasu (稲葉 正休; 1640–1684), Japanese daimyō
- Inaba Masayoshi (稲葉 正善; 1848–1902), Japanese daimyō
- Mayumi Inaba (稲葉 真弓; 1950–2014), Japanese writer and poet
- Minoru Inaba (稲葉 実; born 1951), Japanese voice actor
- Yamato Inaba (稲葉 大和; born 1943), Japanese politician
- Yasuhiro Inaba (稲葉 泰弘; born 1985), Japanese sport wrestler
- Inaba Yoshimichi (稲葉 良通; 1515–1589), Japanese samurai
- Yoshio Inaba (稲葉 義男; 1920–1998), Japanese actor
- Yu Inaba (稲葉 友; born 1993), Japanese actor

== Fictional characters ==
- Inaba, a character from the Japanese manga and anime series Urusei Yatsura
- Himeko Inaba, a character from the Japanese light novel series Kokoro Connect
- Reisen Udongein Inaba and Tewi Inaba, characters in Imperishable Night from the Touhou Project series
- Kageroza Inaba, an anime-exclusive character from the 15th season of the Bleach anime, in the Gotei 13 Invading Army arc

== See also ==
- Inaba clan, a Japanese samurai clan
