= Tottori Prefectural Museum of Art =

Art museum in Kurayoshi, Tottori, Japan

Tottori Prefectural Museum of Art 鳥取県立美術館
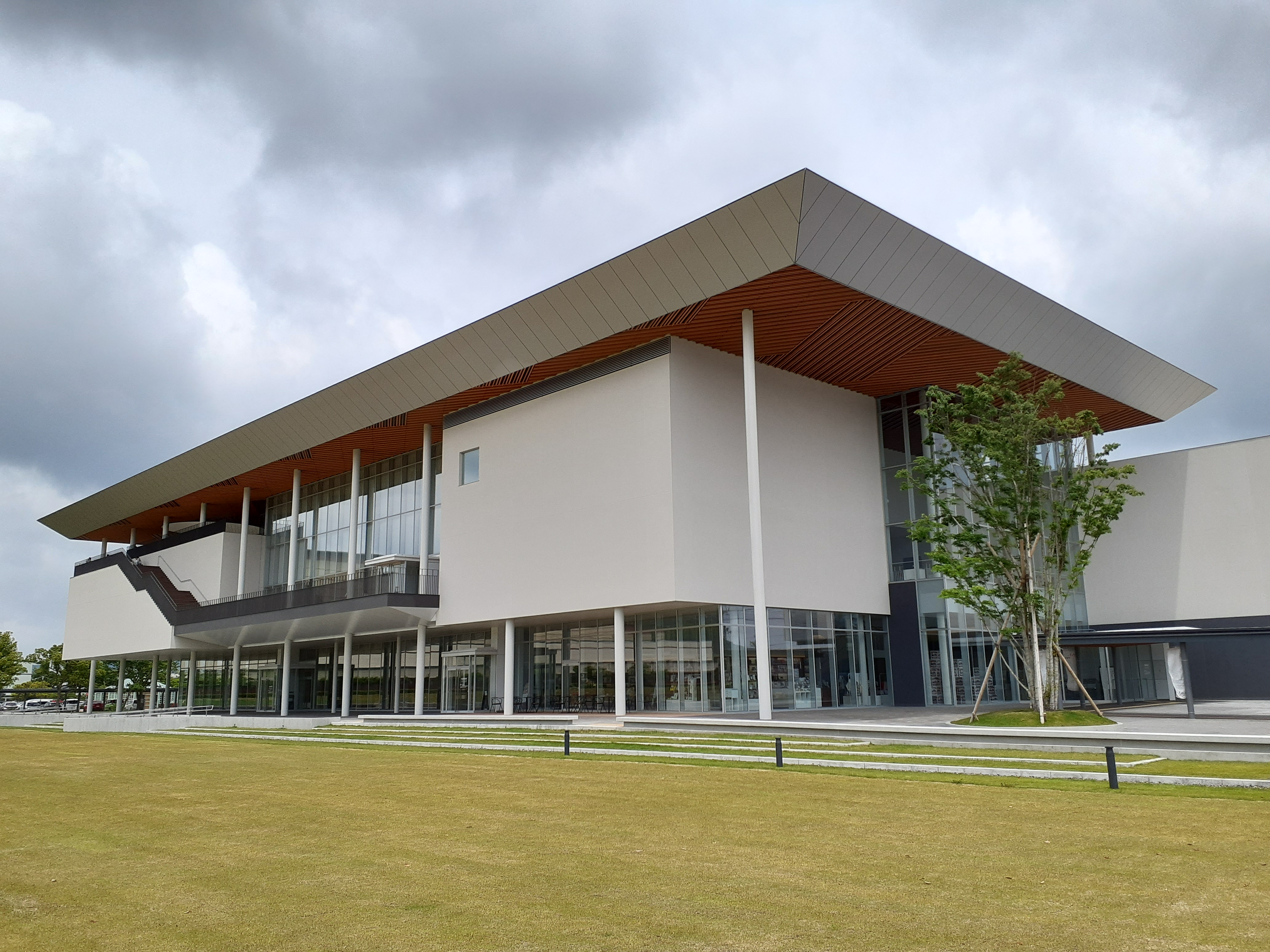

General information
- Location: 2-3-12 Dakyōji-chō, Kurayoshi, Tottori Prefecture, Japan
- Coordinates: 35°25′57″N 133°50′20″E
- Completed: 2024

Design and construction
- Architecture firm: Maki & Associates

Website
- tottori-moa.jp (ja)

Tottori Prefectural Museum of Art (鳥取県立美術館, Tottori Kenritsu Bijutsukan) is scheduled to open in Kurayoshi, Tottori Prefecture, Japan, on 30 March 2025. Located adjacent to Ōmidō temple ruins, the new museum's artworks are to be transferred from the collection of Tottori Prefectural Museum.

== See also ==
- Tottori Nijisseiki Pear Museum
