= Sōja shrine =

Type of Shinto shrine

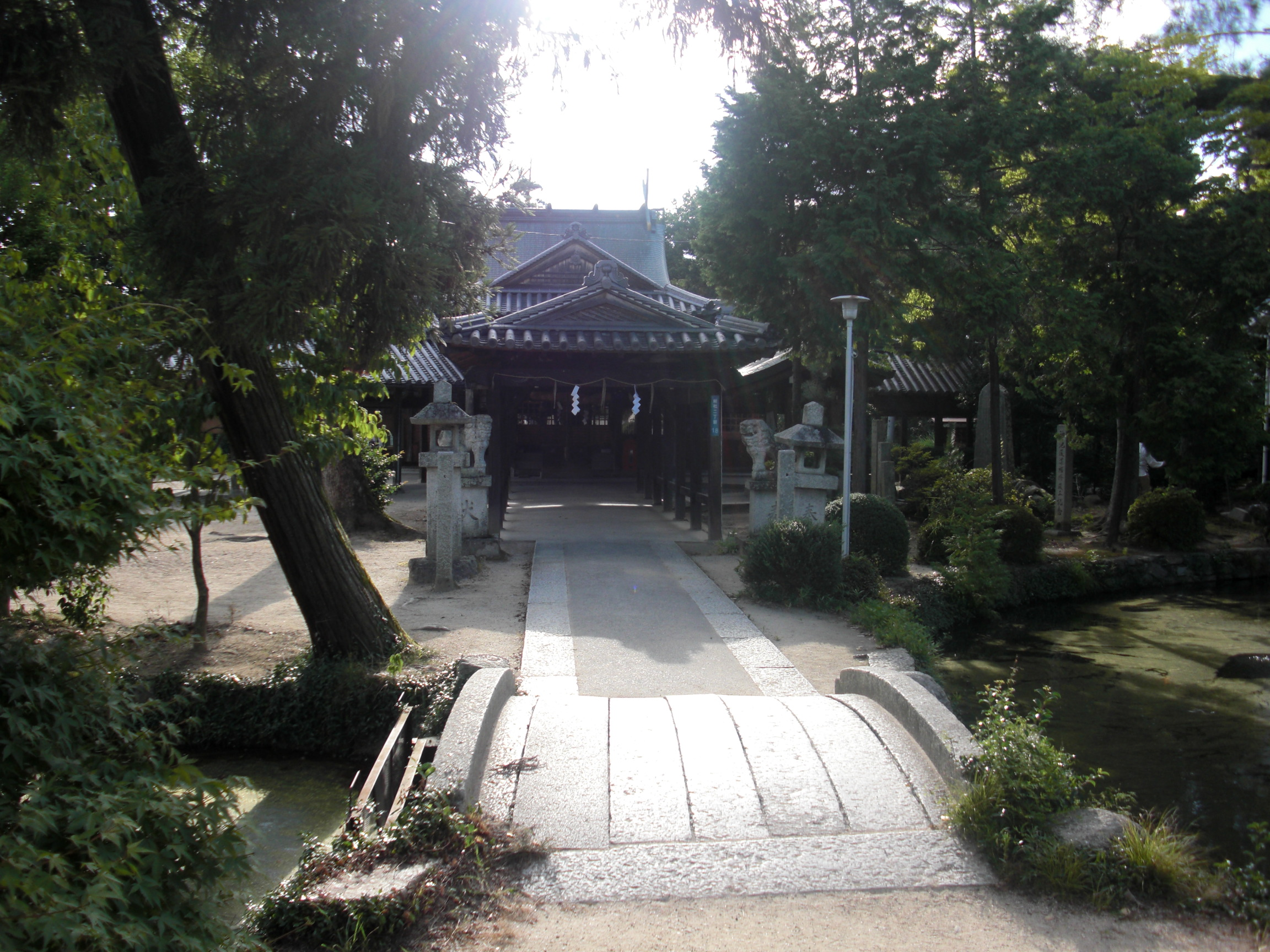
Sōjagū in Sōja, Okayama, where 304 kami of Bitchu Province are collectively worshipped

Sōja (総社) is a type of Shinto shrine where the kami of a region are grouped together into a single sanctuary. This "region" may refer to a shōen, village or geographic area, but is more generally referred to as a whole province. The term is also occasionally called "sōsha". The sōja are usually located near the provincial capital established in the Nara period under then ritsuryō system, and can either be a newly created shrine, or a designation for an existing shrine. The "sōja" can also be the "ichinomiya" of the province, which themselves are of great ritual importance.

Whenever a new kokushi was appointed by the central government to govern a province, it was necessary for him to visit all of the sanctuaries of his province in order to complete the rites necessary for ceremonial inauguration. Grouping the kami into one location near the capital of the province greatly facilitated this duty,

The first mention of "sōja" appeared in the Heian period, in the diary of Taira no Tokinori, dated March 9, 1099 in reference to the province of Inaba.

The name "Sōja" is also found in place names such as the city of Sōja in Okayama Prefecture.

Rokusho shrine (six place) is a very common Soja shrine name.

== Provincial Soja shrines ==
Region	Province	Shrine	Location	Engishiki Jinmyocho	Modern system of ranked Shinto shrines	Beppyo?
Kinai	Yamashiro	unknown				
Kinai	Yamato	unknown	Takatori, Nara			
Kinai	Kawachi	Shikiagatanushi Shrine	Fujiidera, Osaka	Shikinai Taisha	Son-sha	
Kinai	Izumi	Izumi Inoue Shrine	Izumi, Osaka		Fuken-sha	
Kinai	Settsu	Nanba Shrine (Note: Theorized identification. No confirmation)			Fuken-sha	
Tōkaidō	Iga Province	unknown				
Tōkaidō	Ise	Inatomi Shrine	Suzuka, Mie	Shikinai Shosha	Ken-sha	
Tōkaidō	Ise	Miyake Shrine	Suzuka, Mie	Shikinai Shosha	Son-sha	
Tōkaidō	Shima	Kokufu Shrine	Shima, Mie		Son-sha	
Tōkaidō	Owari	Owari Ōkunitama Shrine	Inazawa, Aichi	Shikinai Shosha	Kokuhei Shōsha	Yes
Tōkaidō	Mikawa	Mikawa Sōja	Toyokawa, Aichi		Ken-sha	
Tōkaidō	Tōtōmi	Ōmikunitama Shrine	Iwata, Shizuoka	Shikinai Shosha	Ken-sha	
Tōkaidō	Suruga	Shizuoka Sengen Shrine (Kambe Junja)	Shizuoka, Shizuoka	Shikinai Shosha	Kokuhei Shōsha	Yes
Tōkaidō	Izu	Mishima Taisha (Note: Theorized identification. No confirmation)	Mishima, Shizuoka		Kanpei Taisha	
Tōkaidō	Kai	Kaina Shrine 1st location	Fuefuki, Yamanashi	Shikinai Shosha	Son-sha	
Tōkaidō	Kai	Kaina Shrine 2nd location	Fuefuki, Yamanashi	Shikinai Shosha	Son-sha	
Tōkaidō	Kai	Miyamae-cho Hachimangu (3rd location)	Kōfu, Yamanashi		Ken-sha	
Tōkaidō	Sagami	Rokusho Shrine	Ōiso, Kanagawa		Gō-sha	
Tōkaidō	Musashi	Ōkunitama Shrine	Fuchū, Tokyo		kanpei-shōsha	Yes
Tōkaidō	Awa	Rokusho Shrine	Tateyama, Chiba		Unknown	
Tōkaidō	Awa	Tsuruya Hachiman Shrine (2nd location)	Tateyama, Chiba		Ken-sha	
Tōkaidō	Kazusa	Togakushi Shrine	Ichihara, Chiba		Son-sha	
Tōkaidō	Kazusa	Iigaoka Hachimangu (2nd location)	Ichihara, Chiba		Ken-sha	
Tōkaidō	Shimōsa	Rokusho Shrine	Ichikawa, Chiba		Son-sha	
Tōkaidō	Hitachi	Hitachi-no-Kuni Sōshagū	Ishioka, Ibaraki		Ken-sha	
Tōsandō	Ōmi	unknown				
Tōsandō	Mino	Nangū Otabi Shrine	Tarui, Gifu		Setsumatsusha	
Tōsandō	Hida	Hida Sōja	Takayama, Gifu		Ken-sha	
Tōsandō	Shinano	Shinano Omiya Shrine	Ueda, Nagano		Ken-sha	
Tōsandō	Shinano	Iwa Shrine (2nd location)	Matsumoto, Nagano		Son-sha	
Tōsandō	Kōzuke	Sōja Shrine	Maebashi, Gunma		Ken-sha	
Tōsandō	Shimotsuke	Ōmiwa Shrine (Shimotsuke)	Tochigi, Tochigi	Shikinai Shosha	Ken-sha	
Tōsandō	Mutsu	Mutsu Sōsha-no-miya	Tagajō, Miyagi		Son-sha	
Tōsandō	Dewa	Rokusho Shrine	Tsuruoka, Yamagata		Gō-sha	
Hokurikudō	Wakasa	Sō Shrine	Obama, Fukui		Son-sha	
Hokurikudō	Echizen	Sōja Daijingū	Echizen, Fukui		Ken-sha	
Hokurikudō	Kaga	Isobe Shrine	Komatsu, Ishikawa	Shikinai Shosha	Gō-sha	
Hokurikudō	Noto	Sōsha	Nanao, Ishikawa		Son-sha	
Hokurikudō	Etchū	Keta Shrine (Note: Theorized identification. No confirmation)			Fuken-sha	
Hokurikudō	Echigo	Fuchū Hachiman-gū	Jōetsu, Niigata		Unknown	
Hokurikudō	Sado	Sōsha Shrine	Sado, Niigata		Unknown	
San'indō	Tamba	Sō Shrine	Nantan, Kyoto		Unknown	
San'indō	Tango	Kono Shrine (Note: Theorized identification. No confirmation)			Kokuhei Chūsha	
San'indō	Tajima	Keta Shrine	Toyooka, Hyōgo	Shikinai Shosha	Gō-sha	
San'indō	Inaba	unknown				
San'indō	Hōki	Kokuchōri Shrine (Sōja-daimyōjin)	Kurayoshi, Tottori	Shikigeisha	Ken-sha	
San'indō	Izumo	Rokusho Shrine	Matsue, Shimane		Ken-sha	
San'indō	Iwami	Ikan Shrine	Hamada, Shimane	Shikinai Shosha	Son-sha	
San'indō	Oki	Tamawakasumikoto Shrine (Sōja-daimyōjin)	Okinoshima, Shimane	Shikinai Shosha	Ken-sha	
San'indō	Oki	Araki Shrine	Okinoshima, Shimane		Son-sha	
San'yōdō	Harima	Itatehyōzu Shrine	Himeji, Hyōgo	Shikinai Shosha	Ken-sha	Yes
San'yōdō	Mimasaka	Mimasaka Sōjagū	Tsuyama, Okayama		Ken-sha	
San'yōdō	Bizen	Bizen-no-Kuni Sōjagū	Okayama, Okayama		Gō-sha	
San'yōdō	Bitchū	Bitchū-no-kuni Sōjagū	Sōja, Okayama		Ken-sha	
San'yōdō	Bingo	Ono Shrine	Fuchū, Hiroshima		Unknown	
San'yōdō	Aki	unknown				
San'yōdō	Aki	Take Shrine	Fuchū, Hiroshima	Myojin Taisha	Ken-sha	
San'yōdō	Suō	Saba Shrine	Hōfu, Yamaguchi		Ken-sha	
San'yōdō	Nagato	Sōsha-gū (subshrine of Iminomiya Shrine)	Shimonoseki, Yamaguchi		Setsumatsusha	
San'yōdō	Nagato	Wakamiya Shrine	Shimonoseki, Yamaguchi		Unknown	
Nankaidō	Kii	Fumori Shrine	Wakayama, Wakayama		Son-sha	
Nankaidō	Awaji	Jūichimyōjin Shrine	Minamiawaji, Hyōgo		Son-sha	
Nankaidō	Awa	Hachiman Sōsha Ryo Shrine	Tokushima, Tokushima		Son-sha	
Nankaidō	Awa	Omiwa Shrine	Tokushima, Tokushima	Shikinai Shosha	Ken-sha	
Nankaidō	Sanuki	Sōja Shrine	Sakaide, Kagawa		Gō-sha	
Nankaidō	Iyo	Ikanashi Shrine	Imabari, Ehime	Shikinai Shosha	Son-sha	
Nankaidō	Tosa	Tosa Kokubun-ji	Nankoku, Kōchi		Gō-sha	
Saikaidō	Chikuzen	unknown				
Saikaidō	Chikugo	Kōra taisha	Kurume, Fukuoka		Kokuhei Taisha	
Saikaidō	Buzen	Sōsha Hachiman-gū	Miyako, Fukuoka		Gō-sha	
Saikaidō	Bungo	unknown				
Saikaidō	Hizen	unknown				
Saikaidō	Higo	Kitaoka Shrine	Kumamoto, Kumamoto		Fuken-sha	
Saikaidō	Hyūga	Tsuma Shrine	Saito, Miyazaki	Shikinai Shosha	Ken-sha	
Saikaidō	Ōsumi	Haraido Shrine	Kirishima, Kagoshima		Son-sha	
Saikaidō	Satsuma	Shukō Shrine subshrine of Nitta Shrine	Satsumasendai, Kagoshima		Setsumatsusha	
Saikaidō	Iki	Kō Shrine	Iki, Nagasaki		Son-sha	
Saikaidō	Tsushima	unknown				
Hokkaido		Hakodate Hachimangū			Kokuhei Chūsha	

== Regional Soja shrines ==
Regional Soja Shrines are Soja shrines dedicated to a specific region rather than a whole province. These include

- Akasaka Uenoyama Shrine
- Unakoro Waki Shrine
- Ono Shrine (Ritto City)
- Ogami Shrine (Tonami City)
- Kainan Shrine
- Katsushika Shrine
- Katsube Shrine
- Mukuhashi Shrine
- Kotai Jingu (Fujisawa City)
- Gosho Shrine (Sammu City)
- Sakata Shinmei Shrine
- Shinkai Sansha Shrine
- Sazama Shrine (Daito City)
- Kenda Suga Shrine
- Tachibana Shrine (Kawasaki City)
- Torakashi Shrine
- Nagao Shrine
- Nanba Shrine (may have historically been a provincial one)
- Arayaza Amaterasu Mitama Shrine
- Nogi Shrine
- Hotaka Shrine
- Washinomiya Shrine

== See also ==
- List of Shinto shrines
- Ichinomiya
- Kokubun-ji
