= Okamoto Castle (Chiba) =

Castle in Minamibōsō, Japan

- 岡本城
- Minamibōsō, Chiba Prefecture, Japan

Site information
- Type: Hirayama-style Japanese castle
- Condition: ruins

Location
- Okamoto Castle Okamoto Castle (Japan)
- Coordinates: 35°03′00.2″N 139°50′07.1″E

Site history
- Built: 1570
- Built by: Satomi clan
- Demolished: 1590

Okamoto Castle (岡本城, Okamoto-jō) was a Muromachi period Japanese castle located in what is now the city of Minamibōsō, Chiba Prefecture, Japan. The ruins have been protected as a National Historic Site since 2012 together with Inamura Castle as the Satomi clan castle ruins (里見氏城跡, Satomi-shi shiro ato).

== Overview ==
Okamoto Castle was located on a hill with an elevation of 60 meters overlooking Tokyo Bay, north of the former town of Tomiura. The layout of the castle was a rough "U" shape, extending 500 meters long and 200 meters wide across the top of the hill. The inner bailey was a flat area 50 meters long and 20 meters wide at the western end of the hill, and there might have been a watchtower at this end. At the middle of the castle there is a small peak having a small stone wall at its slope, and there is another large area at the east end of the castle, where the main gate is presumed to have been located. Many terraces were built on the slopes surrounding these core areas, and were protected by dry moats and earthen ramparts.

== History ==
After the fall of the Kamakura shogunate in 1333, the Kantō region was high unstable due to incessant conflict between the Kantō kubō under Ashikaga Shigeuji based in Kamakura and the Ashikaga shogunate, represented by the Kantō Kanrei under Uesugi Noritada. The minor lords of Awa were loyal to the Kanrei, but geographically the province was very near Kamakura, separated only by the narrow Uraga Channel. To seize Awa Province, the Kantō kubō sent the Satomi clan under Satomi Yoshizane (1412-1488), who landed at Shirahama where he built Shirahama Castle. He gradually expanded to conquer the province from his base at Inamura Castle. In 1516, Odawara-based Hōjō clan defeated the Miura clan and seized Miura Peninsula, opposite of Uraga Channel from Awa Province. Furthermore, the Hōjō expanded northward along Tokyo Bay, capturing Edo Castle by 1524. This threatened the Satomi clan from west and north. In response, Satomi Yoshitoyo launched an amphibious invasion of Kamakura, in the process of which his forces burned down the famed Shinto shrine of Tsurugaoka Hachiman-gu. This was a massive loss of prestige for Yoshitoyo, and led to an internal conflict within the Satomi clan. Satomi Sanetaka, head of a cadet branch of the clan attempted a coup d'etat with Hōjō assistance in 1533, but the attempt failed and he was killed. Yoshitoyo then attacked Sanetaka's son, Satomi Yoshitaka, but Yoshitaka escaped and together with the Hōjō and a strong navy, he managed to drive out Yoshitoyo and seize power the following year. He then broke his alliance with the Hōjō and revived the ancient feud between the clans.

Okamoto Castle was built around the year 1570 by the Satomi clan as a base for their navy. Soon afterwards, Satomi Yoshitaka seized Kazusa Province and from his base at Kururi Castle turned his attention to Shimōsa Province. Meanwhile, the Hōjō has taken control of Musashi Province to the north of Shimōsa. The Hōjō were far stronger, and their armies broke the Satomi forces and even attacked Kururi Castle, but Yoshitaka turned to Uesugi Kenshin for assistance and kept his independence. After his death in 1574, Uesugi Kenshin lost all of his territories in the Kantō region and could no longer assist the Satomi. Yoshitaka's son, Satomi Yoshihiro (1530-1578) pledged fealty to the Hōjō and surrendered the northern half of Kazusa Province. After his death to illness in 1578, a conflict arose between his son, Satomi Yoshishige and his younger brother, Satomi Yoshiyori. Yoshiyori had the support of the Hōjō and defeated Yoshishige, but the clan was severely weakened. In order to better control commerce and to make better use of their maritime power, he relocated his seat from Kururi to Okamoto.

By 1580, as the situation for clan improved, he built Tateyama Castle. In 1590, Toyotomi Hideyoshi launched a campaign to destroy the Hōjō. Satomi Yoshiyasu quickly attacked the Hōjō strongholds in Kazusa in an arbitrary attempt to recover his former territories. However, as these attacks took place without Hideyoshi's permission or coordination with Toyotomi generals, Hideyoshi was angered, and he subsequently reduced the Satomi clan's holding to only Awa Province. Yoshiyasu relocated his seat from Okamoto to Tateyama and Okamoto Castle was abandoned around this time.

At present, nothing remains of the castle except for remnants of its terraces on the hillside, and much has reverted to farmland. During an archaeological excavation, fragments of Chinese porcelain and other trade goods were discovered, indicating that the area was also used as a port. In 1898, a monument was erected by an old pine tree on the castle site said to be a surviving remnant of a garden from the time of Satomi Yoshiyori. In 1911, the Meiji government erected a Shinto shrine dedicated to the Satomi clan on the site of the castle.

== See also ==
- List of Historic Sites of Japan (Chiba)

== Literature ==
- Schmorleitz, Morton S. (1974). Castles in Japan. Tokyo: Charles E. Tuttle Co. pp. 144–145. ISBN 0-8048-1102-4.
- Motoo, Hinago (1986). Japanese Castles. Tokyo: Kodansha. p. 200 pages. ISBN 0-87011-766-1.
- Mitchelhill, Jennifer (2004). Castles of the Samurai: Power and Beauty. Tokyo: Kodansha. p. 112 pages. ISBN 4-7700-2954-3.
- Turnbull, Stephen (2003). Japanese Castles 1540-1640. Osprey Publishing. p. 64 pages. ISBN 1-84176-429-9.
