= Satomi clan =

Japanese samurai clan

Satomi
- Satomi clan emblem
- Home province: Kōzuke Province, Awa Province
- Parent house: Minamoto clan (Seiwa Genji); Nitta clan
- Titles: various
- Founder: Satomi Yoshitoshi
- Final ruler: Satomi Tadayoshi
- Founding year: 13th century
- Ruled until: 1622

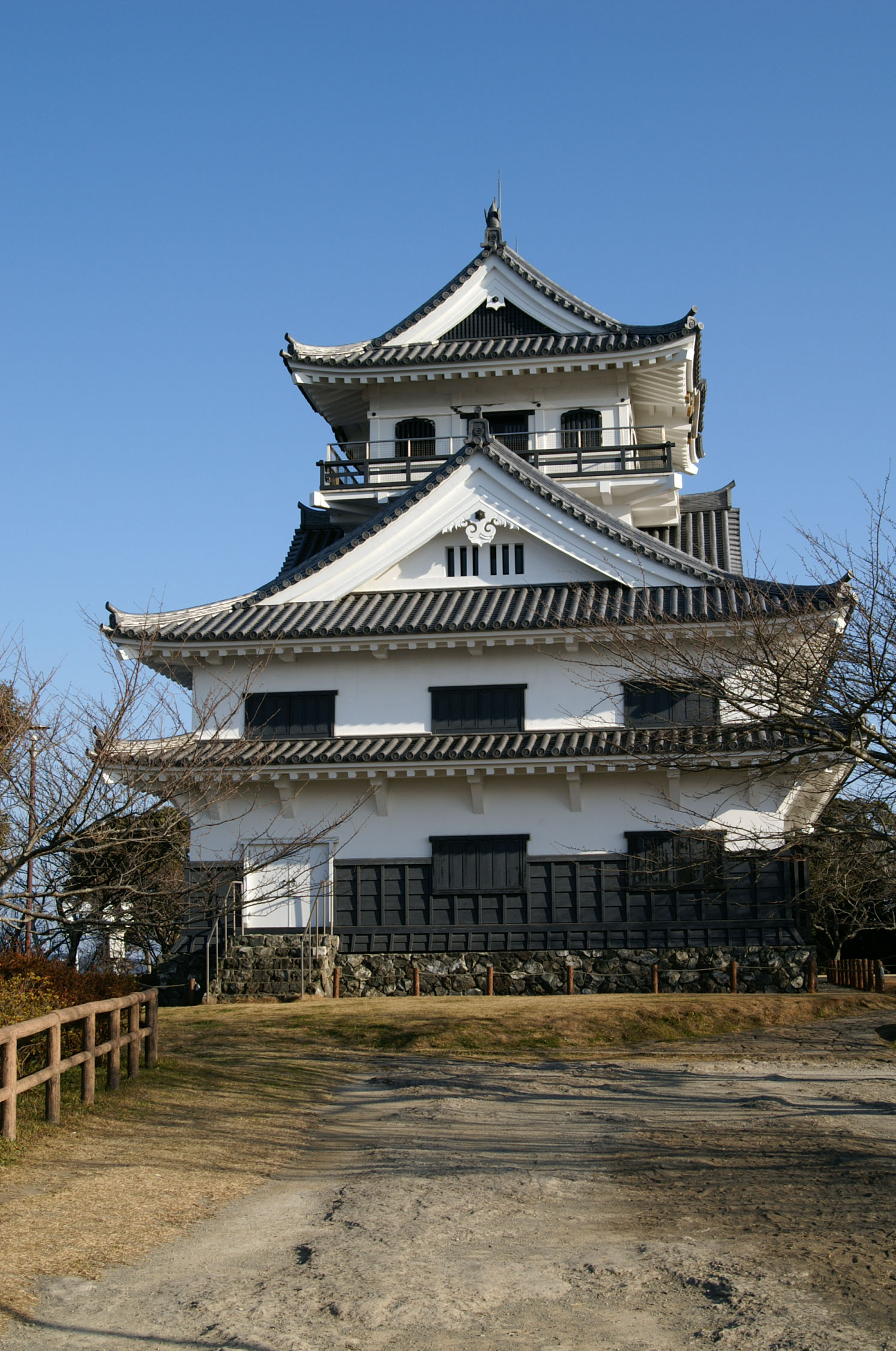
Tateyama Castle, erected in 1580

The Satomi clan (里見氏, Satomi-shi) was a Japanese samurai clan of the Sengoku period (1467–1573) and early Edo period (1603–1868). The clan ruled Awa Province as a Sengoku daimyō and was a major military power in the Kantō region during the wars of the Nanboku-chō period. Although confirmed as daimyō of Tateyama Domain by the Tokugawa shogunate.

== Origins ==
The Satomi claimed descent from the Seiwa Genji clan via Nitta Yoshishige (d. 1202), whose son Yoshitoshi took "Satomi" as his surname.

== Awa Satomi clan ==
After the fall of the Kamakura shogunate in 1333, the Kantō region was high unstable due to incessant conflict between the Kantō kubō under Ashikaga Shigeuji based in Kamakura and the Ashikaga shogunate, represented by the Kantō Kanrei under Uesugi Noritada. The minor lords of Awa Province (present-day southern Chiba Prefecture ) were loyal to the Kanrei, but geographically, the province was very near Kamakura, separated only by the narrow Uraga Channel. To seize Awa Province, the Kantō kubō sent the Satomi clan under Satomi Yoshizane (1412-1488), who landed at Shirahama from which he gradually expanded to conquer the province. Satomi Yoshizane claimed to be the chieftain of the Satomi clan, but his ancestry is somewhat uncertain. His descendants are known as at the "Awa Satomi clan", and cadet branches of the clan existed in Dewa, Echigo, and Mino Province.

In 1516, Odawara-based Hōjō clan defeated the Miura clan and seized Miura Peninsula, opposite of Uraga Channel from Awa Province. Furthermore, the Hōjō expanded northward along Tokyo Bay, capturing Edo Castle by 1524. This threatened the Satomi clan from west and north. In response, Satomi Yoshitoyo launched an amphibious invasion of Kamakura, in the process of which his forces burned down the famed Shinto shrine of Tsurugaoka Hachiman-gu. This was a massive loss of prestige for Yoshitoyo, and led to an internal conflict within the Satomi clan. Satomi Sanetaka, head of a cadet branch of the clan attempted a coup d'état with Hōjō assistance in 1533, but the attempt failed and he was killed. Yoshitoyo then attacked Sanetaka's son, Satomi Yoshitaka, but Yoshitaka escaped and together with the Hōjō and a strong navy, he managed to drive out Yoshitoyo and seize power the following year. He then broke his alliance with the Hōjō and revived the ancient feud between the clans. Soon afterwards, Satomi Yoshitaka seized Kazusa Province and from his base at Kururi Castle turned his attention to Shimōsa Province. Meanwhile, the Hōjō has taken control of Musashi Province to the north of Shimōsa. The Hōjō were far stronger, and their armies broke the Satomi forces and even attacked Kururi Castle, but Yoshitaka turned to Uesugi Kenshin for assistance and kept his independence. After his death in 1574, Uesugi Kenshin lost all of his territories in the Kantō region and could no longer assist the Satomi. Yoshitaka's son, Satomi Yoshihiro (1530-1578) pledged fealty to Hōjō Ujitsuna in 1539 and surrendered the northern half of Kazusa Province. The Satomi were involved in the First Battle of Kōnodai (1538) and the Second Battle of Kōnodai (1564). After his death to illness in 1578, a conflict arose between his son, Satomi Yoshishige and his younger brother, Satomi Yoshiyori. Yoshiyori had the support of the Hōjō and defeated Yoshishige, but the clan was severely weakened. In order to better control commerce and to make better use of their maritime power, he relocated his seat from Kururi to Okamoto Castle.

By 1580, as the situation for clan improved, he built Tateyama Castle. In 1590, Toyotomi Hideyoshi launched a campaign to destroy the Hōjō. Satomi Yoshiyasu quickly attacked the Hōjō strongholds in Kazusa in an arbitrary attempt to recover his former territories. However, as these attacks took place without Hideyoshi's permission or coordination with Toyotomi generals, Hideyoshi was angered, and he subsequently reduced the Satomi clan's holding to only Awa Province. Yoshiyasu relocated his seat from Okamoto to Tateyama Castle. At the beginning of the Edo period the clan was named the daimyō of Awa Province with a kokudaka of 120,000 koku under the Tokugawa shogunate. However, the clan was implicated in the Ōkubo Nagayasu Incident of 1614, and Satomi Tadayoshi (1594–1622) was banished to Hōki Province (present-day Tottori Prefecture), and had his holdings reduced to 30,000 koku. Tadayoshi had no heir, and the clan died out with his death.

== Satomi clan castle ruins ==
In 2012, the ruins of two early castles in southern Bōsō Peninsula, Inamura Castle and Okamoto Castle were collectively designated a National Historic Site under the name Satomi clan castle ruins (里見氏城跡, Satomi-shi shiro ato).

The original Tateyama Castle was allowed to fall into ruins upon the attainder of Tateyama Domain in the death of Satomi Tadayoshi in 1622. Although the domain was restored in 1781 under Inaba Masaaki, he was not permitted to rebuild the castle, but only to construct a jinya fortified residence. The current tenshu is a 1982 reconstruction intended to boost local tourism and to function as an annex to the local Tateyama City Museum.

== Notable members of the Satomi clan ==
- Satomi Sanetaka
- Satomi Yoshitoyo
- Satomi Yoshitaka
- Satomi Yoshihiro
- Satomi Yoshiyori
- Satomi Yoshiyasu
- Satomi Tadayoshi
