= Inaba (disambiguation) =

Inaba is a Japanese surname.

Inaba may also refer to:

- Inaba clan, a Japanese samurai clan
- Inaba Province, an old province of Japan in the area that is today the eastern part of Tottori Prefecture
- Mount Kinka (Gifu), previously named Mount Inaba
- Hare of Inaba, a Japanese myth
- Inaba, a Japanese long-distance sleeper train connecting Tokyo and Yonago that was discontinued in October 1978
- Inaba, a fictional town and setting for the video game Persona 4
