= Tottori College =

Coordinates: 35°27′22″N 133°51′34″E

- 鳥取短期大学
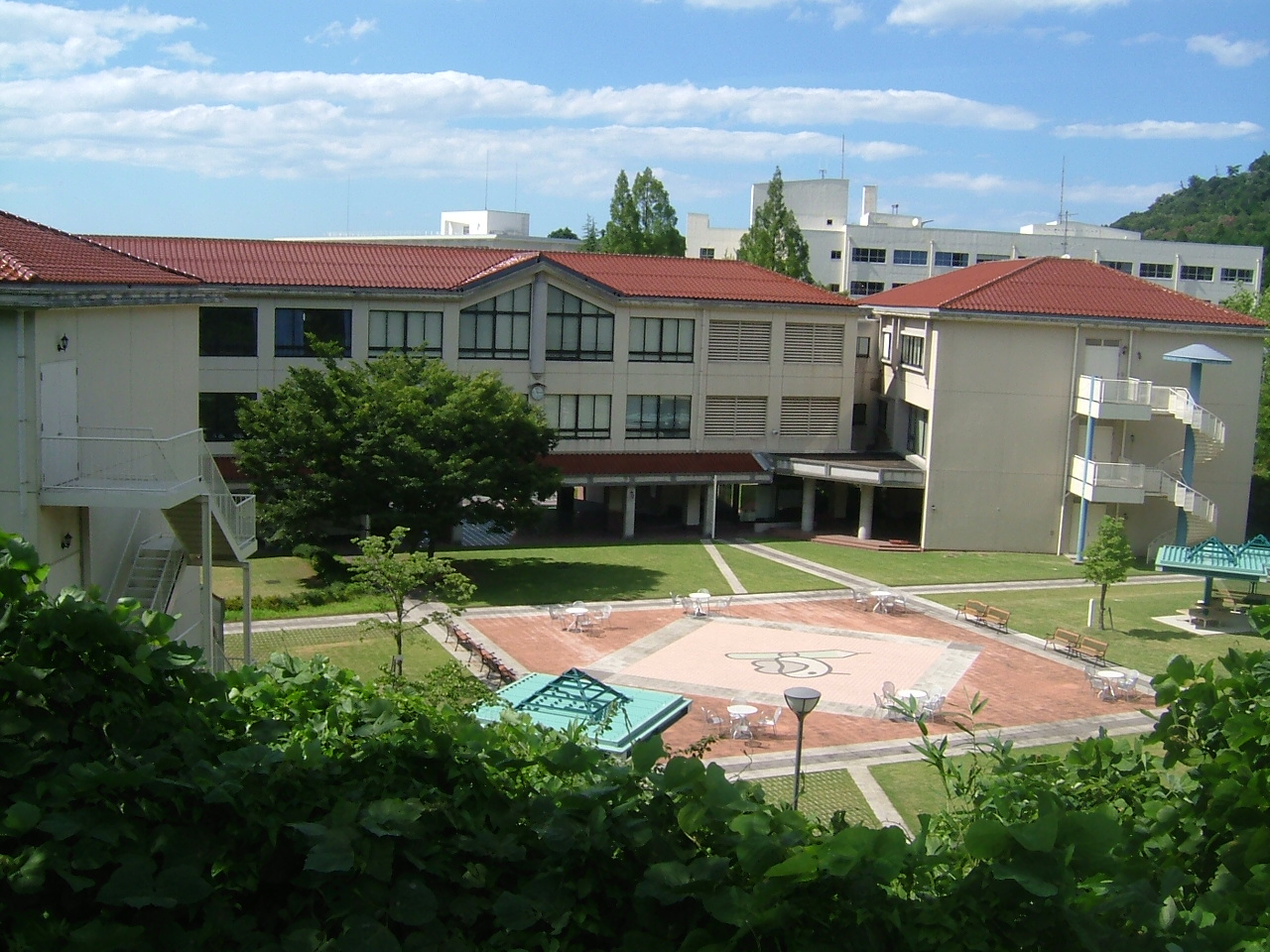
- Image of the college in 2015
- Kurayoshi, Tottori‚ Japan

Information
- Other name: Toritan
- School type: Private junior college
- Established: 1971
- Gender: Co-educational (since 2001)
- Website: www.cygnus.ac.jp

Tottori College (鳥取短期大学, Tottori tanki daigaku) is a private junior college in Kurayoshi, Tottori, Japan. Founded in 1971 as a junior women's college, it became coeducational in 2001. The nickname of the school is Toritan.
