= Tateyama Domain =

Tateyama Domain 館山藩
- under Tokugawa shogunate Japan
- 1590–1871
- Capital: Tateyama Castle (until 1614); Tateyama jin'ya (since 1614)
  - Type: Daimyō
- Historical era: Edo period
  - Established: 1590
  - Disestablished: 1871
- Today part of: part of Chiba Prefecture

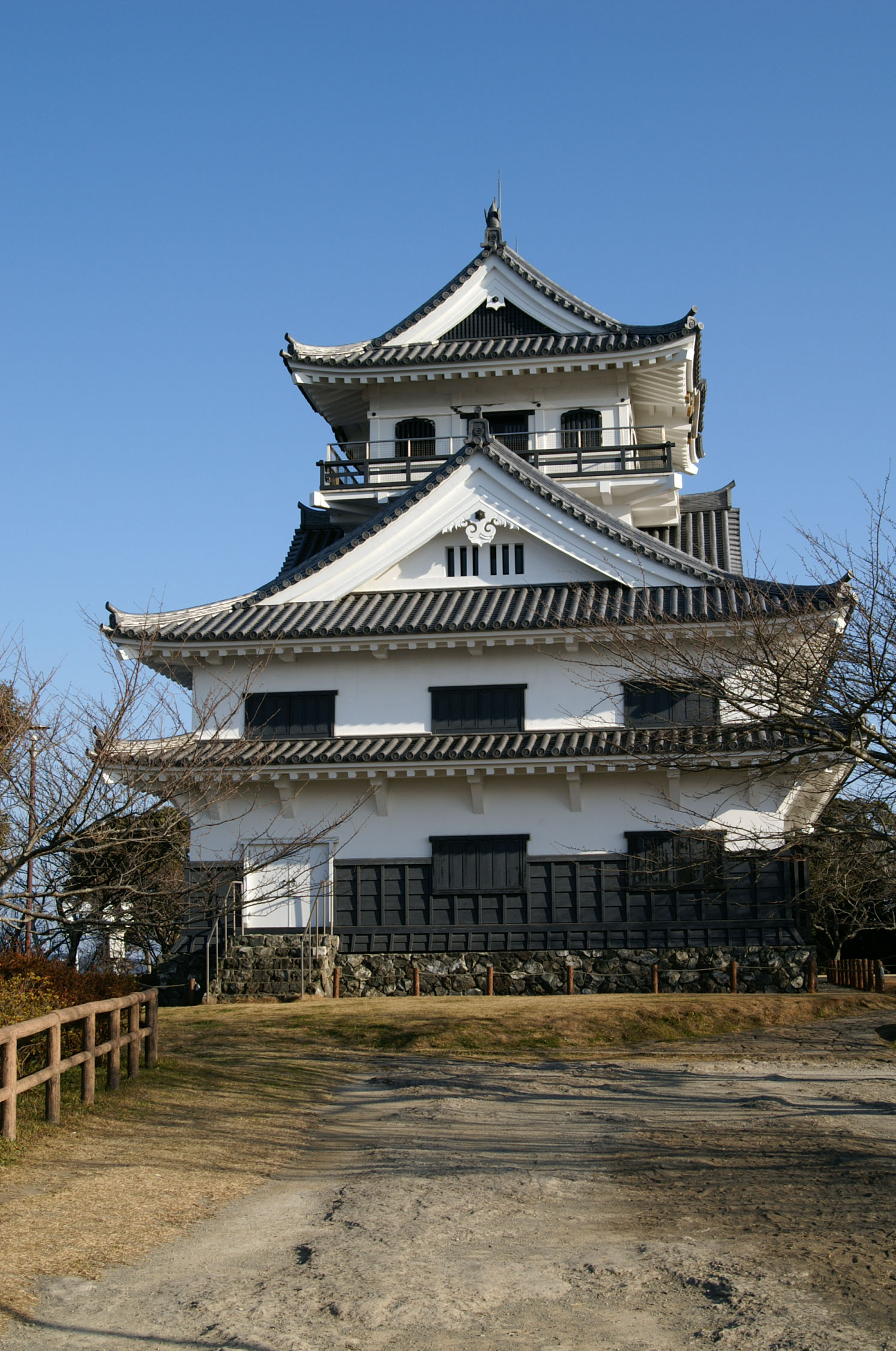
reconstruction of Tateyama Castle, administrative center of Tateyama Domain

Tateyama Domain (館山藩, Tateyama-han) was a feudal domain under the Tokugawa shogunate of Edo period Japan, located in Awa Province (southern modern-day Chiba Prefecture), Japan. It was centered on Tateyama Castle in what is now the city of Tateyama, Chiba.

== History ==
Most of the Bōsō Peninsula was controlled by the powerful Satomi clan during the Sengoku period. The Satomi fought numerous battles with the Later Hōjō clan of Odawara for control of the Kantō region. In 1580, Satomi Yoriyoshi built Tateyama Castle in southern Awa Province to guard the southern portion of his territories and increase his control over the entrance to Edo Bay. The castle of rebuilt by his son, Satomi Yoshiyasu in 1588.

Following the Battle of Odawara in 1590, Toyotomi Hideyoshi assigned the Kantō region to Tokugawa Ieyasu, who confirmed the Satomi as daimyō of Awa and Kazusa Provinces, with revenues of 92,000 koku. Following the Battle of Sekigahara, Satomi Yoshiyasu also gained control of Kashima District in Hitachi Province, which increased his holdings to 122,000 koku. After his death in 1603, the domain was inherited by his son, Satomi Tadayoshi. However, Tadayoshi was related by marriage to Ōkubo Tadachika, and was implicated in the Ōkubo Nagayasu Incident of 1614, which the Tokugawa shogunate used as excuse to abolish Tateyama Domain.

On September 18, 1781, Shōgun Tokugawa Ieharu, at the recommendation of his senior councilor Tanuma Okitsugu granted a 3000 koku holding in southern Awa Province to his page Inaba Masaaki, which, when added to his existing 2000 koku in Awa, and 5000 koku in Kazusa and Hitachi provinces, raised him to the status of a daimyō. He rebuilt Tateyama Castle, and his descendants ruled over the revived Tateyama Domain until the Meiji Restoration.

During the Bakumatsu period, Inaba Masami served in several important posts within the administration of the Tokugawa shogunate. However, with the Boshin War, he went into retirement, and his successor Inaba Masayoshi, pledged loyalty to the new Meiji government. However, in response, the Tokugawa navy, under Enomoto Takeaki invaded Tateyama, and used it as a base to attack Satchō Alliance forces in Kazusa Province. After the end of the conflict, with the abolition of the han system in July 1871, Tateyama Domain became Tateyama Prefecture, which merged with the short-lived Kisarazu Prefecture in November 1871, which later became part of Chiba Prefecture.

The domain had a population of 23,202 people in 3526 households per a census in 1869.

== Holdings at the end of the Edo period ==
As with most domains in the han system, Tateyama Domain consisted of several discontinuous territories calculated to provide the assigned kokudaka, based on periodic cadastral surveys and projected agricultural yields.

- Awa Province
  - 11 villages in Nagasa District
  - 2 villages in Asai District
  - 4 villages in Hei District
  - 29 villages in Awa District
- Kazusa Province
  - 1 village in Ichihara District
  - 4 villages in Nagara District
- Shimōsa Province
  - 2 villages in Katori District

== List of daimyōs ==
#	Name	Tenure	Courtesy title	Court Rank	kokudaka
Satomi clan (tozama) 1590–1614
1	Satomi Yoshiyasu (里見義康)	1590–1603	Awa-no-kami (安房守)	Lower 4th (従四位下)	121,000 koku
2	Satomi Tadayoshi (里見忠義)	1603–1614	Awa-no-kami (安房守)	Lower 4th (従四位下)	121,000 koku
	tenryō	1614–1781			
Inaba clan (fudai) 1781–1871
1	Inaba Masaaki (稲葉 正明)	1781–1789	Echizen-no-kami (越前守)	Lower 5th (従五位下)	10,000→13,000 koku
2	Inaba Masatake (稲葉 正武)	1789–1812	Harima-no-kami (播磨守)	Lower 5th (従五位下)	13,000→10,000 koku
3	Inaba Masamori (稲葉正盛)	1812–1819	Harima-no-kami (播磨守)	Lower 5th (従五位下)	10,000 koku
4	Inaba Masami (稲葉 正巳)	1820–1864	Hyobu-no-taifu (兵部大輔)	Lower 4th (従四位下)	10,000 koku
5	Inaba Masayoshi (稲葉 正善)	1864–1871	Bingo-no-kami (備後守)	Lower 5th (従五位下)	10,000 koku
