= Hitachi-no-Kuni Sōshagū =

Shinto shrine in Ibaraki prefecture, Japan

Coordinates: 36.1878°N 140.2690°E

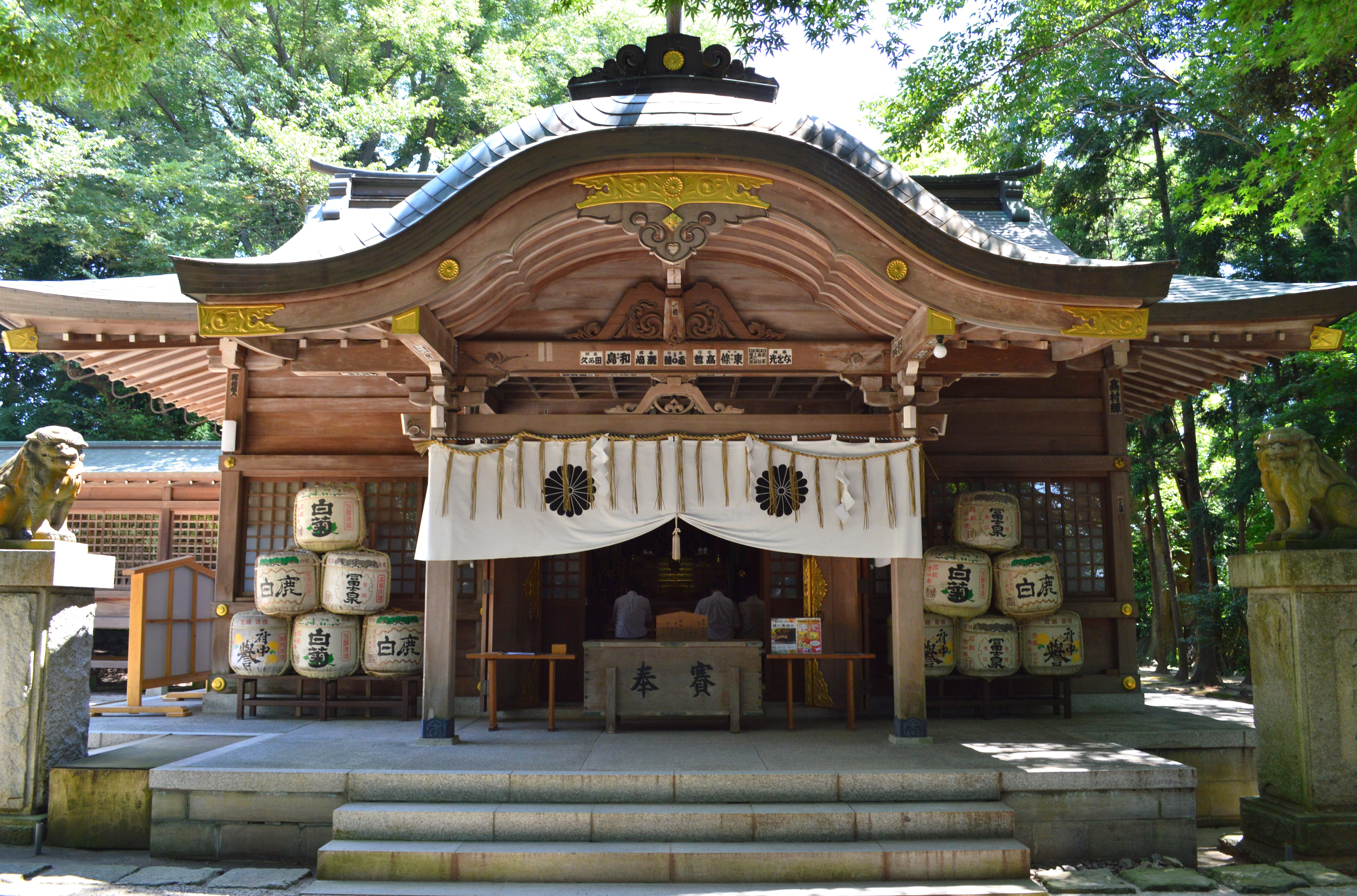

Religion
- Affiliation: Shinto
- Interactive map of Hitachi-no-Kuni Sōshagū

Hitachinokuni Sōshagū (常陸國總社宮, Hitachinokuni sōshagu, also 常陸国総社宮 and 總社神社) is a Shinto shrine located in Ishioka, Ibaraki Prefecture, Japan. According to legend, it was founded in the Tenpyō period, c. 729-749.

It is a Sōja or a shrine dedicated to enshrining all the kami of Hitachi Province. As a result it, alongside Kashima Shrine (Hitachi Ichinomiya) were the two main shrines of Hitachi Province

== Enshrined deities ==
It enshrines the kami Izanagi (伊弉諾尊), Ōkuninushi (大国主尊), Susanoo-no-Mikoto (素戔嗚尊), Ninigi-no-Mikoto (瓊々杵尊), Omiyanome (大宮比売尊), and Futsunomitama (布留大神).

== See also ==
- List of Shinto shrines in Japan
- Kashima Shrine (Hitachi Province Ichinomiya)
