= Shizuoka Sengen Shrine =

Shinto shrine in Shizuoka, Japan

Shizuoka Sengen Jinja 静岡浅間神社
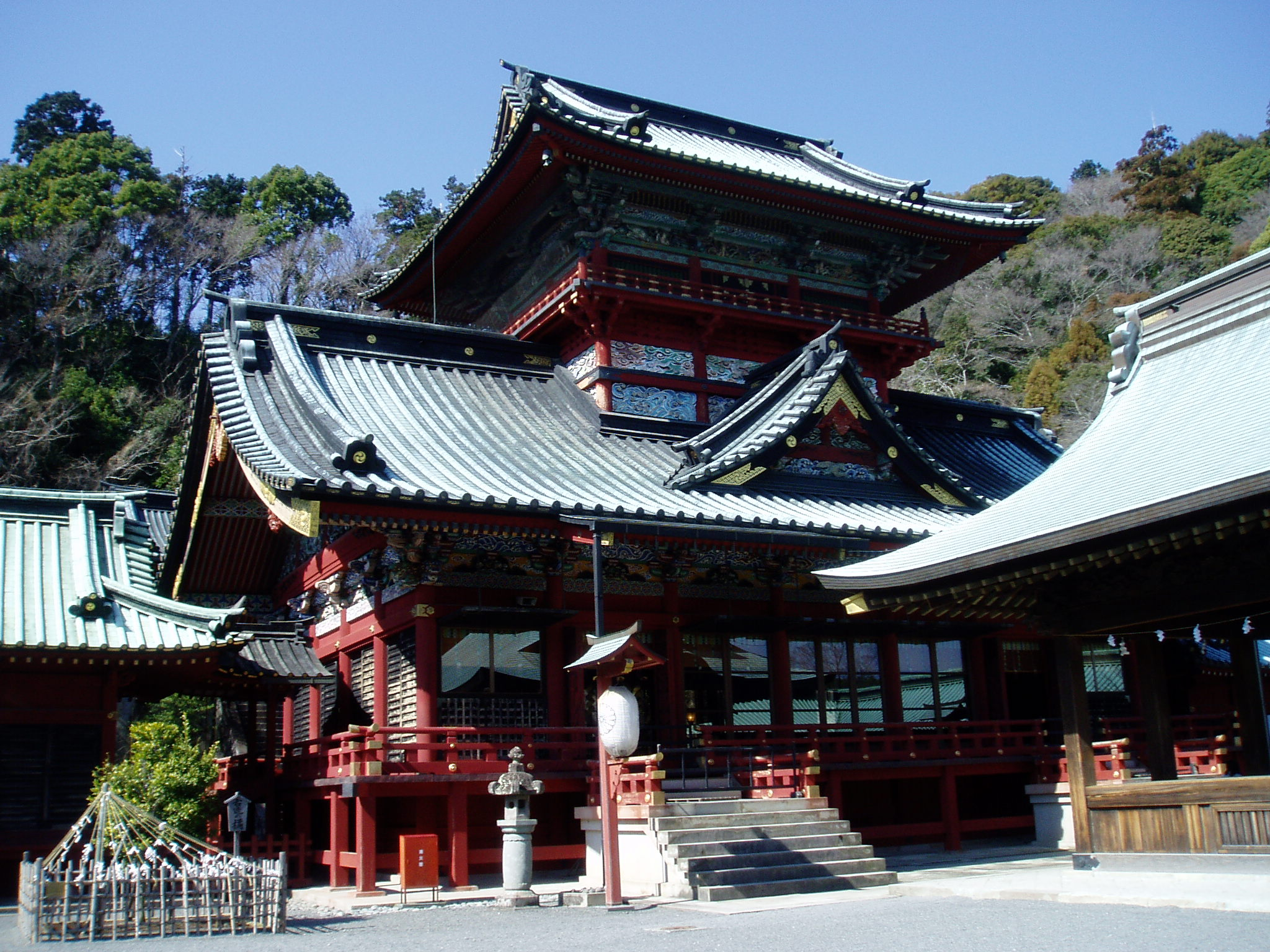
- Prayer Hall of Shizuoka Sengen Jinja

- Location within Shizuoka Prefecture Location within Japan

Religion
- Affiliation: Shinto
- Deity: Ohnamuchi-no-Mikoto; Konohanasakuya-hime, Ōtoshimioya-no-Mikoto
- Type: Asama shrine

Location
- Location: 102-1 Miyagasaki-chō, Aoi-ku, Shizuoka, 420-0868
- Interactive map of Shizuoka Sengen Jinja 静岡浅間神社
- Coordinates: 34°59′01″N 138°22′31″E

Website
- www.shizuokasengen.net

Shizuoka Sengen Jinja (静岡浅間神社) is the name for a collective group of three Shinto shrines now forming a single religious corporation, located at Mount Shizuhata in Aoi-ku, Shizuoka, in Shizuoka Prefecture, Japan. These shrines are the Kanbe Jinja (神部神社), Asama Jinja (浅間神社), and Ōtoshimioya Jinja (大歳御祖神社). The main festival of the shrine is held annually on April 5.

It is the sōja shrine of Suruga Province.

== Enshrined kami ==
The primary kami of Kanbe Jinja is Ōnamuchi-no-Mikoto, who is regarded as the mythical founding deity of Suruga Province.

The primary kami of Asama Jinja is Konohanasakuya-hime, the deity of Mount Fuji.

The primary kami of Ōtoshimioya Jinja is Ōtoshimioya-no-Mikoto (大歳御祖命), who appears in the Kojiki as a wife of Susanoo and a kami protecting markets and commerce.

== History ==
The date of Shizuoka Sengen Jinja's foundation is unknown. The area has been inhabited since prehistoric times, and a Kofun period burial mound has been excavated at Mount Shizuhata. Per the Nihon Shoki, the area was colonized by the Hata clan during this period. According to unsubstantiated shrine legend, the foundation of the Kanbe Jinja dates to the reign of Emperor Sujin, that of the Ōtoshimioya Jinja to the reign of Emperor Ōjin, both from the Kofun period.

Per the Engishiki records, Kanbe Jinja was given national recognition and status of the Sōja of Suruga Province in the Heian period. Also, the date of 901 is given for the foundation of Asama Jinja, as a subsidiary branch of the Fujisan Hongū Sengen Taisha, and initially was referred to as the "Shingu" (new shrine).

Through the Kamakura and Muromachi periods, the shrines enjoyed the patronage of the powerful warrior clans who dominated the Suruga area: the Minamoto clan, Hōjō clan, Imagawa clan, Takeda clan and the Tokugawa clan. In particular, the first Tokugawa shōgun, Tokugawa Ieyasu, sponsored the rebuilding of the shrines after his retirement to nearby Sumpu Castle, and subsequent shōguns continued to worship at the shrines throughout the Edo period. The 3rd shōgun, Tokugawa Iemitsu, granted the shrines lands with 2313 koku in revenue for their upkeep. However, the shrine complex burned down in a fire of 1804. It was rebuilt over a 60-year period at a cost of over 100,000 gold ryō by the Tokugawa shogunate in its flamboyant Momoyama style, with extensive use of lacquer, wood carvings, and gold leaf. Today, 26 structures in the shrine complex are protected by the national government as Important Cultural Properties, forming one of the largest such complexes in the country.

During the 19th century, Shinto priest Nagasawa Katsutate attended the middle teaching institute (中教院, chūkyōin) at Asama Jinja when he was a teenager.

In the modern system of ranked Shinto Shrines, Shizuoka Sengen was listed among the 3rd class of nationally significant shrines or kokuhei-shōsha (国幣小社).

== Subsidiary shrines ==
In addition to the three main shrines, the Shizuoka Sengen Jinja complex also has four subsidiary shrines:

- Hayama Jinja (麓山神社) dedicated to Ōyamatsumi-no-Mikoto and to Yamato Takeru. It was founded in 1878
- Yachiho Jinja (八千戈神社), an amalgamation of 18 small shrines and 13 small chapels found in the surrounding area. It was founded in 1873.
- Sukunahiko Jinja (少彦名神社), formerly the Yakushi-do of Kambe Jinja, turned into a shrine in Meiji period due to separation of Buddhism from Shinto.
- Tamahoko Jinja (玉鉾神) dedicated to the four main Edo period kokugaku scholars.

== Cultural properties ==
Today, 26 structures in the shrine complex are protected by the national government as Important Cultural Properties (ICP), forming one of the largest such complexes in the country.

The shrine has a small museum, which displays finds from the Shizuhatayama Kofun archaeological site, artifacts pertaining to Tokugawa Ieyasu and the history of the shrine, as well as the shrine's non-structural ICPs, including a Muromachi-period tachi Japanese sword and 17 diagrams of the shrine prior to its late Edo-period rebuilding.

== See also ==
- List of Shinto shrines
- Fujisan Hongū Sengen Taisha (Suruga Province Ichinomiya)
