= Inamura Castle =

Japanese castle located in what is now the city of Tateyama

- 稲村城
- Tateyama, Chiba Prefecture, Japan

Site information
- Type: Hirayama-style Japanese castle
- Condition: ruins

Location
- Inamura Castle Inamura Castle (Japan)
- Coordinates: 34°59′47.2″N 139°54′11.9″E

Site history
- Built: 1489-1491 century
- Built by: Satomi clan
- Demolished: 1534

Inamura Castle (稲村城, Inamura-jō) was a Muromachi period Japanese castle located in what is now the city of Tateyama, Chiba Prefecture, Japan. The ruins have been protected as a National Historic Site since 2012 together with Okamoto Castle as the Satomi clan castle ruins (里見氏城跡, Satomi-shi shiro ato).

== Overview ==
Inamura Castle was located on Shiroyama Hill, at an elevation of 64 meters, overlooking the entrance to Tokyo Bay. The modern city of Tateyama spreads five kilometers to either side of this castle, but when it was built in the Muromachi period, the jōkamachi was a small settlement on the shore near this location. This point was also a crossroads for a road connecting the eastern and western shores of Bōsō Peninsula, and a north-to-south road leading towards Shirahama at the southern tip of the peninsula. The surrounding area was a well-water region suitable for rice cultivation and was near the ancient provincial capital of Awa Province.

The layout of the castle was in a semicircle across the top of a curved ridge with a total length of up to 500 meters, making it by far the largest castle in Awa Province. The inner bailey was trapezoidal with a length of about 50 meters long, and protected by clay ramparts. Surrounding were many terraces constructed at various levels on the slopes, and protected by dry moats. The entrance into the castle was a complex gate with buffer area.

== History ==
After the fall of the Kamakura shogunate in 1333, the Kantō region was high unstable due to incessant conflict between the Kantō kubō under Ashikaga Shigeuji based in Kamakura and the Ashikaga shogunate, represented by the Kantō Kanrei under Uesugi Noritada. The minor lords of Awa Province were loyal to the Kanrei, but geographically, the province was very near Kamakura, separated only by the narrow Uraga Channel. To seize Awa Province, the Kantō kubō sent the Satomi clan under Satomi Yoshizane (1412-1488), who landed at Shirahama where he built Shirahama Castle. He gradually expanded from this bridgehead to conquer the province. By the end of the 15th century, the Satomi were firmly in control, and construction of Inamura Castle began in 1486 and was completed after his death in 1491, but these dates are not confirmed.

In 1516, Odawara-based Hōjō clan defeated the Miura clan and seized Miura Peninsula, opposite of Uraga Channel from Awa Province. Furthermore, the Hōjō expanded northward along Tokyo Bay, capturing Edo Castle by 1524. This threatened the Satomi clan from both the west and the north. In response, Satomi Yoshitoyo launched an amphibious invasion of Kamakura, in the process of which his forces burned down the famed Shinto shrine of Tsurugaoka Hachiman-gu. This was a massive loss of prestige for Yoshitoyo, and led to an internal conflict within the Satomi clan. Satomi Sanetaka, head of a cadet branch of the clan attempted a coup d'état with Hōjō assistance in 1533, but the attempt failed and he was killed. Yoshitoyo then attacked Sanetaka's son, Satomi Yoshitaka, but Yoshitaka escaped and together with the Hōjō and a strong navy, he managed to drive out Yoshitoyo and seize power the following year. Inamura Castle was abolished around this time.

No buildings or structures of the castle remains today. The site of the castle is currently being preserved and maintained by the local Inamura Castle Preservation Society, but there are no public facilities. The site is about a 10-minute walk from Kokonoe Station on the JR East Uchibo Line.

== See also ==
- List of Historic Sites of Japan (Chiba)

== Literature ==
- Schmorleitz, Morton S. (1974). Castles in Japan. Tokyo: Charles E. Tuttle Co. pp. 144–145. ISBN 0-8048-1102-4.
- Motoo, Hinago (1986). Japanese Castles. Tokyo: Kodansha. p. 200 pages. ISBN 0-87011-766-1.
- Mitchelhill, Jennifer (2004). Castles of the Samurai: Power and Beauty. Tokyo: Kodansha. p. 112 pages. ISBN 4-7700-2954-3.
- Turnbull, Stephen (2003). Japanese Castles 1540-1640. Osprey Publishing. p. 64 pages. ISBN 1-84176-429-9.
