= Shizuhatagayama Kofun =

Shizuhatayama Kofun
- 賤機山古墳 (Japanese)
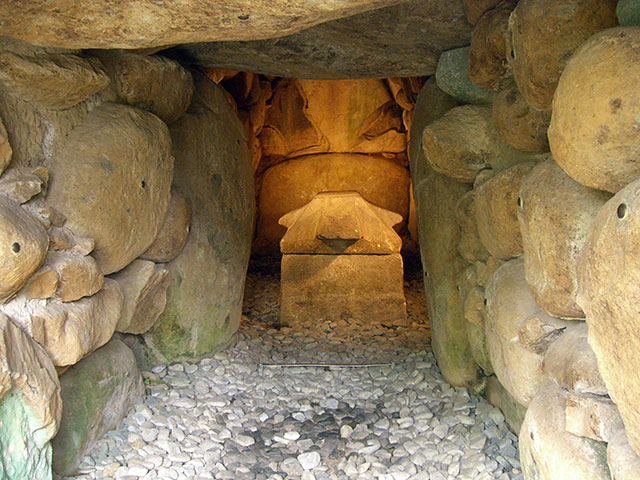
- Interior of the Shizuhatayama Kofun

- Shizuhatayama Kofun Shizuhatagayama Kofun (Japan)
- 34°58′58.3″N 138°22′29.9″E
- Type: kofun
- Periods: Kofun period
- Location: Aoi-ku, Shizuoka, Japan
- Region: Tōkai region

History
- Built: 6th century AD

Site notes
- Public access: Yes (museum at site)

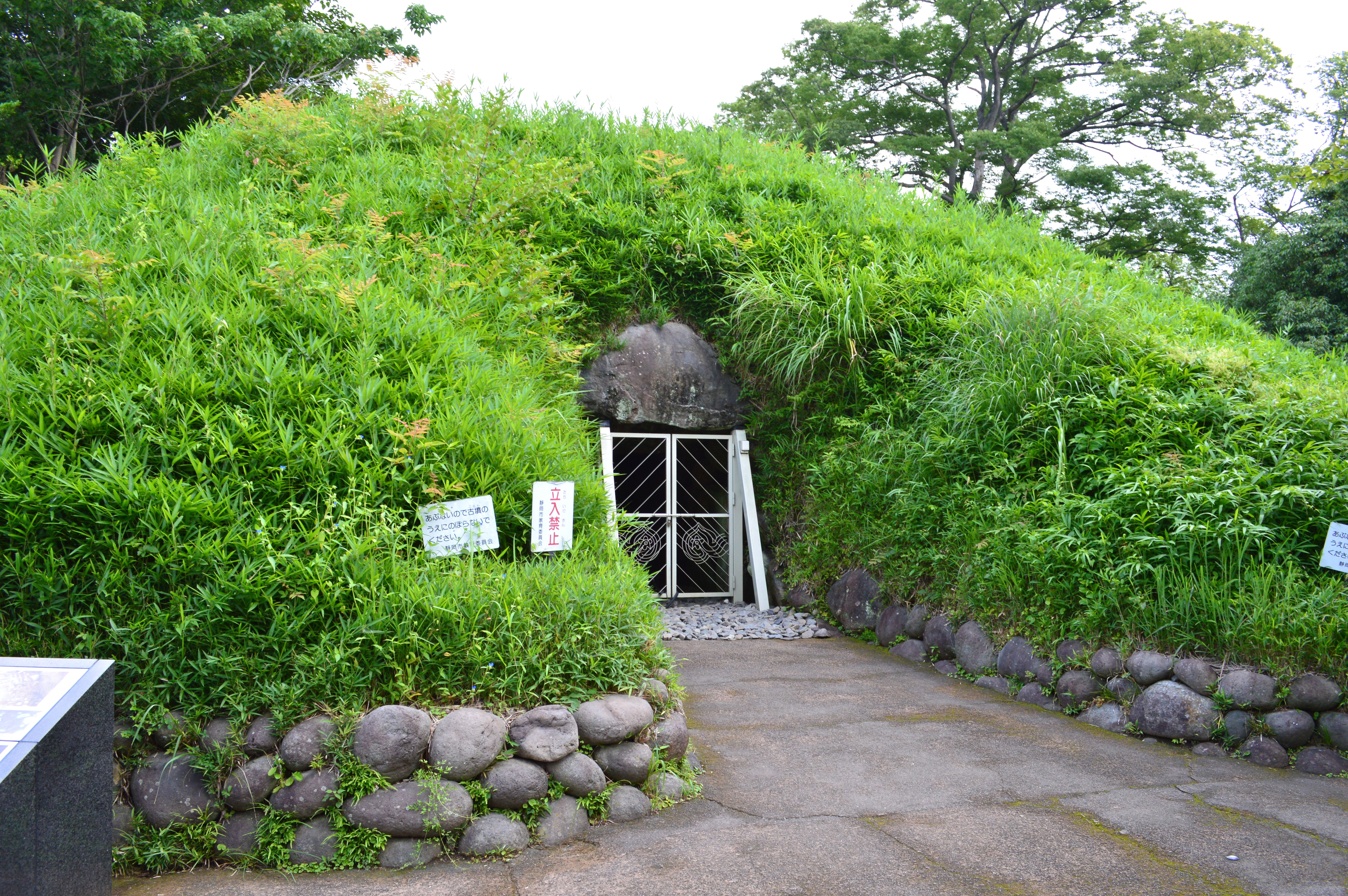
exterior

Shizuhatayama Kofun (賤機山古墳) is a dome-shaped kofun burial mound located within the grounds of the Shizuoka Sengen Shrine complex in Aoi-ku, Shizuoka, Japan. in the Tōkai region of Japan. The site was designated a National Historic Site of Japan in 1953.

== Overview ==
The Shizuhatayama Kofun is located on a 50-meter hilltop immediately behind the Honden of the Ohtoshimioya Shrine within the Shizuoka Sengen Jinja complex. Its existence has been known since ancient times and Edo period documents indicate that the burial chamber was exposed after a tree fell in a storm during the Tenmei or Bunsei era. The first modern archaeological excavations were conducted in 1949 and 1955, at which time the structure of tumulus was found to consist of a stone dome, approximately 32 meters in diameter and seven meters in height. There was no evidence of fukiishi or haniwa. Within is a horizontal chamber of cut stones with a length of 6.5 meters, height of 2.3 meters and width of 1.8 meters. A rock-lined tunnel 18.2 meters long connects the burial chamber to an opening in the hillside, orientated to the south. Some 600 head-sized boulders from the nearby Abe River were used in its construction.

The burial chamber contains a house-shaped 2.9 meter stone sarcophagus made of tuff from the Izu Peninsula. The lid had eight protrusions for hanging ropes, three on each side and one each on the head and foot. Although pillaged in pre-modern times, the burial chamber was found to contain numerous shards of Haji ware and Sue ware, and remnants of armor, swords and bronze horse fittings were found within the sarcophagus, indicating that the burial dates from around the 6th century AD. The name or rank of the person buried in the tomb is unknown and no human remains were discovered. The site came under government protection in 1953, and many of the artifacts uncovered are displayed at the Shizuoka City Cultural Property Museum (静岡市文化財資料館, Shizuoka-shi bunkazai shiryōkan) within the grounds of the Shizuoka Sengen Shrine.

== See also ==
- List of Historic Sites of Japan (Shizuoka)
- Shizuoka Sengen Shrine
