= Araki Shrine =

Shinto shrine in Shimane

Coordinates: 34.674°N 133.8537°E

- 有木神社

Religion
- Affiliation: Shinto
- Deity: all the deities of Oki Province, Oyamakui no Kami, Takemikazuchi, Ōkuninushi, Ukanomitama, Itsutamawake (逸玉男命), Izanami
- Type: Sōja shrine

Location
- Interactive map of Araki Shrine

Araki Shrine (有木神社) is a Sōja shrine in Okinoshima, Shimane. It enshrines all the kami of the shrines in Oki Province.

Ichinomiya and Soja are not the same thing but were sometimes combined.

== See also ==
- Ichinomiya
- Oki Province Ichinomiya
  - Mizuwakasu Shrine
  - Yurahime Shrine
- Tamawakasumikoto Jinja the other Sōja shrine of the province
