= Inaba Masami =

Japanese daimyō

Inaba Masami 稲葉正巳
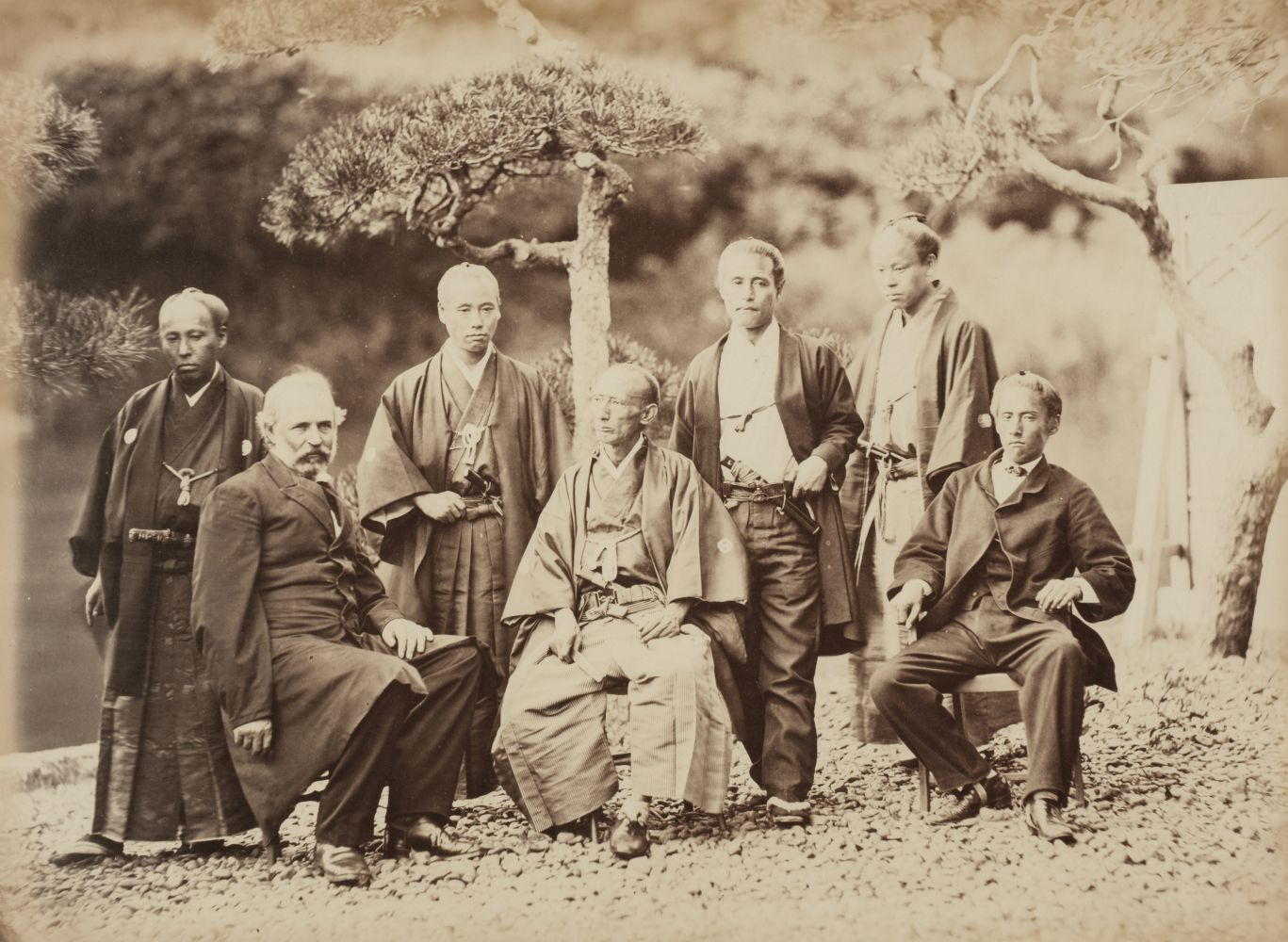
- Photograph by Charles Leander Weed (1867). In the center is Inaba Masami. The other men from the right to the left side are: Ozeki Masuhiro, Matsudaira Tarō, Katsu Kaishu, Ishikawa Jukei, Robert B. Van Valkenburgh (US envoy), Ezure Akinori (foreign service).
- Born: November 15, 1815
- Died: September 16, 1879 (aged 63)
- Other names: Hyōbu-daisuke
- Occupations: Daimyō; Wakadoshiyori, Rōjū

Inaba Masami (稲葉 正巳; November 15, 1815 – September 16, 1879) was daimyō of Tateyama Domain during late-Edo period Japan.

== Biography ==
Inaba Masami was the eldest son of the previous daimyō of Tateyama Domain, Inaba Masamori. On his father's death in 1820, he succeeded to the head of the Tateyama Inaba clan and the position of daimyō of Tateyama. In 1862, he was appointed as a Wakadoshiyori in the administration of the Tokugawa shogunate under Shōgun Tokugawa Iemochi. He resigned the title in 1864, with instructions to strengthen Japan's naval defenses against the increasing aggressive incursions of foreign black ships, and supported Katsu Kaishū’s efforts to create the Kobe Naval Training Center. He was reappointed as a Wakadoshiyori in 1865, and rose to the positions of Rōjū, Commissioner of the Army and Fleet Admiral of the Tokugawa Navy under Shōgun Tokugawa Yoshinobu. He held these posts until 1868. However, with the start of the Boshin War, he refused to take an active role against the Satchō Alliance and went into retirement at Tateyama Castle, turning the domain over to his son Inaba Masayoshi. He died in 1879.

Inaba Masami was married to a daughter of Suwa Tadamichi, daimyō of Suwa Domain in Shinano Province.

Preceded by Inaba Masamori	Daimyō of Tateyama; 1820–1864	Succeeded by Inaba Masayoshi
