= Inaba Masayoshi =

Japanese noble

- 稲葉正善
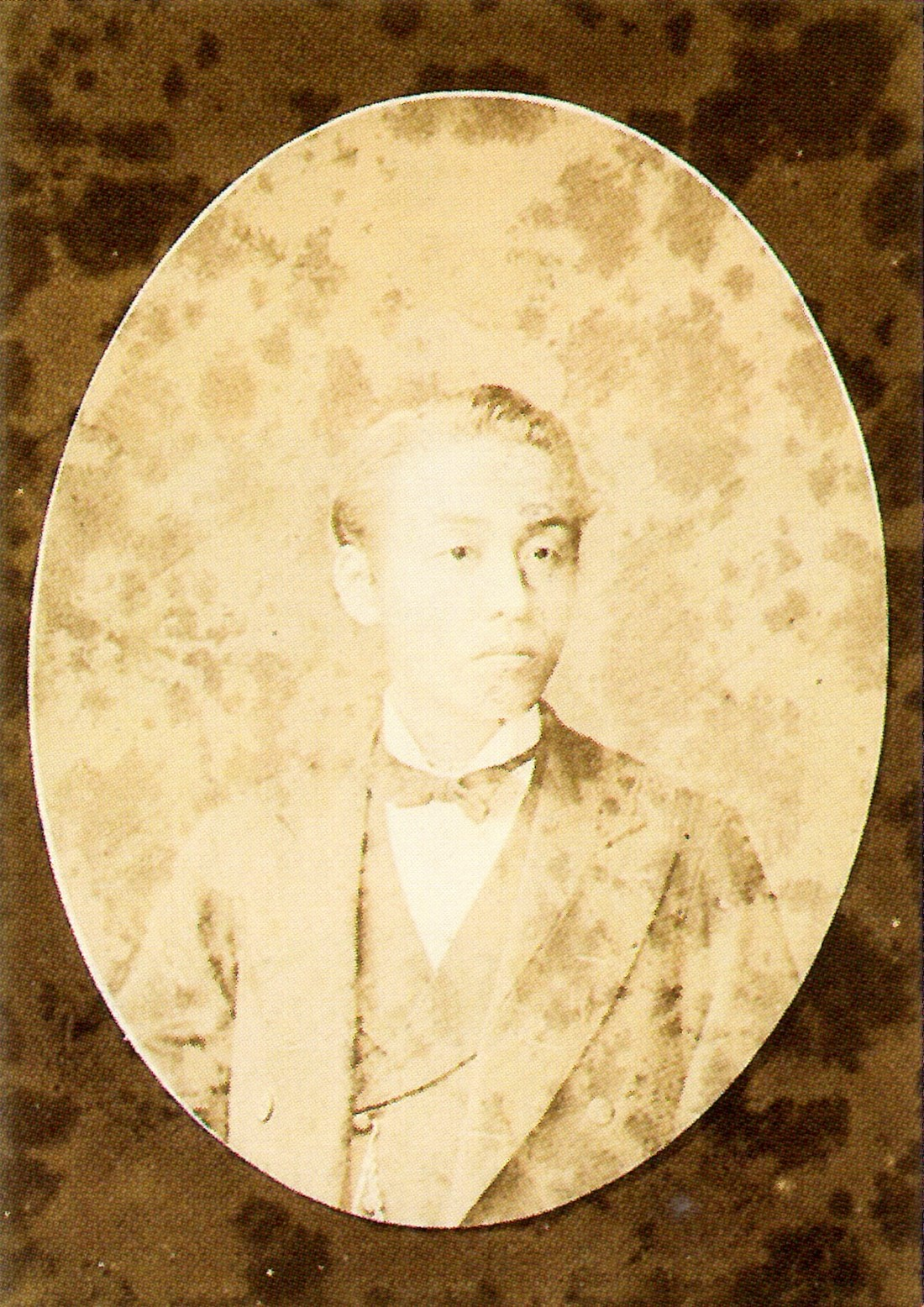
- "Chiba with the Imperial Family x Imperial Family with the Chiba Family", Sannomaru Collection, Imperial Household Agency
- Born: July 28, 1848
- Died: March 19, 1902 (aged 53)
- Other names: Bingo-no-kami
- Occupation: Daimyō

Inaba Masayoshi (稲葉 正善; July 28, 1848 – March 19, 1902) was the final daimyo of Tateyama Domain during Bakumatsu period Japan.

== Biography ==
Inaba Masayoshi was the younger son of Ōoka Tadayuki, the daimyō of Iwatsuki Domain, Musashi Province. He was adopted into the Inaba clan as heir to Inaba Masami, the 4th Inaba daimyō of Tateyama Domain. On his Inaba Masami's retirement from public life in 1864, he succeeded to the head of the Tateyama Inaba clan and the position of daimyō of Tateyama. His immediate task was to reconcile the Domain with the new Meiji government. In 1869, he was confirmed as Domain governor, and upon the abolition of the han system in 1871, governor of the short-lived Tateyama Prefecture. He was subsequently made a viscount (shishaku) under the kazoku peerage system.

Inaba Masayoshi had no heir, adopted and the fourth son of Inaba Hisamichi, the last daimyō of Usuki Domain in Bungo Province to carry on the Inaba name.

| Preceded by Inaba Masami | Daimyō of Tateyama; 1864–1871 | Succeeded by none |
