= Tottori Nijisseiki Pear Museum =

- 鳥取二十世紀梨記念館
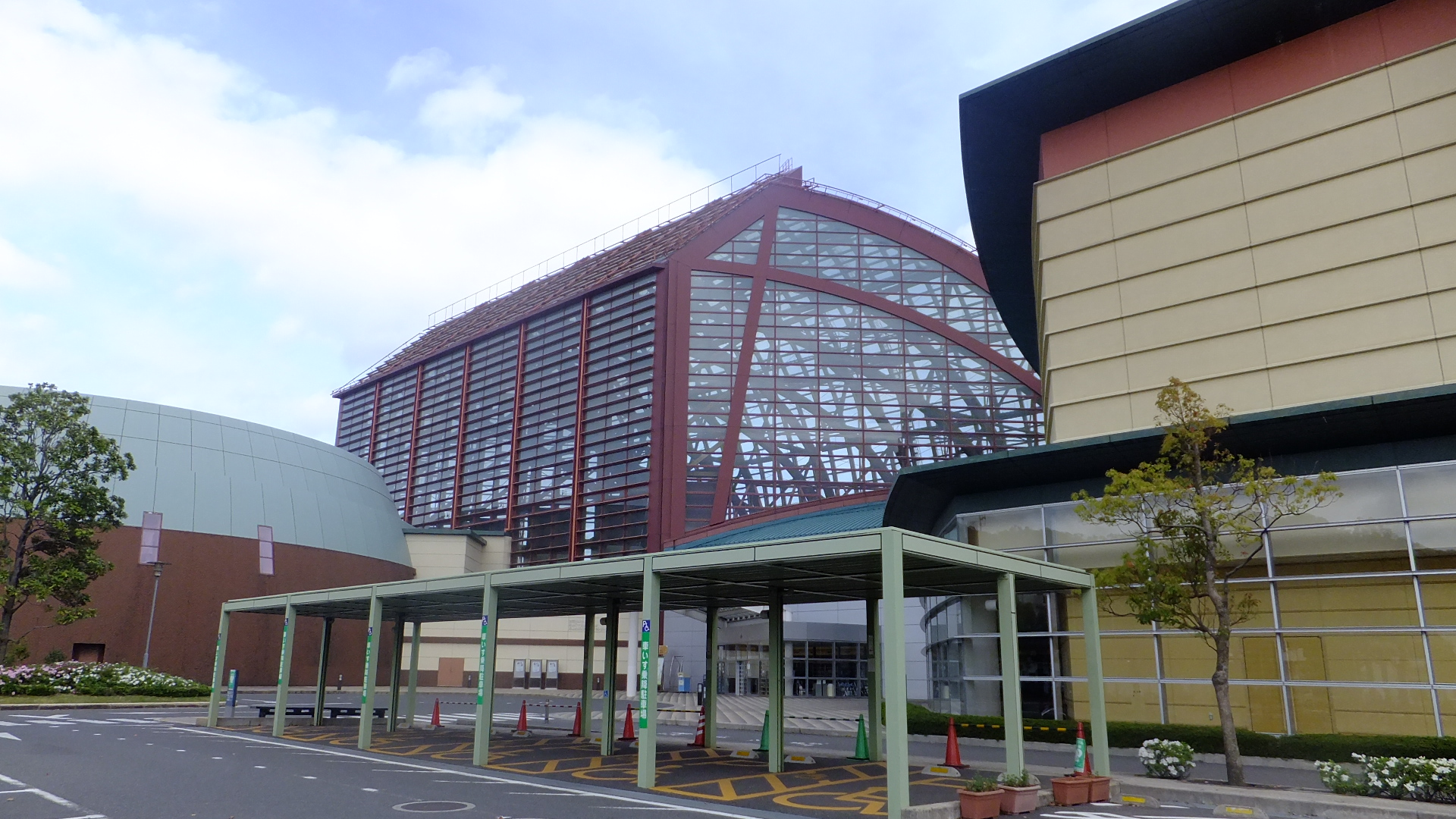

General information
- Location: 198-4, Dakyōji-chō, Kurayoshi, Tottori Prefecture, Japan
- Coordinates: 35°25′54″N 133°50′11″E

Website
- homepage (jp)

The Tottori Nijisseiki Pear Museum (鳥取二十世紀梨記念館, Tottori Nijisseiki Nashi Kinenkan) is located in Kurayoshi, Tottori Prefecture, Japan, and dedicated to the history of the pear. Nashi are cultivated in the prefecture and are one of its mascots.

== See also ==
- Nashi pear
- List of food and beverage museums
