= Inaba Masamori =

Japanese daimyō

Inaba Masamori 稲葉正盛
- Born: June 2, 1769
- Died: January 21, 1820 (aged 28); Osaka
- Other names: Harima-no-kami
- Occupation: Daimyō

Inaba Masamori (稲葉 正盛; November 4, 1791 – January 21, 1820) was daimyō of Tateyama Domain during the late-Edo period Japan.

== Biography ==
Inaba Masamori was the eldest son of the previous daimyō of Tateyama Domain, Inaba Masatake. On the retirement of his father in 1812, he succeeded to the head of the Tateyama Inaba clan and the position of daimyō of Tateyama. However, while assigned to guard duty at Osaka Castle, he fell ill and died. Inaba Masatake was married to a daughter of Honda Tadashige, daimyō of Izumi Domain in Mutsu Province. His grave is at the sub-temple of Rinshō-in within the grounds of Myōshin-ji in Kyoto.

Preceded by Inaba Masatake	Daimyō of Tateyama; 1812-1819	Succeeded by Inaba Masami
