= Inaba Masatake =

Japanese daimyō

Inaba Masatake 稲葉正武
- Born: June 2, 1769
- Died: March 3, 1840 (aged 70)
- Other names: Harima-no-kami
- Occupation: Daimyō

Inaba Masatake (稲葉 正武; June 2, 1769 – August 3, 1840) was daimyō of Tateyama Domain during late-Edo period Japan.

== Biography ==
Inaba Masatake was the fourth son of the previous daimyō of Tateyama Domain, Inaba Masaaki. On the death of his elder brother, Inaba Masanori, in 1788, he was appointed heir. He succeeded to the head of the Tateyama Inaba clan and the position of daimyō of Tateyama on the forced retirement of his father the following year. He is noting for having completed the Tateyama Jin'ya, a fortified residence next to the site of Tateyama Castle, which become the seat of the Tateyama Inaba clan until the Meiji Restoration.

Inaba Masatake was married to a daughter of Tanuma Okitomo, daimyō of Sagara Domain in Suruga Province. He retired from public life in 1812, turning Tateyama Domain over to his son, Inaba Masamori.

Preceded by Inaba Masaaki	Daimyō of Tateyama; 1789-1812	Succeeded by Inaba Masamori
