= Tateyama Castle =

Coordinates: 34°58′53.41″N 139°51′20.44″E

Tateyama Castle 館山城
- Tateyama, Chiba Prefecture, Japan
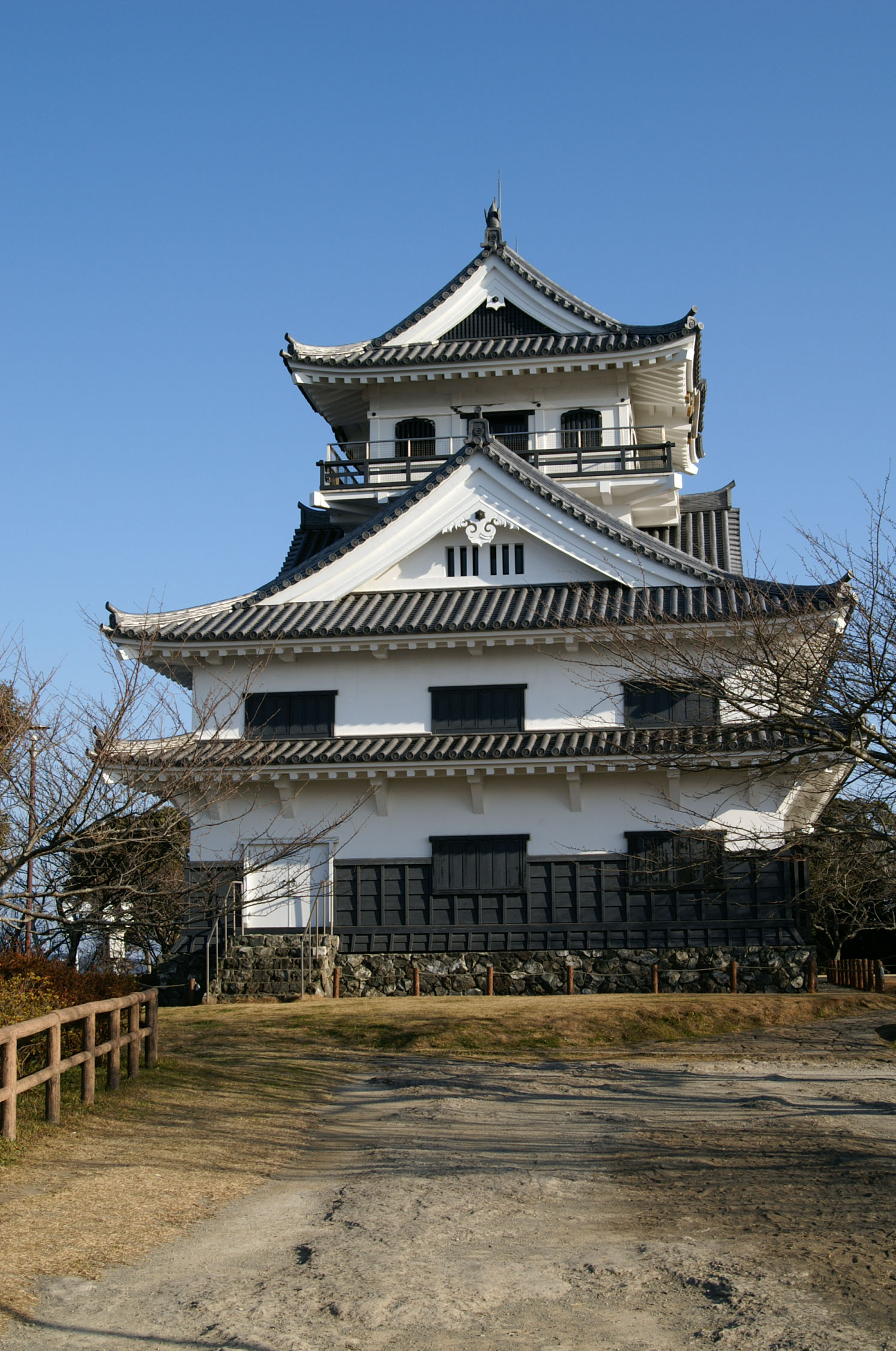
- Reconstructed Main Keep of Tateyama Castle

Site information
- Type: hilltop-style Japanese castle
- Owner: reconstructed 1982
- Open to the public: yes

Location

Site history
- Built: 1580
- Built by: Satomi Yoshiyori
- In use: Edo period
- Demolished: 1614

Tateyama Castle (館山城, Tateyama-jō) is a Japanese castle located in Tateyama, southern Chiba Prefecture, Japan. At the end of the Edo period, Tateyama Castle was home to the Inaba clan, daimyō of Tateyama Domain, but the castle is better known for its association with the former rulers of Awa Province, the Satomi clan. The castle was also known as "Nekoya-jō" (根古屋城).

== History ==
Satomi Yoshiyori, virtually independent lord of all of the Bōsō Peninsula during the Sengoku Period, erected Tateyama Castle in 1580 to guard the entry to Edo Bay and the southern portions of his domains. After the Satomi clan was destroyed by the Tokugawa shogunate in 1614 and Tateyama Domain suppressed, the castle was allowed to fall into ruin.

In 1781, the domain was reinstated, with Inaba Masaaki as the first daimyō of Tateyama Domain under the Inaba clan. He rebuilt the fortifications of the old castle, but apparently did not erect a donjon, as his successor, Inaba Masatake was only allowed to build a jinya fortified residence. The Inaba clan remained in residence at Tateyama until the Meiji Restoration.

The current donjon was reconstructed in 1982 to boost local tourism and to function as an annex to the local Tateyama City Museum. As there are no surviving records indicating the appearance of the original donjon, the current structure was modeled after Inuyama Castle. The interior is devoted primarily to exhibits pertaining to the epic novel Nanso Satomi Hakkenden, by Edo period author Takizawa Bakin.

The surrounding Shiroyama Park (城山公園, Shiroyama-kōen) is a popular local spot for bird-watching, and for sakura blossoms in spring.

== Literature ==
- Schmorleitz, Morton S. (1974). Castles in Japan. Tokyo: Charles E. Tuttle Co. pp. 144–145. ISBN 0-8048-1102-4.
- Motoo, Hinago (1986). Japanese Castles. Tokyo: Kodansha. p. 200 pages. ISBN 0-87011-766-1.
- Mitchelhill, Jennifer (2004). Castles of the Samurai: Power and Beauty. Tokyo: Kodansha. p. 112 pages. ISBN 4-7700-2954-3.
- Turnbull, Stephen (2003). Japanese Castles 1540-1640. Osprey Publishing. p. 64 pages. ISBN 1-84176-429-9.
