= Kazuyo Inaba =

Japanese swimmer

Personal information
- Born: 13 April 1959 (age 67)

Sport
- Sport: Swimming
- Strokes: breaststroke

Kazuyo Inaba (稲葉 和世, Inaba Kazuyo; born 13 April 1959) is a Japanese former breaststroke swimmer. She competed in two events at the 1976 Summer Olympics.
