= Kurayoshi =

Kurayoshi 倉吉市
- City
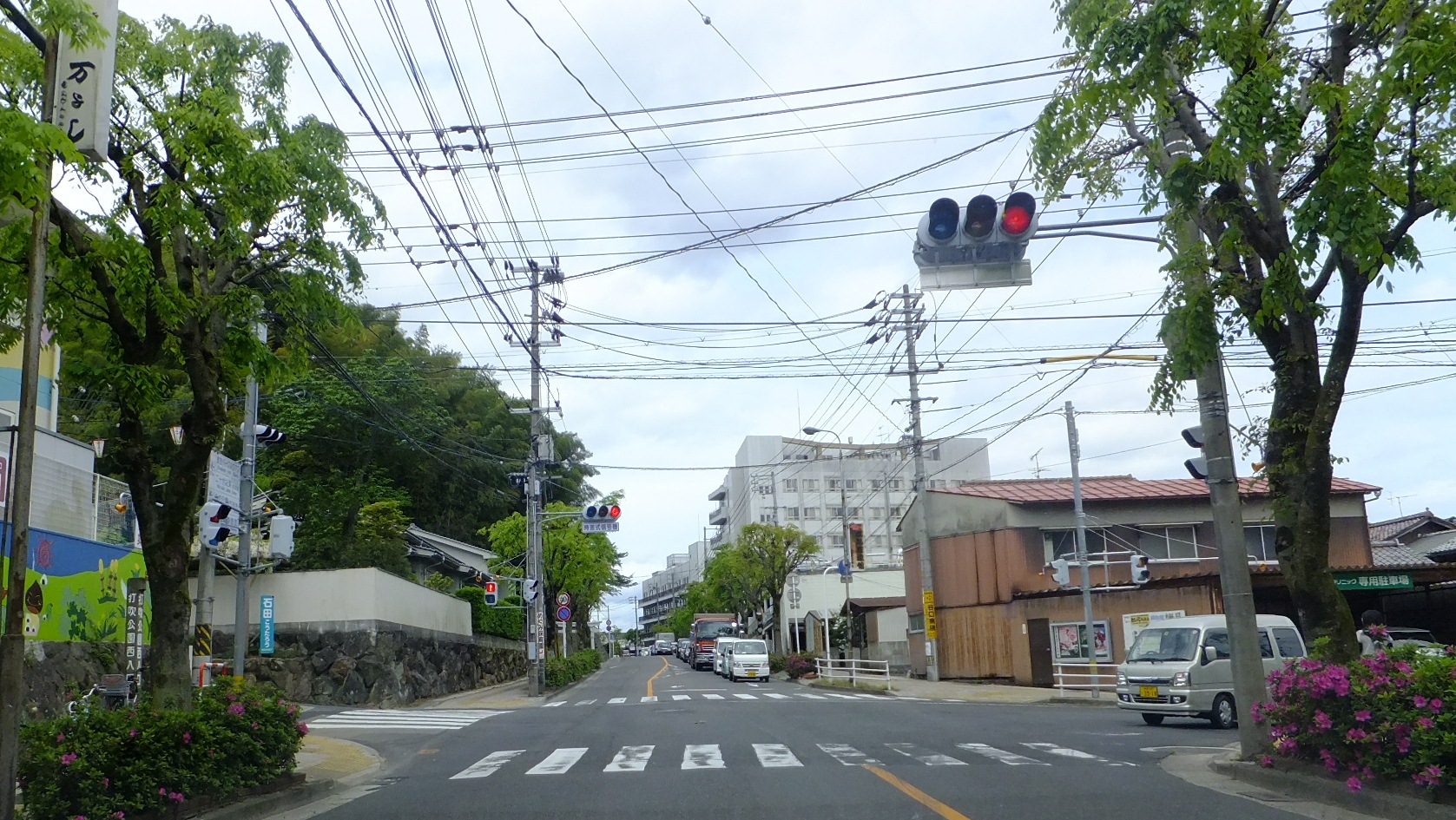
- Kurayoshi city

- Flag Emblem
- Interactive map of Kurayoshi
- Location in Japan
- Coordinates: 35°26′N 133°49′E
- Country: Japan
- Region: Chūgoku (San'in)
- Prefecture: Tottori

Government
  - Mayor: Kazuyasu Hirota (since April 2022)

Area
  - Total: 272.06 km^{2} (105.04 sq mi)

Population (December 31, 2022)
  - Total: 44,969
  - Density: 165.29/km^{2} (428.10/sq mi)
- Time zone: UTC+09:00 (JST)
- City hall address: 722 Aoimachi, Kurayoshi-shi, Tottori-ken 682-8611
- Climate: Cfa
- Website: Official website
- Symbols
- Flower: Azalea
- Tree: Camellia

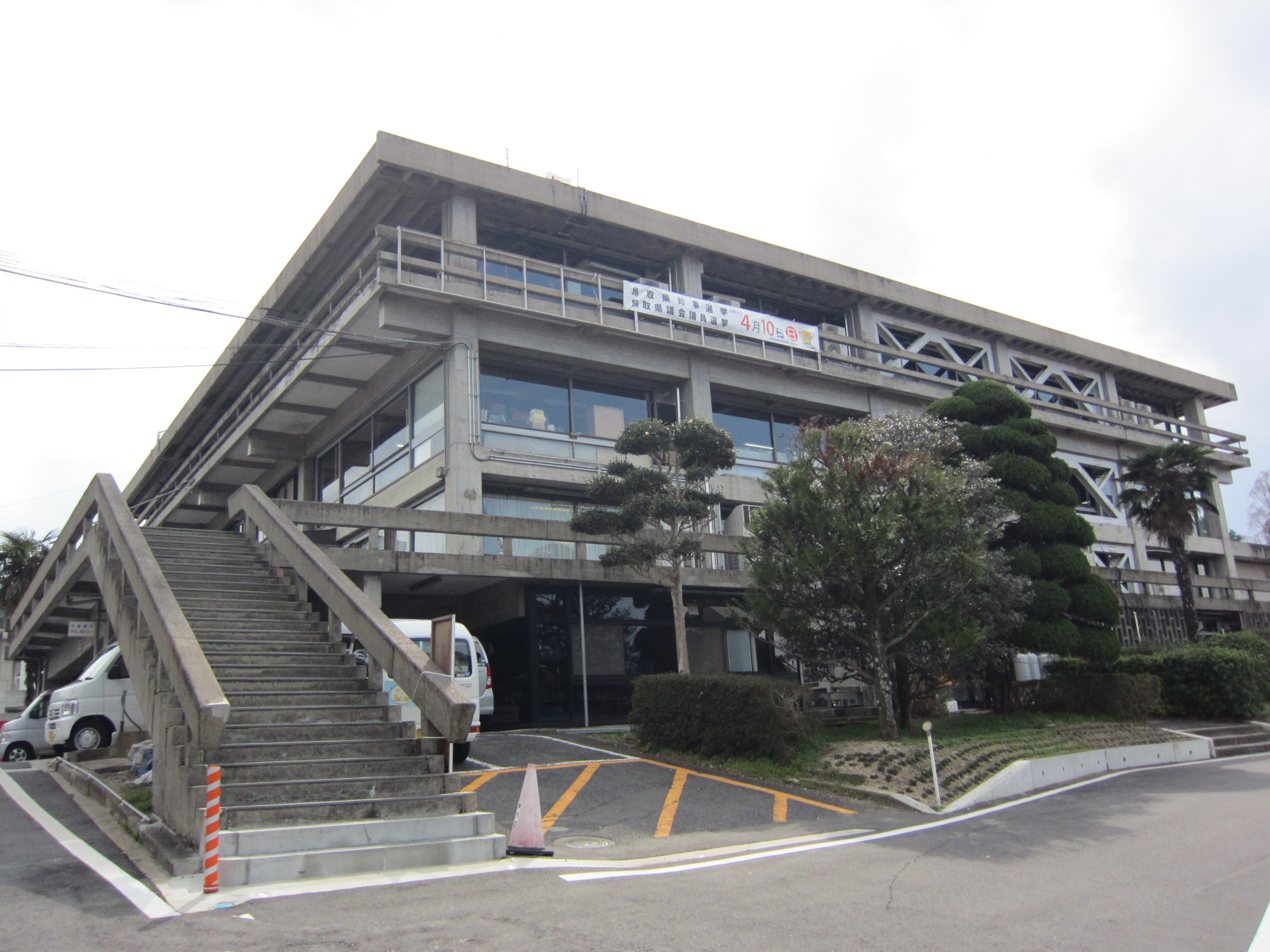
Kurayoshi City Hall

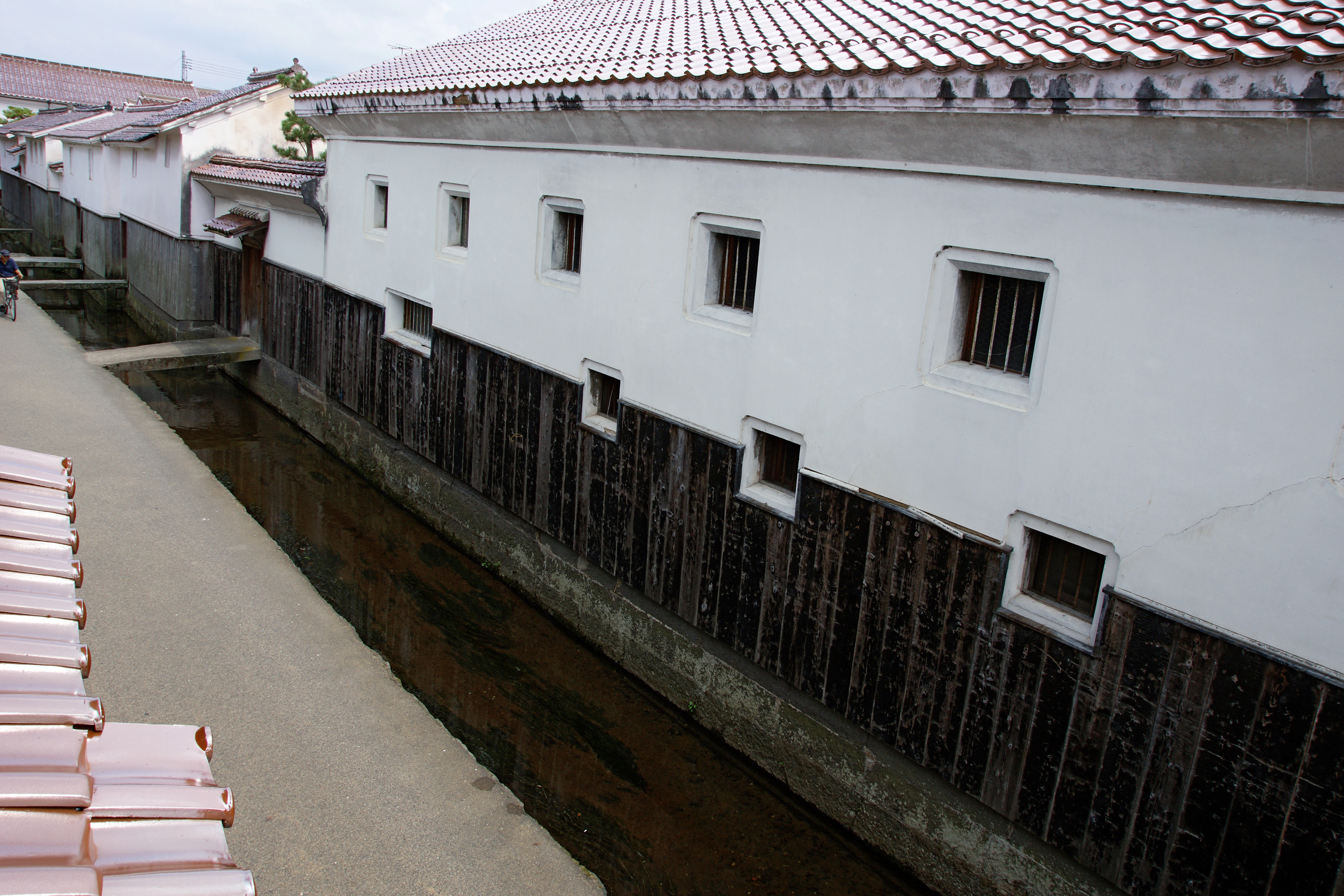
Kurayoshi Utsubuki-Tamagawa Historic Preservation District

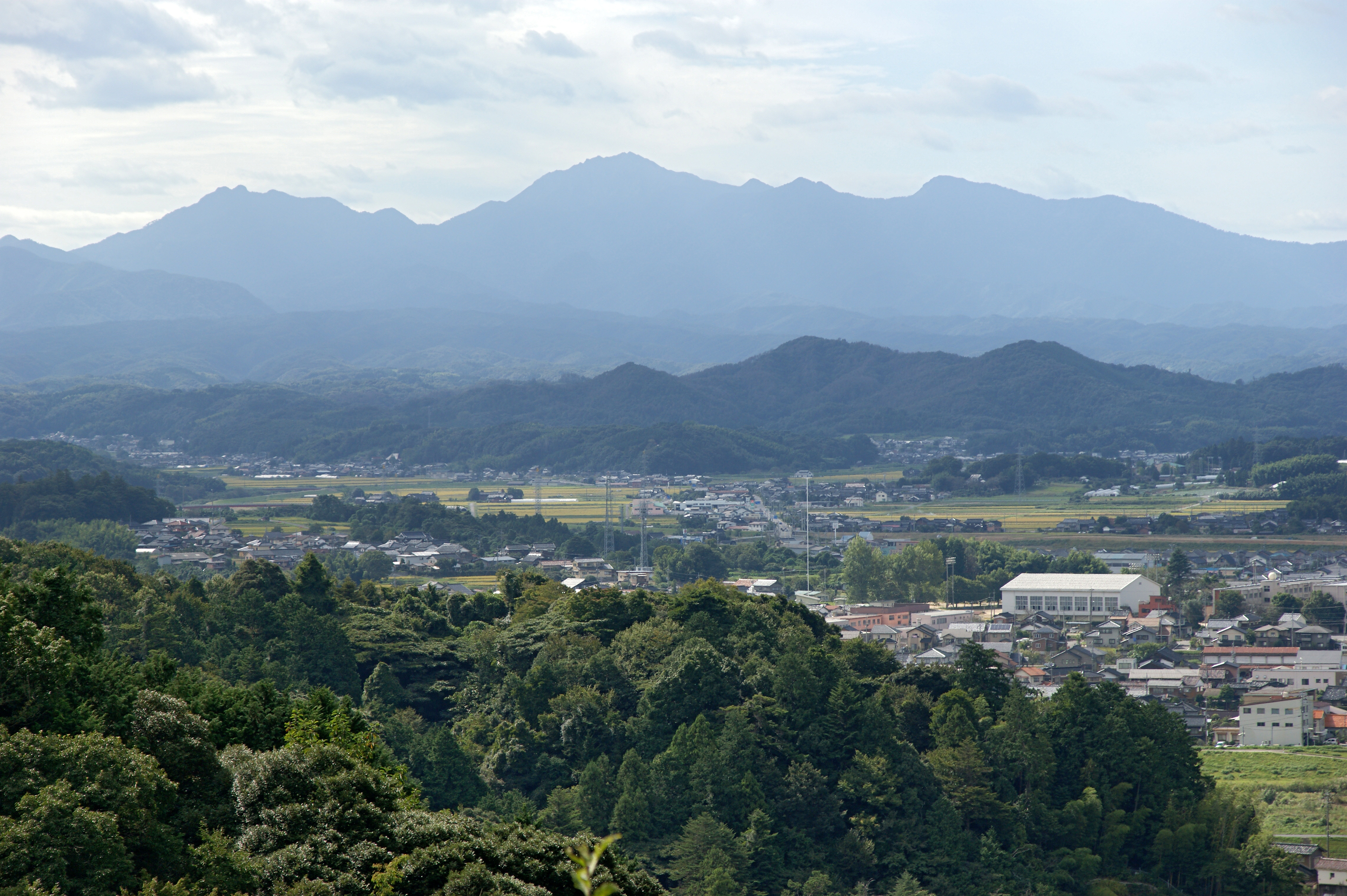
View from Utsubuki Castle ruins

Kurayoshi (倉吉市, Kurayoshi-shi) is a city located in the central part of Tottori Prefecture, Japan. As of 31 December 2021, the city had an estimated population of 44,969 in 20,609 households and a population density of 170 persons per km^{2}. The total area of the city is 272.06 square kilometres (105.04 sq mi).

== Geography ==
Kurayoshi forms a major part of the Kurayoshi Plain (倉吉平野, Kurayoshi Heiya). The plain supports the agriculture of the region, and is a major center of rice and pears, as well as grapes in the sandy areas near the Sea of Japan coast.

=== Surrounding municipalities ===
Tottori Prefecture

- Hokuei
- Yurihama
- Misasa
- Kōfu
- Kotoura

Okayama Prefecture

- Maniwa

=== Climate ===
Kurayoshi has a humid subtropical climate (Köppen Cfa) characterized by warm, wet summers and cold winters with heavy snowfall. The average annual temperature in Kurayoshi is 14.8 °C (58.6 °F). The average annual rainfall is 1,760.4 mm (69.31 in), with September as the wettest month. The temperatures are highest on average in August, at around 26.3 °C (79.3 °F), and lowest in January, at around 4.4 °C (39.9 °F). Its record high is 37.9 °C (100.2 °F), reached on 2 August 2023, and its record low is −8.0 °C (17.6 °F), reached on 6 February 2018.

Climate data for Kurayoshi (1991−2020 normals, extremes 1978−present)
Month	Jan	Feb	Mar	Apr	May	Jun	Jul	Aug	Sep	Oct	Nov	Dec	Year
Record high °C (°F)	18.4 (65.1)	22.4 (72.3)	27.3 (81.1)	33.6 (92.5)	33.7 (92.7)	34.4 (93.9)	36.3 (97.3)	37.9 (100.2)	35.7 (96.3)	32.4 (90.3)	26.0 (78.8)	22.9 (73.2)	37.9 (100.2)
Mean daily maximum °C (°F)	7.9 (46.2)	8.6 (47.5)	12.3 (54.1)	17.6 (63.7)	22.5 (72.5)	25.3 (77.5)	29.2 (84.6)	30.5 (86.9)	26.5 (79.7)	21.8 (71.2)	16.5 (61.7)	10.8 (51.4)	19.1 (66.4)
Daily mean °C (°F)	4.4 (39.9)	4.7 (40.5)	7.7 (45.9)	12.6 (54.7)	17.4 (63.3)	21.2 (70.2)	25.4 (77.7)	26.3 (79.3)	22.2 (72.0)	17.1 (62.8)	12.0 (53.6)	6.9 (44.4)	14.8 (58.7)
Mean daily minimum °C (°F)	1.4 (34.5)	1.2 (34.2)	3.2 (37.8)	7.4 (45.3)	12.4 (54.3)	17.5 (63.5)	22.2 (72.0)	22.8 (73.0)	18.7 (65.7)	13.0 (55.4)	8.1 (46.6)	3.6 (38.5)	11.0 (51.7)
Record low °C (°F)	−6.2 (20.8)	−8.0 (17.6)	−3.2 (26.2)	−1.0 (30.2)	3.3 (37.9)	9.2 (48.6)	13.3 (55.9)	16.0 (60.8)	8.4 (47.1)	4.1 (39.4)	0.9 (33.6)	−4.0 (24.8)	−8.0 (17.6)
Average precipitation mm (inches)	154.2 (6.07)	112.1 (4.41)	124.1 (4.89)	100.0 (3.94)	115.2 (4.54)	145.6 (5.73)	191.5 (7.54)	134.3 (5.29)	226.9 (8.93)	154.5 (6.08)	141.9 (5.59)	160.7 (6.33)	1,760.4 (69.31)
Average snowfall cm (inches)	51 (20)	50 (20)	7 (2.8)	trace	0 (0)	0 (0)	0 (0)	0 (0)	0 (0)	0 (0)	0 (0)	20 (7.9)	128 (50)
Average precipitation days (≥ 1.0 mm)	18.3	15.0	13.8	10.7	10.0	11.1	12.5	10.2	12.4	10.5	13.6	17.2	155.3
Average snowy days (≥ 3 cm)	4.8	4.5	0.5	0.1	0	0	0	0	0	0	0	1.9	11.8
Mean monthly sunshine hours	69.7	85.3	138.5	181.0	202.5	156.8	171.0	206.8	142.1	144.8	108.3	80.8	1,686.4
Source: Japan Meteorological Agency

== Demography ==
Per Japanese census data, the population of Kurayoshi has been as follows:

Historical population
Year	Pop.	±%
1920	41,824	—
1930	46,240	+10.6%
1940	46,736	+1.1%
1950	58,113	+24.3%
1960	57,862	−0.4%
1970	54,740	−5.4%
1980	57,252	+4.6%
1990	56,602	−1.1%
2000	54,027	−4.5%
2010	50,728	−6.1%

== History ==
The area of Kurayoshi was part of ancient Hōki Province, and the Hōki Provincial Capital and Hōki Kokubun-ji were located in this area. The local Ogamo clan dominated the area in the Heian period and into the Kamakura period. In the Muromachi period, Tauchi Castle and Utsubukiyama Castle were built, and the Yamana clan dominated in the area. The current city of Kurayoshi developed from the jōkamachi of Utsubukiyama Castle. After the decline of the Yamana, the area was controlled by the Nanjo clan, who were based in what is now Yurihama. The Nanjo were disposed after the 1600 Battle of Sekigahara, and their territory used by Nakamura Kazutada of Yonago Domain until 1609. In 1614, Satomi Tadayoshi was transferred to Kurayoshi from Tateyama Domain by the Tokugawa shogunate. From 1617, Kurayoshi became part of the holdings of the Ikeda clan at Tottori Domain. From 1632, a senior retainer of the Tottori Domain, the Arao clan, built a jin'ya in Kurayoshi. During the Edo period, Kurayoshi prospered as the center of commerce and industry. In the Utsubuki-Tamagawa area (an important preservation district for groups of traditional buildings), traditional buildings, including many 'soil lacquered' warehouses (dozo, 土蔵), from the late Edo period still remain. Following the Meiji restoration, the town of Kurayoshi was established on October 1, 1889 with the creation of the modern municipalities system. Kurayoshi was raised to city status on October 1, 1953. On March 22, 2005 the town of Sekigane (from Tōhaku District) was merged into Kurayoshi.

== Etymology ==
The name of Kurayoshi in the Japanese language is formed from two kanji characters. The first, 倉, means "warehouse", a historical feature of the city, and the second, 吉 means "good" or "good fortune".

== Government ==
Kurayoshi has a mayor-council form of government with a directly elected mayor and a unicameral city council of 17 members. Kurayoshi contributes three members to the Tottori Prefectural Assembly. In terms of national politics, the city is part of Tottori 2nd district of the lower house of the Diet of Japan.

== Economy ==
The economy of Kurayoshi is primarily agricultural with some light manufacturing.

== Education ==
Kurayoshi has 13 public elementary schools and five public junior high schools operated by the town government. The city has four public high schools operated by the Tottori Prefectural Board of Education and one private high school. The Tottori College of Nursing and Tottori College are also located in Kurayoshi.

== Transportation ==
=== Railway ===
JR West - San'in Line

- Kurayoshi

=== Highways ===
- National Route 179
- National Route 313

== International relations ==
Kurayoshi is twinned with:

- Matsudo, Chiba, Japan, since 2004
- Naju, South Korea

== Local attractions ==
- Tottori Nijisseiki Pear Museum
- Kurayoshi Park Square, a local development featuring museums, conference rooms, a music hall, restaurants, and park space, remains a popular meeting place. Nearby Utsubuki park is known throughout the prefecture as one of the best places to view cherry blossoms in spring. The park also features sports fields and a small animal zoo.

=== National Historic Sites ===
- Amidaji Kofun Cluster
- Sanmyōji Kofun
- Ōmidō temple ruins
- Ōhara temple ruins
- Hōki Kokunbun-ji ruins
- Hōki Provincial Capital ruins

== Gallery ==
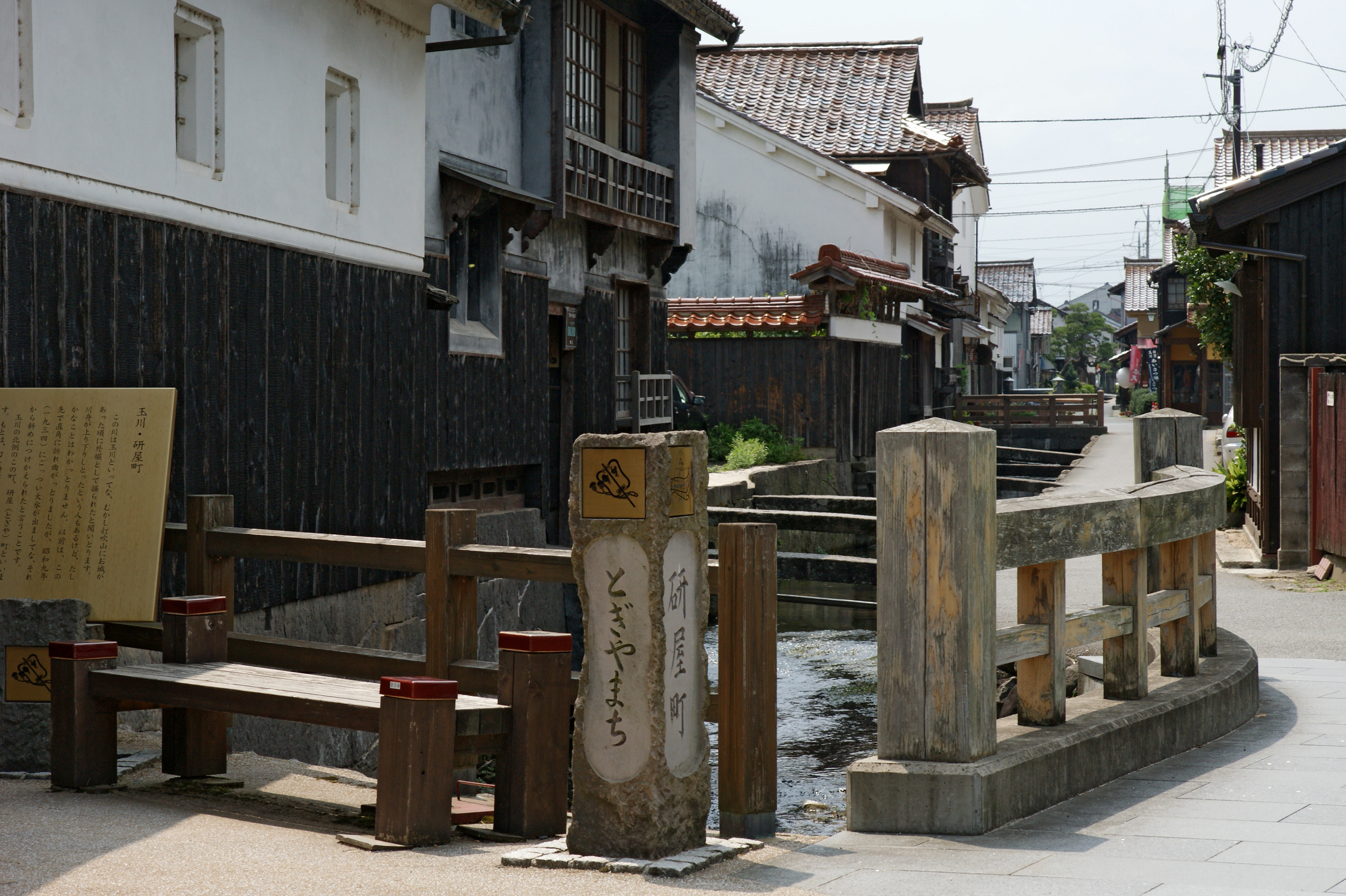
Dozo (土蔵) (Utsubuki-tamagawa)

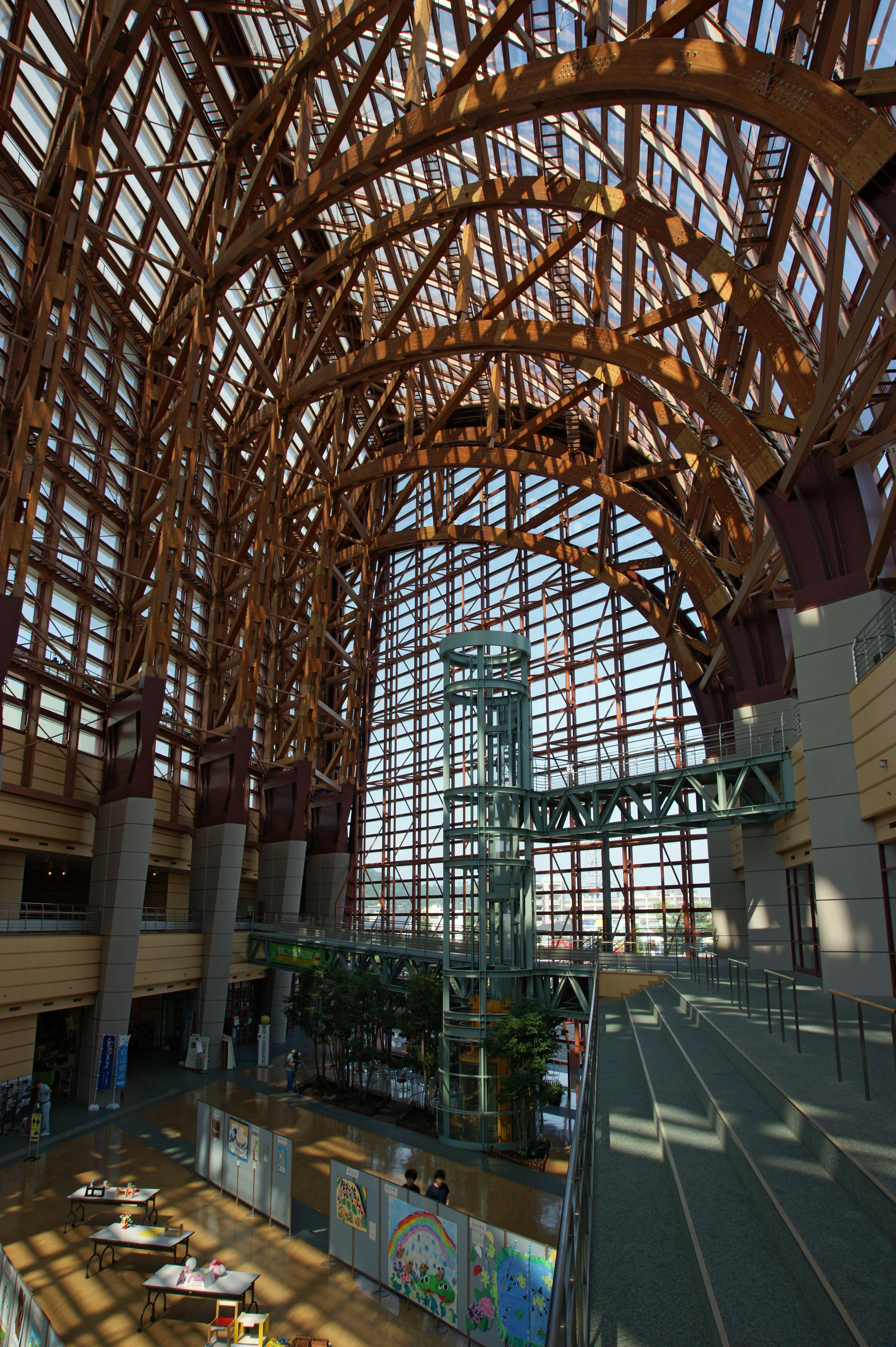
Kurayoshi Park Square

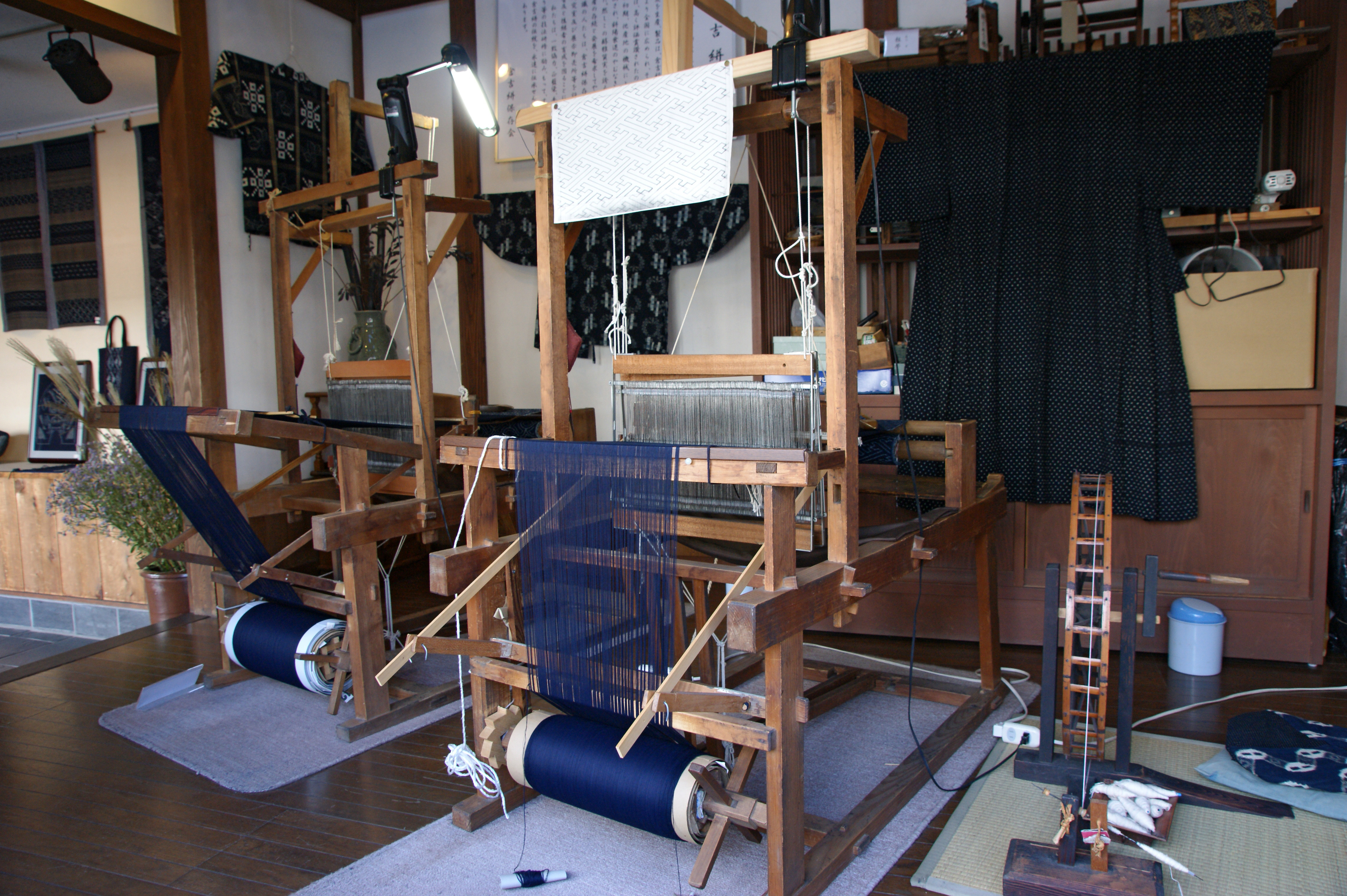
Traditional weaving

== Notable people from Kurayoshi ==
- Kunihiko Hashida, physician, politician and Minister of Education
- Ochiai Tetsuya, sumo wrestler
