= Satomi Tadayoshi =

Japanese samurai (1594-1622)

Satomi Tadayoshi

Satomi Tadayoshi (里見 忠義; 1594 – July 27, 1622) was a retainer of the Japanese clan of Ōkubo following the Azuchi-Momoyama period of the 17th century. Following the conspiracy of the Ōkubo clan against the authority of the Tokugawa Shogunate, Tadayoshi along with many others under the Ōkubo were dispossessed of their personal holdings.
