= Inaba Masaaki =

Japanese daimyō

Inaba Masaaki 稲葉 正明
- Born: 1723
- Died: September 9, 1793 (aged 69–70)
- Other names: Etchū-no-kami; Echizen-no-kami
- Occupation: Daimyō

Inaba Masaaki (稲葉 正明; 1723 – September 9, 1793) was daimyō of Tateyama Domain during late-Edo period Japan.

== Biography ==
Inaba Masaaki was the third son of the daimyō of Yodo Domain in Yamashiro Province, Inaba Masachika On his father's death, he received a 3000 koku stipend and was allowed to establish his own hatamoto household. In August 1737, he became a page to Shōgun Tokugawa Ieharu, and received Lower 5th Court Rank and the courtesy title of Etchu-no-kami . He was promoted steadily through the ranks of the hatamoto with the support of Tanuma Okitsugu, gaining 2,000 koku in Hitachi and Kazusa Provinces in 1769, an additional 2,000 koku in Awa Province in 1777, and 3,000 koku more in Awa and Kazusa in September 1781. This last grant qualified him for the status of daimyō, and he was allowed to revive Tateyama Domain in Awa Province, which had been dormant since the fall of the Satomi clan in 1614. In May 1784, he changed his courtesy title to Echizen-no-kami, and in 1785 received an additional 3,000 koku in Awa Province.

However, after the death of Shōgun Tokugawa Ieharu and the assassination of Tanuma Okitsugu, he was included in the purge of Tanuma's followers by Matsudaira Sadanobu and lost 3000 koku of his holdings, as well as the domain's residence in Edo.

He retired from public life on July 8, 1789, turning Tateyama Domain over to his 4th son, Inaba Masatake. Inaba Masaaki was married to a daughter of Toda Ujifusa, daimyō of Ogaki-Shinden Domain in Mino Province. He died on August 5, 1793, and his grave is at the temple of Kōfuku-ji in Sumida, Tokyo.

Preceded by none	Daimyō of Tateyama; 1781–1789	Succeeded by Inaba Masatake
