= Inaba Masayasu =

- 稲葉 正休
- Died: 7 October 1684 (aged 43–44)
- Title: Daimyō of Aono han in Mino Province

Inaba Masayasu (稲葉 正休; 1640 – October 7, 1684) was a Japanese hatamoto and daimyō (feudal lord) of Aono han in Mino Province in Edo period Japan. Masayasu's family was descended from Konō Michitaka.

Masayasu was the son of hatamoto Inaba Masakichi, from whom he inherited the 5000 koku territory of Aono han in 1656. He served as a page and clerk for some time, before being summoned by the shogunate to oversee irrigation projects in the provinces of Kawachi and Settsu. For this, he was awarded the post of wakadoshiyori in 1682, and had his lands expanded to 12,000 koku. Masayasu visited Kyoto as part of a formal inspection in 1683. In this period, Masayasu's cousin, Inaba Masamichi, held the powerful and highly trusted position of Kyoto shoshidai.

Masayasu is perhaps best known to history for assassinating his distant cousin, the Tairō Hotta Masatoshi (Masatoshi’s grandMother was Daughter of Inaba Masanori which made Masatoshi was Masayas’s first cousin once removed) inside Edo castle in 1684. Masayasu's motives remain unknown; but the absence of severe adverse repercussions for his family leaves open the supposition that the shōgun himself was privy to a planned assassination.

In the Edo period, the Inaba were identified as one of the fudai or insider daimyō clans which were hereditary vassals or allies of the Tokugawa clan, in contrast with the tozama or outsider clans.

== Inaba clan genealogy ==
The fudai Inaba clan originated in Mino province. They claim descent from Kōno Michitaka (d. 1374), who claimed descent from Emperor Kammu (736–805).

Masasayu was part of the cadet branch of the Inaba which was created in 1588. This branch is descended from Inaba Masanari (+1628), who fought in the armies of Nobunaga and then Hideyoshi.

In 1619, Masanari was granted the han of Itoigawa (25,000 koku) in Echigo province; then, in 1627, his holding was transferred to Mōka Domain (65,000 koku) in Shimotsuke province. Masanari's descendants resided successively at Odawara Domain (105,000 koku) in Sagami province from 1632 through 1685; at Takata Domain in Echigo province from 1685 through 1701; at Sakura Domain in Shimōsa province from 1701 through 1723.

Masasayu's relatives and others who were also descendants of Inaba Masanari settled at Yodo Domain (115,000 koku) in Yamashiro province from 1723 through 1868. The head of this clan line was ennobled as a "Viscount" in the Meiji period.

== Tokugawa official ==
Masayasu was a junior counselor (wakadoshiyori) in the Edo shogunate.

== Notes ==
Preceded by Inaba Masayoshi	1st Lord of Aono (Inaba); 1682-1684	Succeeded by none
