= Usuki Domain =

Administrative division in Japan during the Edo period (1600–1871)

Usuki Domain 臼杵藩
- Domain of Japan
- 1600–1871
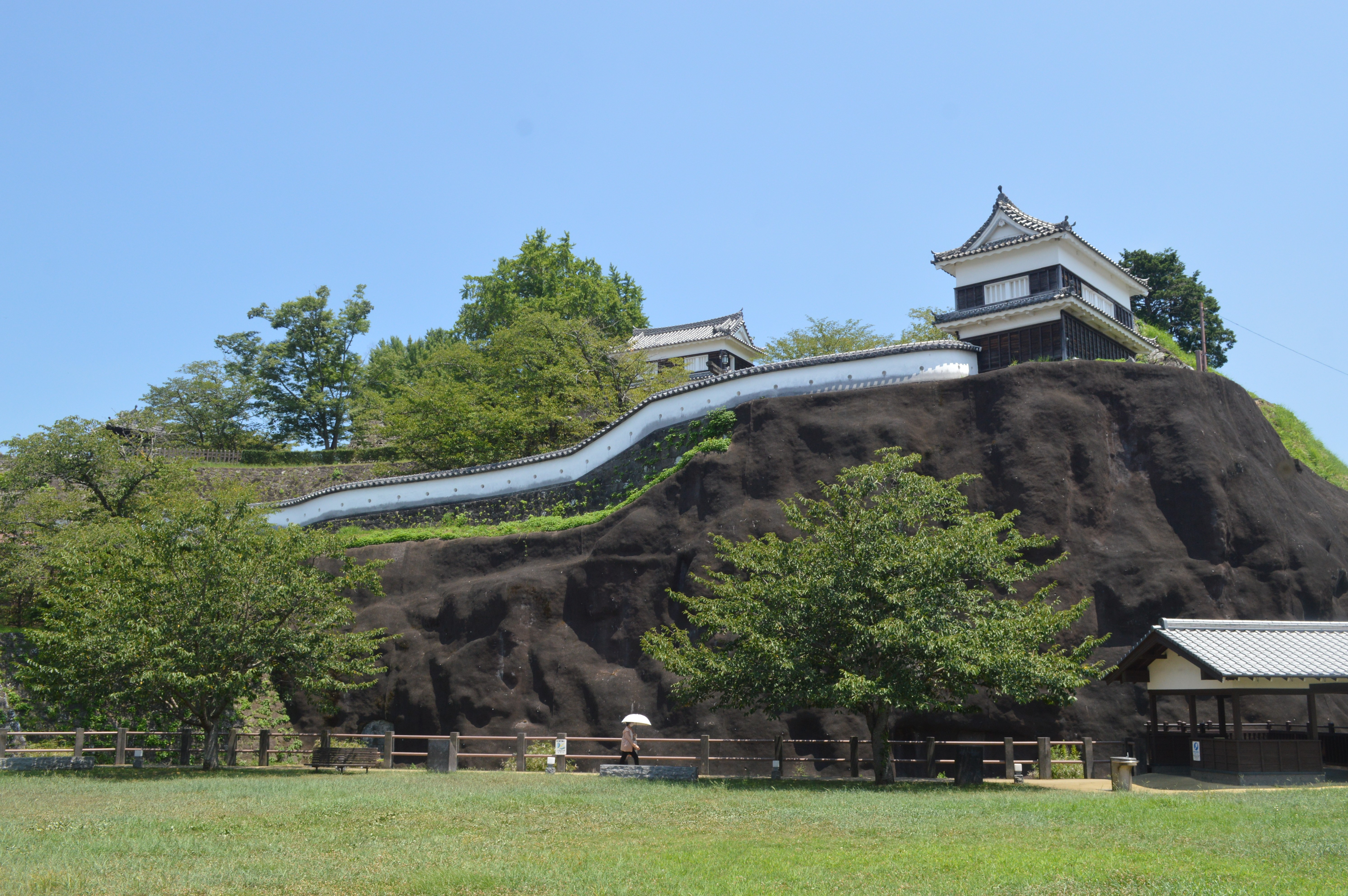
- Usuki Castle

- Mon of the Inaba clan
- Capital: Usuki Castle
- Area
  - Coordinates: 33°7′18.59″N 131°48′14.77″E
- Historical era: Edo period
  - Established: 1600
  - Abolition of the han system: 1871
- Contained within
  - Province: Bungo Province
- Today part of: Oita Prefecture

Location of Usuki Castle
Usuki Domain (Japan)

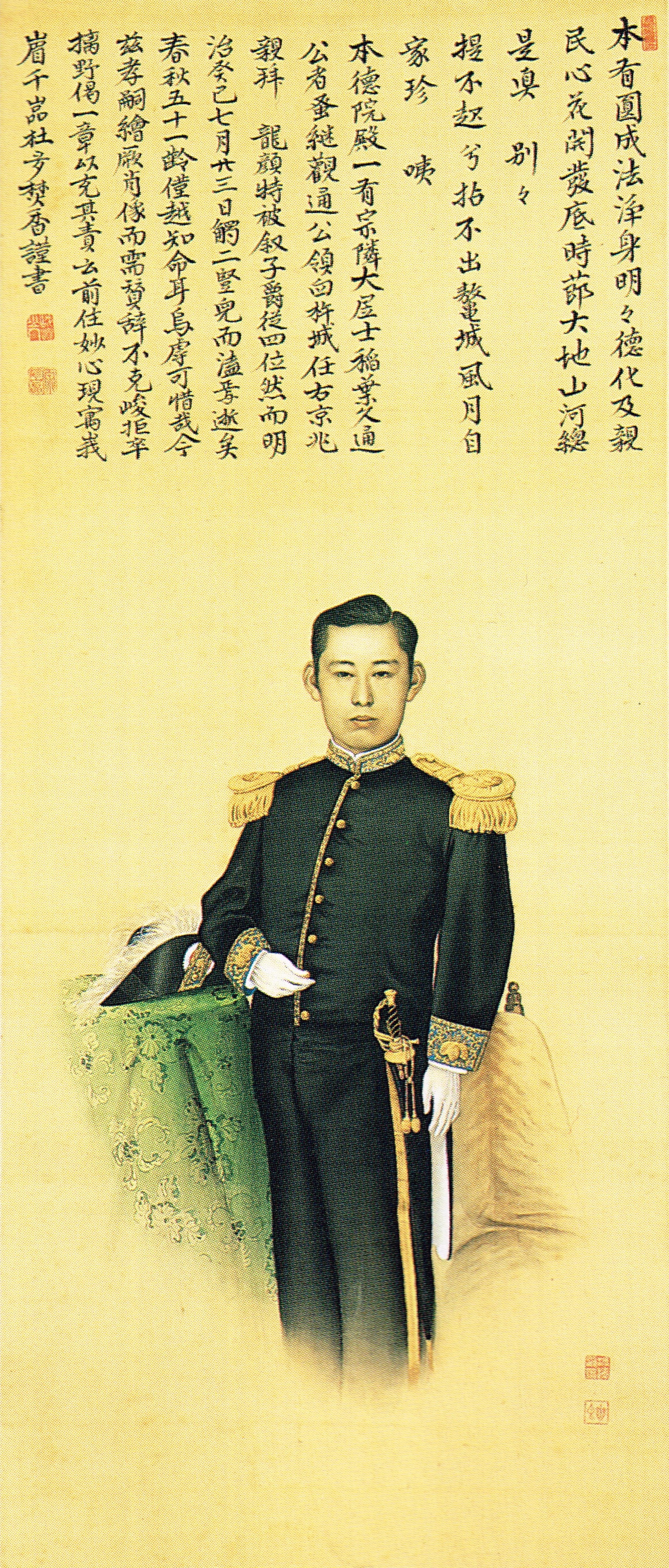
Inaba Hismichi, final daimyō of Usuki Domain

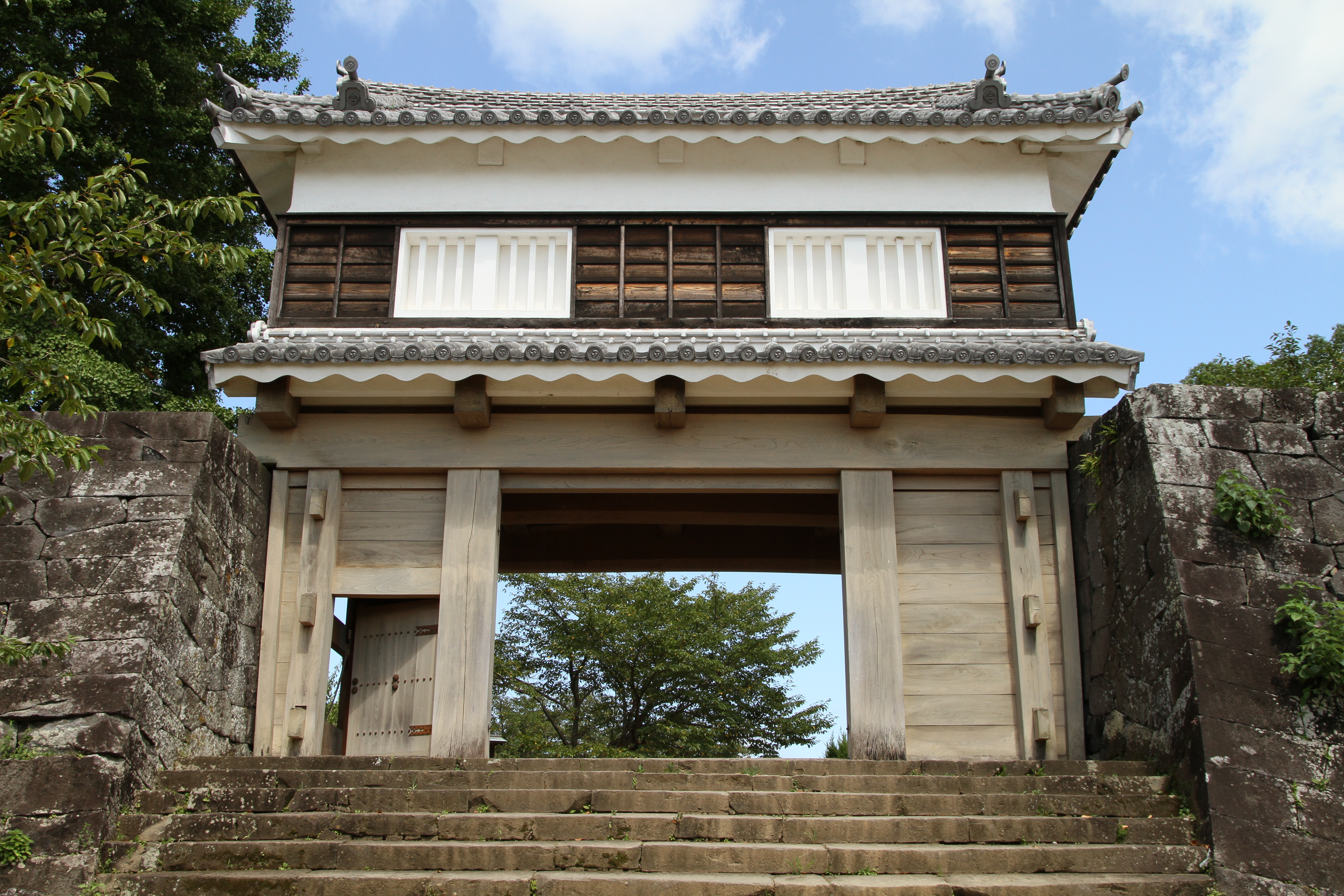
Gate of Usuki Castle

Usuki Domain (臼杵藩, Usuki-han) was a feudal domain under the Tokugawa shogunate of Edo period Japan, in what is now eastern Ōita Prefecture. It was centered around Usuki Castle in what is now the city of Usuki, Ōita and was ruled by the tozama daimyō Inaba clan for all of its history.

== History ==
Bungo Province was under the control of the Ōtomo clan from the Kamakura period to the Sengoku period. Under the tenure of the Kirishitan warlord Ōtomo Sōrin, the Ōtomo clan was defeated by the Shimazu clan from 1586, and were confined to Nyūjima Castle (the predecessor of Usuki Castle). The Ōtomo were saved by Toyotomi Hideyoshi's 1586-1587 Kyūshū campaign and were allowed to reclaim Bungo province as their territory. However, Ōtomo Yoshimune (Sōrin's son) behaved in a cowardly manner during the Japanese invasions of Korea (1592–1598) which so angered Hideyoshi that he was deprived of his fief and banished. Bungo was divided into small fiefs, of which the 65,000 koku holding at Usuki was the largest. This was awarded to Ōta Kazuyoshi, who had a falling out with Ishida Mitsunari resulting in his being sidelined during the 1600 Battle of Sekigahara. He later died a monk in Kyoto. On the other hand, a general in the Western Army, Inaba Sadamichi, defected to Tokugawa Ieyasu's Eastern Army and achieved great military exploits at the Battle of Sekigahara, for which he was awarded 40,000 koku in Mino Province and 50,000 koku at Usuki in Bingo. Throughout the Edo period, the Inaba clan continued to rule Usuki for 15 generations.

The Inaba clan were classified as tozama daimyō as they became vassals of the Tokugawa after the Battle of Sekigahara. There was another branch of the Inaba who were fudai daimyō. Hayashi Masanari married Inaba Shigemichi's daughter, taking the "Inaba" surname. He later married Lady Kasuga, the wet nurse to Shogun Tokugawa Iemitsu.

In Usuki, the 5th daimyō, Inaba Kagemichi, developed the jōkamachi of Usuki and the domain's administration. From the middle of the Edo period onward, the domain's finances became tight, and in 1830, the 12th daimyō, Inaba Terumichi, had debts exceeding 300,000 ryō. For this reason, in 1831, his retired father, Inaba Hiromichi, who had retained political power behind-the-scenes, carried out somewhat rough reforms such as thorough fiscal austerity and new rice field development, as well as the abandonment of old debts and negotiations for grace periods for repayments. As a result, the domain's finances improved considerably. In addition, all of the daimyō from the 11th daimyō, Takamichi onwards, either died young or had no heirs, so the domain was constantly on the edge of attainder as many succession notifications to the shogunate were by posthumous adoptions. In 1844, the domain supplemented its military by organizing a paramilitary force centered on farmers with rifles who had experience as hunters.

In the Bakumatsu period. the domain maintained neutrality, but in June 1869 Inaba Hisamichi was the first of the Bungo daimyō to return his domain registry to the Meiji government, and was appointed domainal governor. In 1871, due to the abolition of the han system, the domain became Usuki Prefecture, and was later incorporated into Ōita Prefecture. The Inaba clan was elevated to the kazoku peerage with the title of viscount in 1884.

== Holdings at the end of the Edo period ==
As with most domains in the han system, Usuki Domain consisted of several discontinuous territories calculated to provide the assigned kokudaka, based on periodic cadastral surveys and projected agricultural yields, g.

- Bungo Province
  - 97 villages in Amabe District
  - 39 villages in Ōita District
  - 143 villages in Ōno District

== List of daimyō ==
#	Name	Tenure	Courtesy title	Court Rank	kokudaka
Inaba clan, 1600 -1871 (Tozama)
1	Inaba Sadamichi (稲葉貞通)	1600–1603	Ukyō-no-suke (右京亮), Jijū (侍従)	Junior 5th Rank, Lower Grade (従五位下)	50,000 koku
2	Inaba Norimichi (稲葉典通)	1603–1626	Jijū (侍従)	Junior 5th Rank, Lower Grade (従五位下)	50,000 koku
3	Inaba Kazumichi (稲葉一通)	1626–1641	Minbu-no-shō (民部少輔)	Junior 5th Rank, Lower Grade (従五位下)	50,000 koku
4	Inaba Nobumichi (稲葉信通)	1641–1673	Noto-no-kami (能登守)	Junior 5th Rank, Lower Grade (従五位下)	50,000 koku
5	Inaba Kagemichi (稲葉景通)	1673–1694	Ukyō-no-suke (右京亮)	Junior 5th Rank, Lower Grade (従五位下)	50,000 koku
6	Inaba Toshimichi (稲葉知通)	1694–1706	Noto-no-kami (能登守)	Junior 5th Rank, Lower Grade (従五位下)	50,000 koku
7	Inaba Tsunemichi (稲葉恒通)	1706–1720	Iyo-no-kami (伊予守)	Junior 5th Rank, Lower Grade (従五位下)	50,000 koku
8	Inaba Masamichi (稲葉董通)	1720–1737	Noto-no-kami (能登守)	Junior 5th Rank, Lower Grade (従五位下)	50,000 koku
9	Inaba Yasumichi (稲葉泰通)	1737–1768	Ukyō-no-suke (右京亮)	Junior 5th Rank, Lower Grade (従五位下)	50,000 koku
10	Inaba Hiromichi (稲葉弘通)	1768–1800	Tanba-no-kami (丹波守)	Junior 5th Rank, Lower Grade (従五位下)	50,000 koku
11	Inaba Terumichi (稲葉雍通)	1800–1820	Shimōsa-no-kami (下総守)	Junior 5th Rank, Lower Grade (従五位下)	50,000 koku
12	Inaba Takamichi (稲葉尊通)	1820–1821	Minbu-no-shō (民部少輔)	Junior 5th Rank, Lower Grade (従五位下)	50,000 koku
13	Inaba Chikamichi (稲葉幾通)	1821–1843	Bitchū-no-kami (備中守)	Junior 5th Rank, Lower Grade (従五位下)	50,000 koku
14	Inaba Akimichi (稲葉観通)	1843–1862	Iyo-no-kami (伊予守)	Junior 5th Rank, Lower Grade (従五位下)	50,000 koku
15	Inaba Hisamichi (稲葉久通)	1862–1871	Hida-no-kami (飛騨守)	Junior 5th Rank, Lower Grade (従五位下)	50,000 koku

== See also ==
- List of Han
- Abolition of the han system
