= Inaba Masanari =

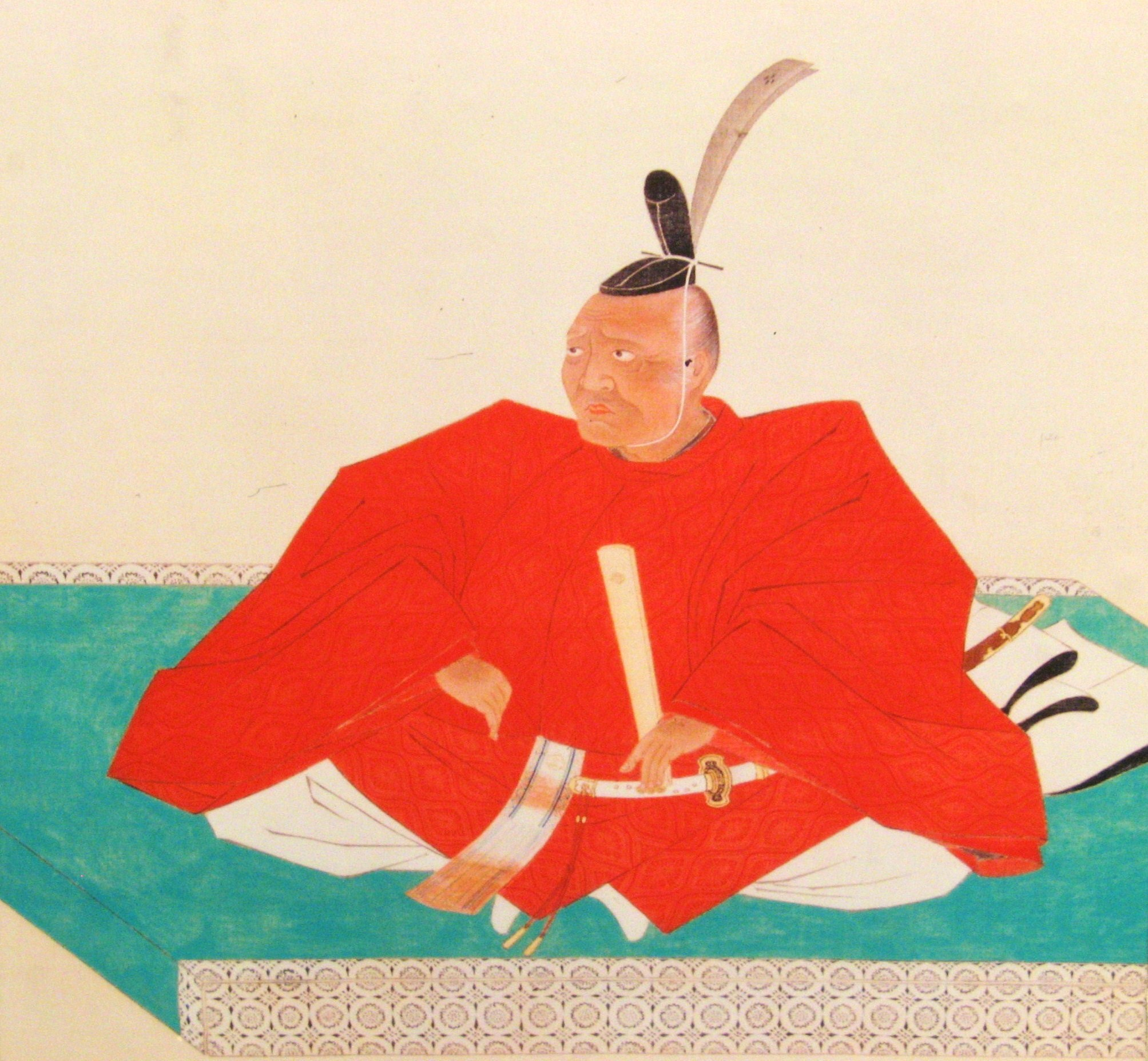

1st Daimyō of Mōka
- In office 1627–1628
- Preceded by: Hori Chikayoshi
- Succeeded by: Inaba Masakatsu

Personal details
- Born: 1571
- Died: October 14, 1628 (age 57)
- Spouse: Lady Kasuga

Inaba Masanari (稲葉 正成; 1571 – October 14, 1628), also known as Inaba Masashige and sometimes known as Mino-no-kami, was a Japanese samurai of the Azuchi–Momoyama period through early Edo period. He served the Oda, Toyotomi, and Tokugawa clans, and became a daimyō in the early Edo period.

Masanari was the husband of Kasuga-no-Tsubone, who bore him three sons: Masakatsu, Masasada, and Masatoshi. For some reason, Masanari divorced her; and she then became wet-nurse to Tokugawa Hidetada's eldest son. Though Masanari and Kasuga divorced, they still maintained a good relationship as parents to their children. One of Masanari's grandsons, Inaba Masayasu (1640–1684), is primarily remembered as the enigmatic wakadoshiyori assassin of tairō Hotta Masatoshi.

In the Edo period, the Inaba were identified as one of the fudai or insider daimyō clans which were hereditary vassals or allies of the Tokugawa clan, as opposed to the tozama or outsider clans.

== Inaba clan branches ==
The fudai Inaba clan originated in 16th century Mino Province. They claimed descent from Kōno Michitaka (d. 1374), who claimed descent from Emperor Kanmu (736–805).

A cadet branch was descended from Inaba Masanari (+1628), who fought in the armies of Nobunaga and then Hideyoshi. This branch of the Inaba was created in 1588. In 1619, he was granted the han of Itoigawa (25,000 koku) in Echigo Province; then, in 1627, his holding was transferred to Mōka Domain (65,000 koku) in Shimotsuke Province. His descendants resided successively in Odawara Domain (105,000 koku) in Sagami Province from 1632 through 1685; om Takata Domain in Echigo province from 1685 through 1701; in Sakura Domain in Shimōsa Province from 1701 through 1723. Masanari's heirs settled in Yodo Domain (115,000 koku) in Yamashiro Province from 1723 through 1868.

The head of this clan line was ennobled as a "viscount" in the Meiji period.

== Notable descendants ==
- Inaba Masamichi, 1681–1685—8th Kyoto shoshidai.
- Inaba Masanobu, 1804–1806—34th Kyoto shoshidai.
- Inaba Masakuni, 1863–1864—55th Kyoto shoshidai.

== Notes ==
Preceded by none	1st Daimyō of Jūshichijō; 1607–1618	Succeeded by none
Preceded by none	1st Daimyō of Itoigawa (Inaba); 1618–1624	Succeeded by none
Preceded by Hori Chikayoshi	1st Daimyō of Mōka (Inaba); 1627–1628	Succeeded by Inaba Masakatsu
