= Inaba Masanobu =

Japanese daimyō (1749–1806)

Inaba Masanobu (稲葉 正謖, November 8, 1749 – October 5, 1806) was a daimyō in early 19th-century Japan during the Edo period. Masanobu's family was descended from Masanari, a younger son of Konō Michitaka, daimyō from Mino province who had been a vassal of Oda Nobunaga and later Toyotomi Hideyoshi. Thunberg's trip from Dejima to Edo passed through Yamashiro, and his account reports that Masanobu was daimyō of Yodo .

In the Edo period, the Inaba were identified as one of the fudai or insider daimyō clans which were hereditary vassals or allies of the Tokugawa clan, in contrast with the tozama or outsider clans.

== Inaba clan genealogy ==
The fudai Inaba clan originated in Mino Province. They claim descent from Kōno Michitaka (d. 1374), who claimed descent from Emperor Kanmu (736–805).

Masanobu was part of the cadet branch of the Inaba which was created in 1588. This branch is descended from Inaba Masanari (d. 1628), who fought in the armies of Nobunaga and then Hideyoshi.

In 1619, Masanari was granted the han of Itoigawa (25,000 koku) in Echigo Province; then, in 1627, his holding was transferred to Mōka Domain (65,000 koku) in Shimotsuke Province. Masanari's descendants resided successively at Odawara Domain (105,000 koku) in Sagami Province from 1632 through 1685; at Takata Domain in Echigo Province from 1685 through 1701; at Sakura Domain in Shimōsa Province from 1701 through 1723.

Masanobu's heirs and others who were also descendants of Inaba Masanari settled at Yodo Domain (115,000 koku) in Yamashiro Province from 1723 through 1868.

The head of this clan line was ennobled as a "Viscount" in the Meiji period.

== Tokugawa official ==
Masanobu was the Tokugawa shogunate's Kyoto shoshidai in the period spanning March 4, 1804 through October 5, 1806.
