= Inaba Masakatsu =

Seventeenth century daimyō

Inaba Masakatsu 稲葉正勝
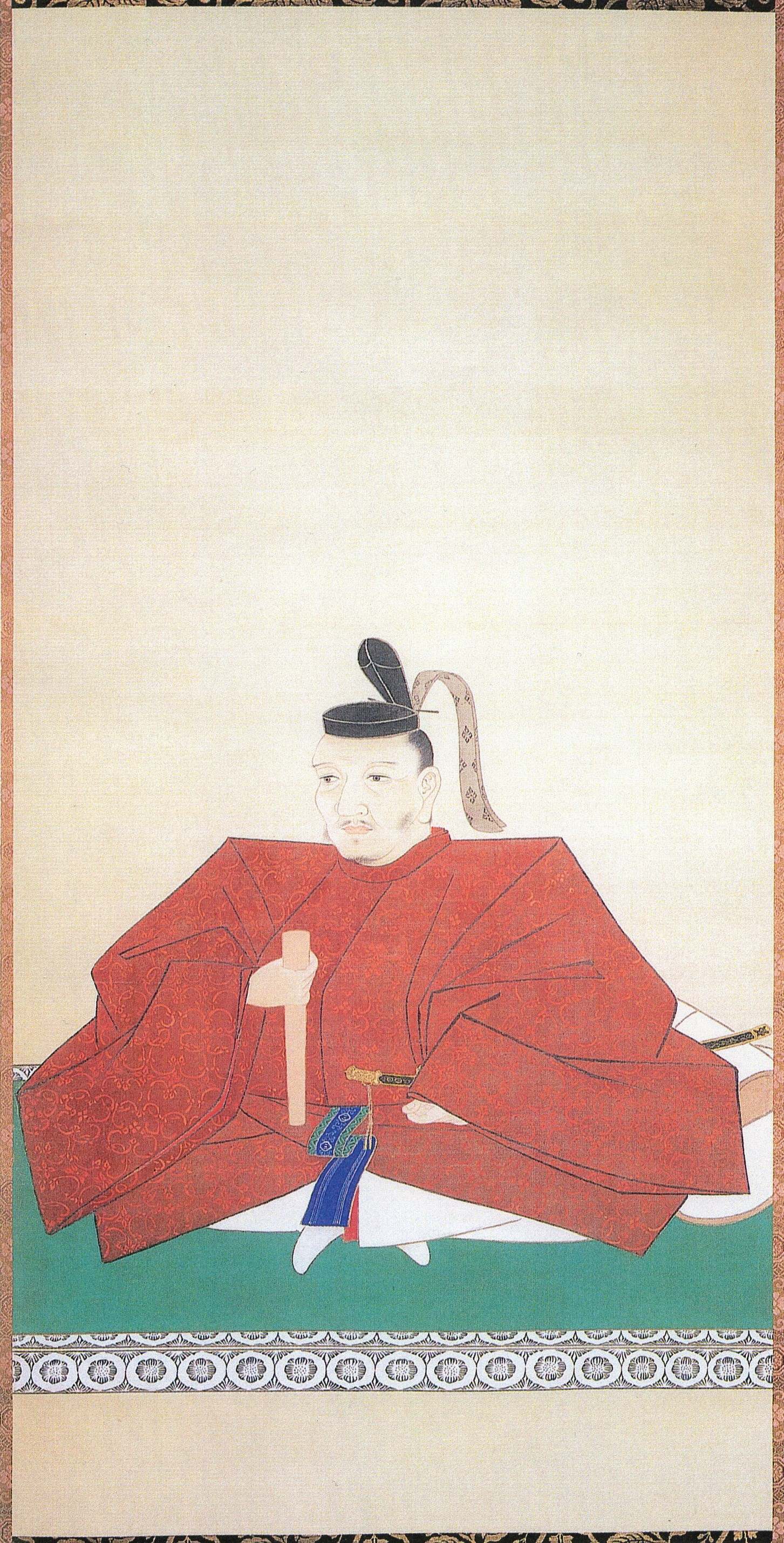
- Portrait of Masakatsu Inaba
- Born: 1597
- Died: 22 February 1634 (aged 36–37); Kumamoto, Japan
- Occupation: daimyō

Inaba Masakatsu (稲葉 正勝; 1597 – 22 February 1634) was a daimyō of early Edo-period Japan, who ruled Kakioka (Shimōsa Province) and Mōka (Shimotsuke Province), and was finally transferred to Odawara Domain in Sagami Province.

== Biography ==
Inaba Masakatsu was the eldest son of Kasuga no Tsubone, the wet nurse to shōgun Tokugawa Iemitsu. He was raised with Iemitsu as one of his childhood playmates and confidants. In 1624, he received a 5000-koku estate in Makabe District, Hitachi Province, which, added to his existing holdings, propelled him past the 10,000 koku mark to become a daimyō. Kakioka Domain in Shimōsa Province was created to be his title. However, on the death of his father Inaba Masanari in 1628, Masakatsu became head of the Inaba clan, and inherited his father's position as daimyō of Mōka Domain, at which time Kakioka Domain was abolished. Masakatsu was again transferred four years later to Odawara Domain. In 1632, he was assigned to assist Katō Tadahiro in the reconstruction of Kumamoto Castle. However, in the summer of 1633, while still at Kumamoto, he fell ill and vomited blood. He died the following year.

New title	Daimyō of Kakioka; 1624–1628	Abolished
Preceded by Inaba Masanari	Daimyō of Mōka; 1628–1632	Succeeded by
Preceded by Hori Chikayoshi	Daimyō of Odawara; 1632–1634	Succeeded by Inaba Masanori
