= Inaba Masakuni =

Japanese daimyō of the late-Edo period (1834–1898)

Viscount Inaba Masakuni
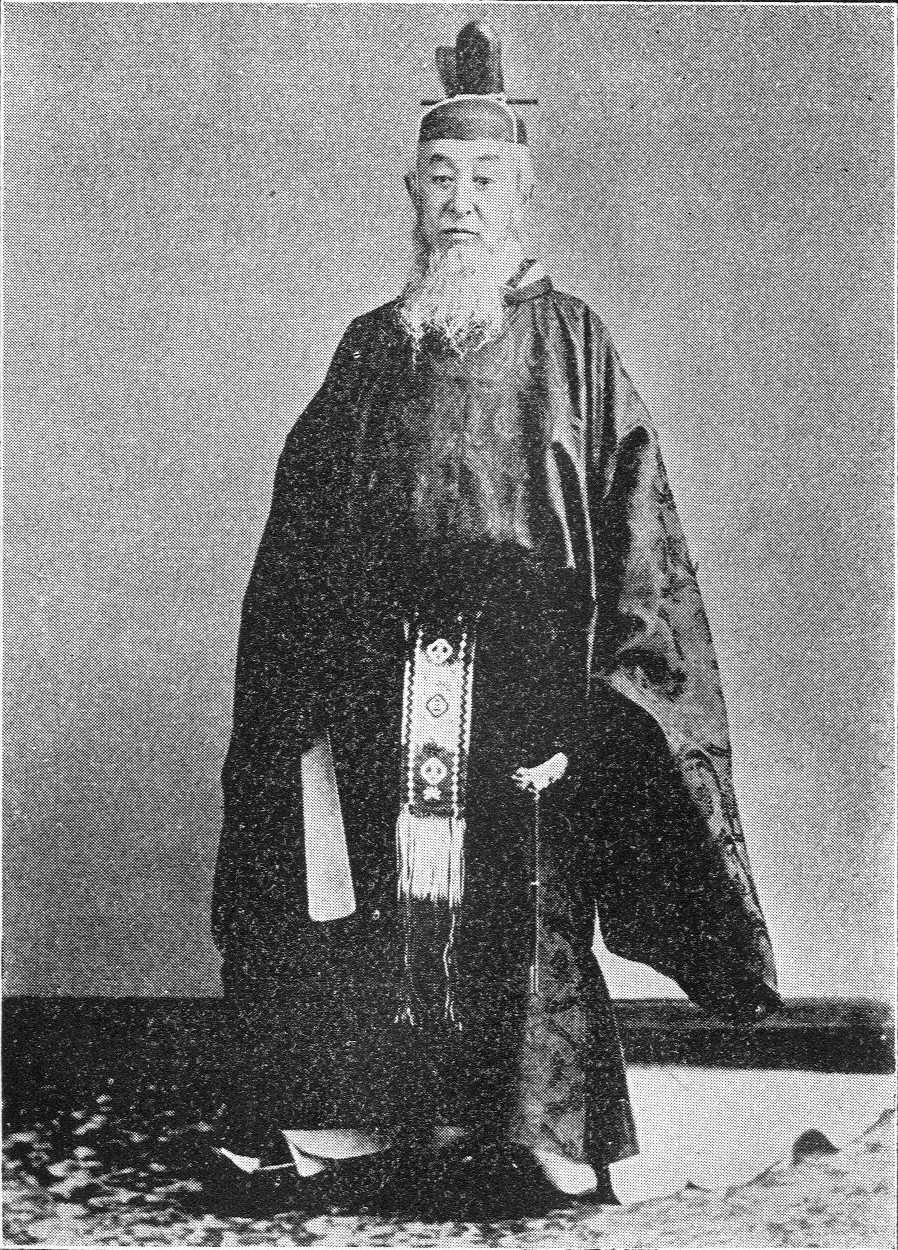

12th Daimyō of Yodo
- In office 1848–1871
- Preceded by: Inaba Masayoshi
- Succeeded by: none

Personal details
- Born: July 26, 1834 Edo, Japan
- Died: July 15, 1898 (aged 63)

Viscount Inaba Masakuni (稲葉 正邦; July 26, 1834 – July 15, 1898) was a Japanese daimyō of the late-Edo period. In the Edo period, the Makino were identified as one of the fudai or insider daimyō clans which were hereditary vassals or allies of the Tokugawa clan, in contrast with the tozama or outsider clans.

== Inaba clan genealogy ==
The fudai Inaba clan originated in Mino Province. They claim descent from Kōno Michitaka (d. 1374), who claimed descent from Emperor Kammu (736–805). Masakuni was part of the cadet branch of the Inaba which was created in 1588. This branch is descended from Inaba Masanari, who fought in the armies of Nobunaga and then Hideyoshi. In 1619, Masanari was granted the han of Itoigawa (25,000 koku) in Echigo Province; then, in 1627, his holding was transferred to Mōka Domain (65,000 koku) in Shimotsuke Province. Masanari's descendants resided successively at Odawara Domain (105,000 koku) in Sagami Province from 1632 through 1685; at Takata Domain in Echigo Province from 1685 through 1701; at Sakura Domain in Shimōsa Province from 1701 through 1723.

Masakuni's heirs and others who were also descendants of Inaba Masanari settled at Yodo Domain (115,000 koku) in Yamashiro Province from 1723 through 1868. The head of this clan line was ennobled as a "Viscount" in the Meiji period.

== Tokugawa official ==
Masakuni served in a variety of positions in the Tokugawa shogunate. He was the shōgun's representative, the Kyoto shoshidai in the period spanning July 26, 1863, through May 16, 1864. During the Battle of Toba–Fushimi, he refused the entry of pro-Shogunate forces into Yodo, and thus helped tip the balance in the favor of the Satsuma and Chōshū forces.

He was made a viscount in the Meiji period, and served as a Shinto priest and government official.

== Notes ==
Preceded by Inaba Masayoshi	12th (Inaba) Daimyō of Yodo; 1848–1871	Succeeded by none
Preceded by Makino Tadayuki	55th Kyoto Shoshidai; 1863–1864	Succeeded by Matsudaira Sadaaki
