= Masakuni =

- Gender: Male

Origin
- Origin: Japanese
- Meaning: Different meanings depending on the kanji used

Masakuni (written: 正邦, 昌邦 or 真邦) is a masculine Japanese given name. Notable people with the name include:

- Chikubayama Masakuni (竹葉山 真邦; born 1957), Japanese sumo wrestler
- Inaba Masakuni (稲葉 正邦; 1834–1898), Japanese daimyō
- Masakuni Yamamoto (山本 昌邦; born 1958), Japanese footballer and manager
