= Mochiaki =

- Gender: Male

Origin
- Origin: Japanese
- Meaning: Different meanings depending on the kanji used

Mochiaki (written: 茂韶 or 茂昭) is a masculine Japanese given name. Notable people with the name include:

- Hachisuka Mochiaki (蜂須賀 茂韶) (1846–1918), Japanese daimyō and diplomat
- Matsudaira Mochiaki (松平 茂昭) (1836–1890), Japanese daimyō
