= Inaba Masanori =

Japanese daimyō

Inaba Masanori 稲葉正則
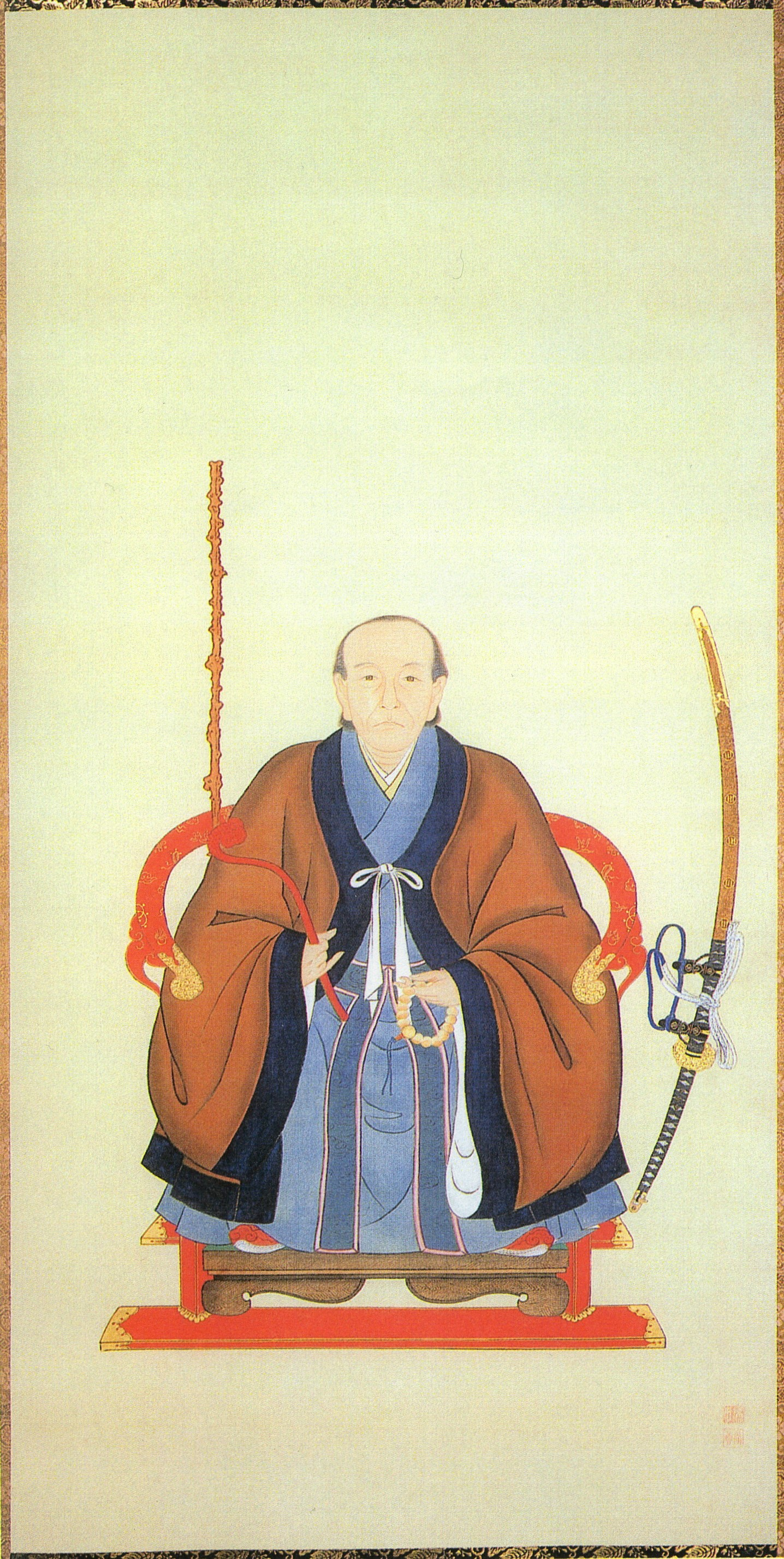
- Born: June 29, 1623
- Died: July 4, 1696 (aged 73)
- Occupation: Daimyō of Odawara Domain (1634–1683)
- Spouse: daughter of Mōri Hidemoto

Inaba Masanori (稲葉 正則; June 29, 1623 – July 4, 1696) was a daimyō of Odawara Domain in Sagami Province (modern-day Kanagawa Prefecture) in early-Edo period Japan. His courtesy title was Mino no Kami.

== Biography ==
Inaba Masanori was the second son of the previous daimyō of Odawara, Inaba Masakatsu. As his mother died when he was still very young, he was raised by his grandmother, Kasuga no Tsubone, the wet nurse to shōgun Tokugawa Iemitsu. On the death of his father in 1634, he became head of the Inaba clan, and inherited his father's position as daimyō of Odawara. Due to the influence of his grandmother, he rose rapidly through the hierarchy of the Tokugawa shogunate and was appointed Rōjū under Shogun Tokugawa Ietsuna on December 8, 1681. On May 27, 1683, he retired from public life, turning his domain over to his son, Inaba Masamichi.

Preceded by Inaba Masakatsu	Daimyō of Odawara; 1634–1683	Succeeded by Inaba Masamichi
