= Masanari =

- Gender: Male

Origin
- Word/name: Japanese
- Meaning: Different meanings depending on the kanji used

Masanari (written: 正也, 正就, 正成, 雅也 or 雅誠) is a masculine Japanese given name. Notable people with the name include:

- Hattori Masanari (服部 正就, 1565–1615), Japanese samurai
- Inaba Masanari (稲葉 正成, 1571–1628), Japanese samurai
- Masanari Mochida (持田 雅誠, born 1972), Japanese slalom canoeist
- Masanari Nihei (二瓶 正也, born 1940), Japanese actor
- Masanari Omura (大村 真也, born 1984), Japanese footballer
- Masanari Shintaku (新宅 雅也, born 1957), Japanese long-distance runner
