= Katō Mitsuyasu =

- 加藤 光泰
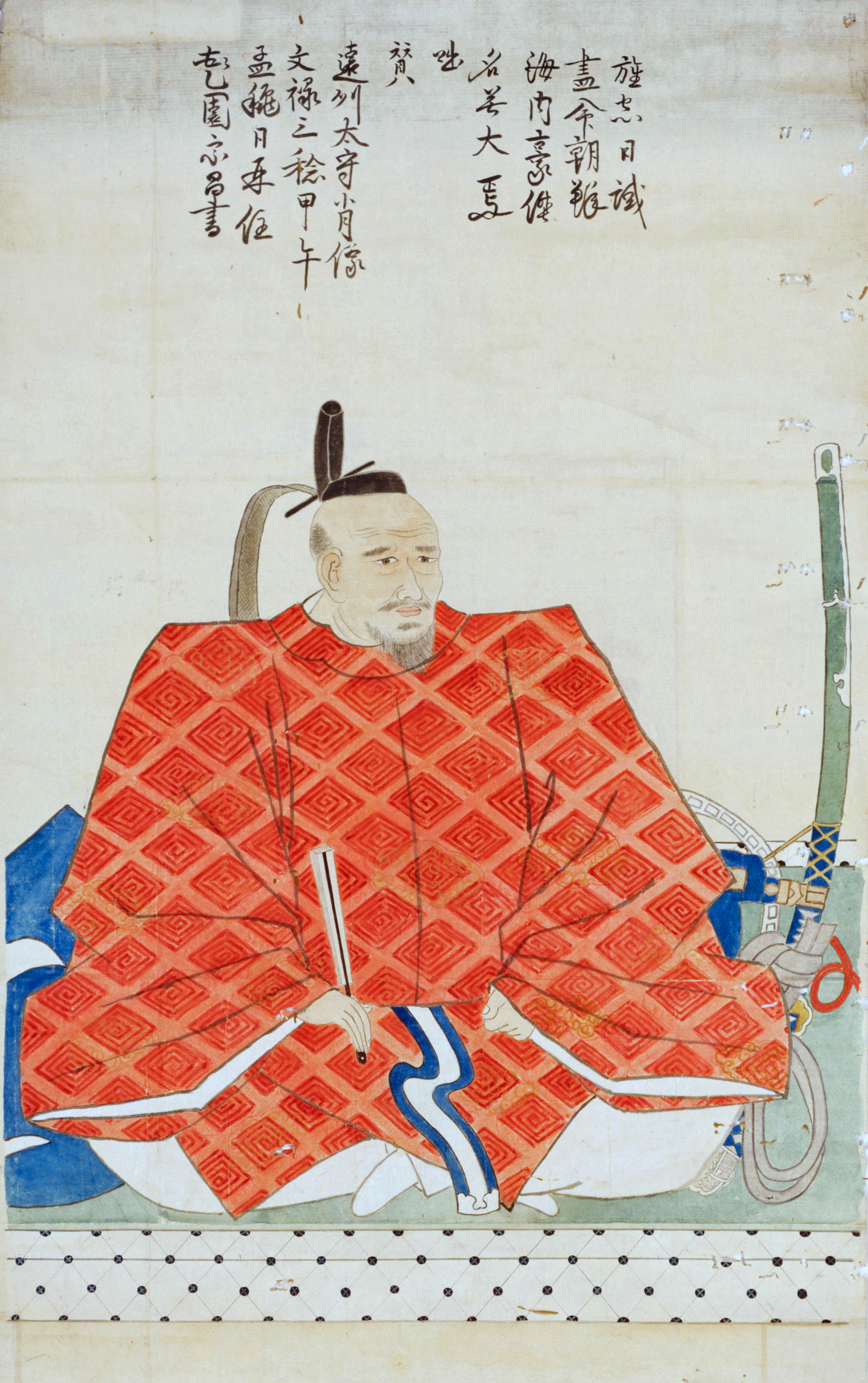
- Born: 1537
- Died: September 24, 1593 (aged 55–56); Mino Province
- Military career
- Allegiance: Saito clan Oda clan Toyotomi clan
- Conflicts: Battle of Nagaragawa (1556); Battle of Yamazaki (1582); Korean Campaign (1592)

Katō Mitsuyasu (加藤 光泰; 1537 – September 24, 1593) was a retainer under the Toyotomi clan during the late Sengoku period of feudal Japan. Residing within Mino Province during his early life, Mitsuyasu took up arms in support of the Saitō clan and its leader, Saitō Dōsan.

When Saitō Tatsuoki succeeded to the clan leadership, Mitsuyasu defected to Oda Nobunaga in 1567, expanding under the latter's rulership for many years following.

Rising to become a general while under the service of Toyotomi Hideyoshi by the 1580s, he fought in the Battle of Yamazaki 1582.

Mitsuyasu was rewarded with property valued at 240,000 koku within Ōmi Province, encouraging him to serve under his lord throughout the first Korean campaign in 1592 and 1593.

In 1593, following his participation in the Korean campaign, Mitsuyasu died of a sudden illness while returning home. At the time of his death, he was beginning construction on Kurono Castle in Mino Province, but his death passed control of the castle to his son, Katō Sadayasu, who completed the construction.
