= Aono Domain =

Japanese domain of the Edo period

The Aono Domain (青野藩, Aono-han) was a short-lived Japanese domain of the Edo period, located in Mino Province (modern-day Gifu Prefecture). It existed briefly in the 17th century, and was ruled by the Inaba clan.

== List of Lords ==
- Inaba clan (Fudai; 12,000 koku)
1. Masatsugu
2. Masayoshi
3. Masayasu
