= Inaba clan =

Inaba 稲葉
- Inaba clan Family crest (kamon)
- Home province: Mino
- Parent house: Kōno clan
- Titles: daimyō, viscount
- Founder: Emperor Kanmu via Kōno Michitaka
- Final ruler: Inaba Masakuni
- Founding year: 14th century
- Dissolution: still extant
- Ruled until: 1873 (Abolition of the han system)
- Cadet branches: two cadet branches to the Meiji Restoration

The Inaba clan (Japanese: 稲葉氏, Hepburn: Inaba-shi) were a samurai kin group which rose to prominence in the Sengoku period and the Edo periods. Under the Tokugawa shogunate, the Inaba, as hereditary vassals of the Tokugawa clan, were classified as one of the fudai daimyō clans.

== Inaba clan genealogy ==
The Inaba clan originated in 16th century Mino Province, and claimed descent from Kōno Michitaka (died 1374), who claimed descent from Emperor Kanmu (736–805).

=== Main branch ===
The senior branch of the Inaba are descended from Inaba Sadamichi (1551–1606), who was raised in rank by Oda Nobunaga in 1564. He was established in 1585 at Hachiman Domain (40,000 koku) in Mino Province. In 1600, he and his heirs were installed at Usuki Domain (56,000 koku) in Bungo Province, and his descendants remained in the same place until the Meiji Restoration in 1868. The head of this clan line was ennobled as a viscount (hakushaku) under the kazoku peerage in the Meiji period.

=== Main branch head family ===
1. Inaba Michisada
2. Inaba Michinori
3. Inaba Yoshimichi (1515-1589)
4. Inaba Sadamichi (1546–1603)
5. Inaba Norimochi (1566–1626)
6. Inaba Kazumichi (1587–1641)
7. Inaba Nobumichi (1608–1673)
8. Inaba Kagemichi (1639–1694)
9. Inaba Tomomichi (1652–1706)
10. Inaba Tsunemichi (1690–1720)
11. Inaba Masamichi (1706–1737)
12. Inaba Yasumichi (1730–1768)
13. Inaba Hiromichi (1752–1818)
14. Inaba Terumichi (1776–1847)
15. Inaba Takamichi (1801–1821)
16. Inaba Chikamichi (1815–1844)
17. Inaba Akimichi (1839–1862)
18. Inaba Hisamichi (1843–1893)
19. Inaba Yukimichi
20. Inaba Naomichi
21. Inaba Takeo
22. Inaba Lilika Rea (2001–)

=== Cadet lines ===
- A cadet branch descended from Inaba Masanari (1571–1628), who fought in the armies of Oda Nobunaga and then Toyotomi Hideyoshi. This branch of the Inaba was created in 1588. In 1619, following the establishment of the Tokugawa shogunate, Inaba Masanari was forced to divorce his wife, in order for her to become the wet-nurse of future Shōgun Tokugawa Iemitsu (Kasuga-no-Tsubone. He was granted Itoigawa Domain (25,000 koku) in Echigo Province in return; then, in 1627, his holding was transferred to Mōka Domain (65,000 koku) in Shimotsuke Province. His descendants resided successively at Odawara Domain (105,000 koku) in Sagami Province from 1632 through 1685, at Takada Domain in Echigo province from 1685 through 1701, and at Sakura Domain in Shimōsa Province from 1701 through 1723. Inaba Masanari's heirs settled at Yodo Domain (115,000 koku) in Yamashiro Province from 1723 through 1868. The head of this clan line was ennobled as a viscount in the Meiji period.
- Another cadet branch of the Inaba clan was created in 1781. From 1785 through 1868, this branch of the clan continued to live at Tateyama Domain (10,000 koku) in Awa Province. The head of this clan line was ennobled as a viscount in the Meiji period.

== Clan temple ==
Tōzen-ji, a Buddhist temple in Edo, was considered the family temple of various clans, including the main branch of the Inaba clan.

== Notable members ==
- Inaba Masanari (1571 – October 14, 1628)
- Inaba Masayasu (1640–1684), Wakadoshiyori and assassin of Tairō Hotta Masatoshi
- Inaba Masamichi (1623–1696), 7th Kyoto shoshidai.
- Inaba Masanobu (1749–1806), 34th Kyoto shoshidai.
- Inaba Masami (1815–1879), Wakadoshiyori, Rōjū, Commissioner of the Army and Fleet Admiral of the Tokugawa Navy
- Inaba Masakuni (1834–1898), 55th Kyoto shoshidai.
