= Matsudaira Mochiaki =

Daimyo of the late Edo period; 7th lord of Itoigawa and 17th lord of Fukui

- 松平 茂昭
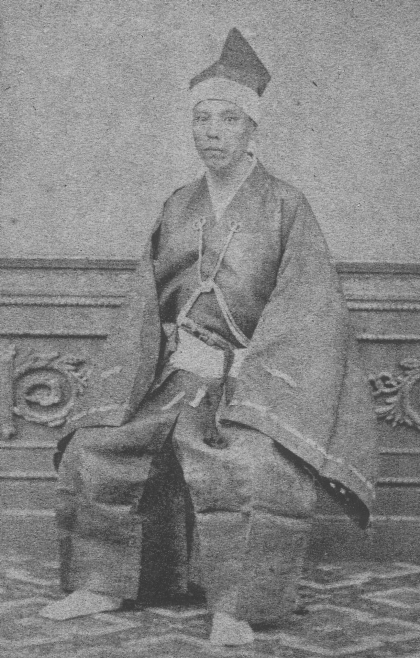
- Matsudaira Mochiaki
- Born: September 17, 1836
- Died: July 25, 1890 (aged 53)
- Other names

7th Daimyō of Itoigawa Domain
- In office 1857–1858
- Preceded by: Matsudaira Naoharu
- Succeeded by: Matsudaira Naoyasu

17th Daimyō of Fukui Domain
- In office 1858–1871
- Preceded by: Matsudaira Yoshinaga
- Succeeded by: -abolished-
- Spouse(s): Takatsukasa Kayo, later Kuga Yukiko
- Father: Matsudaira Naoharu

Matsudaira Mochiaki (松平 茂昭; 17 September 1836 – 25 July 1890) was a Bakumatsu period daimyō under the Edo period Tokugawa shogunate of Japan. He was the 7th daimyō of Itoigawa Domain in Echigo Province and later the 17th (and final) daimyō of Fukui Domain in Echizen Province.

== Biography ==
Mochiaki was the fourth son of Matsudaira Naoharu of Itoigawa. He was received in formal audience by Shōgun Tokugawa Ieyoshi in 1852. His childhood name was Yuanosuke (鑜之助). He underwent his genpuku ceremony in 1853, becoming Matsudaira Naokiyo (直廉). On the retirement of his father in 1857, he became daimyō of Itoigawa. At that time, his courtesy title was Hyūga-no-kami and his court rank was Junior Fifth Rank, Upper Grade.

In 1858, Matsudaira Yoshinaga (better known as Matsudaira Shungaku) was forced into retirement during the Ansei Purge, and Naokiyo was transferred to Fukui Domain and was adopted as Yoshinaga's successor. His courtesy title became Echizen-no-kami, and also Sakon'e-no-chūjō, and his court rank was increased to Junior Fourth Rank, Upper Grade. Also, Shōgun Tokugawa Iemochi granted him a kanji from his name, which then became Matsudaira Mochiaki. Uni 1864, his court rank became Senior Fourth Rank, Lower Grade.

However, he was mostly a figurehead within Fukui Domain, as the retired Matsudaira Yoshinaga continued to exert much influence, and all of the powerful retainers of the domain, including Yuri Kimimasa, Yokoi Shōnan, etc. continued to be loyal to their former lord.

During the First Chōshū expedition, he served as deputy commander under the overall command of Tokugawa Yoshikatsu.

In June 1869, he defected to the side of the new Meiji government and was appointed imperial governor of Fukui, a post which he held to the abolition of the han system in 1871. In 1884, he became a Count (hakushaku) in the kazoku peerage system. He was awarded the Fourth class of the Order of the Rising Sun in 1885. In 1889, he inherited the title of Marquis (koshaku) from his adopted father.

He died in 1890. His son, Matsudaira Yasutaka (1867–1930) served as a member of the House of Peers of the Diet of Japan and was author of a number of works on agricultural science, having studied for several years in England.

== Family ==
- Father: Matsudaira Naoharu (1810–1878)
- Wives:
  - Yuki-hime, daughter of Kuga Takemichi
  - Ikuhime, daughter of Hirohashi Tanetatsu
- Children:
  - Matsudaira Yasutaka
  - Matsudaira Nagayori
  - Takeya Harumitsu
  - Fujinami Shigeuji
  - Kiyohime, married Nabeshima Naoyasu
  - Keihime, married Kato Yasumichi
  - Akihime, married Toda Yasukei

== Notes ==
Preceded by Matsudaira Naoharu	7th Daimyō of Itoigawa; 1857–1858	Succeeded by Matsudaira Naoyasu
Preceded by Matsudaira Yoshinaga	17th Daimyō of Fukui; 1858–1871	Succeeded by domain is abolished
