= Inaba Masamichi =

Japanese daimyō (1640–1716)

Inaba Masamichi 稲葉正往
- Born: December 22, 1640
- Died: November 22, 1716 (aged 75)
- Occupation: Daimyō

Inaba Masamichi (稲葉 正則; December 22, 1640 – November 22, 1716) was a daimyō of Odawara Domain in Sagami Province (modern-day Kanagawa Prefecture) in early-Edo period Japan, until 1686 when he was transferred to Takada Domain in Echigo Province. Later he was transferred again, to Sakura Domain in Shimōsa Province. His courtesy title was Mino no Kami.

== Biography ==
Inaba Masamichi was the eldest son of the previous daimyō of Odawara, Inaba Masanori. Due to the influence of the Tairō Sakai Tadakiyo, he rose rapidly through the hierarchy of the Tokugawa shogunate. He was appointed concurrently as a Sōshaban (Master of Ceremonies) and Jisha-bugyō on April 9, 1681, and received another concurrent appointment as Kyoto Shoshidai on December 24 of the same year.

On the retirement of his father in 1683, he became head of the Inaba clan, and inherited his father’s position as daimyō of Odawara (102,000 koku). His cousin, Inaba Masayasu, served as a wakadoshiyori in Edo. Masayasu visited Kyoto as part of a formal inspection in 1683.

However, in 1685, Masamichi was ordered to resign his position as Kyoto Shoshidai and to transfer from Odawara to Takada Domain in Echigo Province (103,000 koku).

On January 11, 1701, Masamichi became a Rōjū under shōgun Tokugawa Tsunayoshi, and in June of that year was transferred to Sakura Domain in Shimōsa Province (103,000 koku).

On August 7, 1707, he retired from public life, turning his domain over to his son Inaba Masatomo. He died in 1716, and his grave is at the temple of Yōgen-ji in Bunkyō, Tokyo.

== Notes ==
Preceded by Toda Tadazane	Daimyō of Sakura; 1701–1707	Succeeded by Inaba Masatomo
Preceded by none	Daimyō of Takada; 1685–1701	Succeeded by Toda Tadazane
Preceded by Inaba Masanori	Daimyō of Odawara; 1683–1685	Succeeded by Ōkubo Tadatomo
Preceded by Toda Tadamasa	7th Kyoto Shoshidai; 1681–1685	Succeeded by Tsuchiya Masanao
