= Kurono Castle =

Coordinates: 35°27′36.3″N 136°43′26.7″E

Kurono Castle 黒野城
- Gifu, Gifu Prefecture, Japan
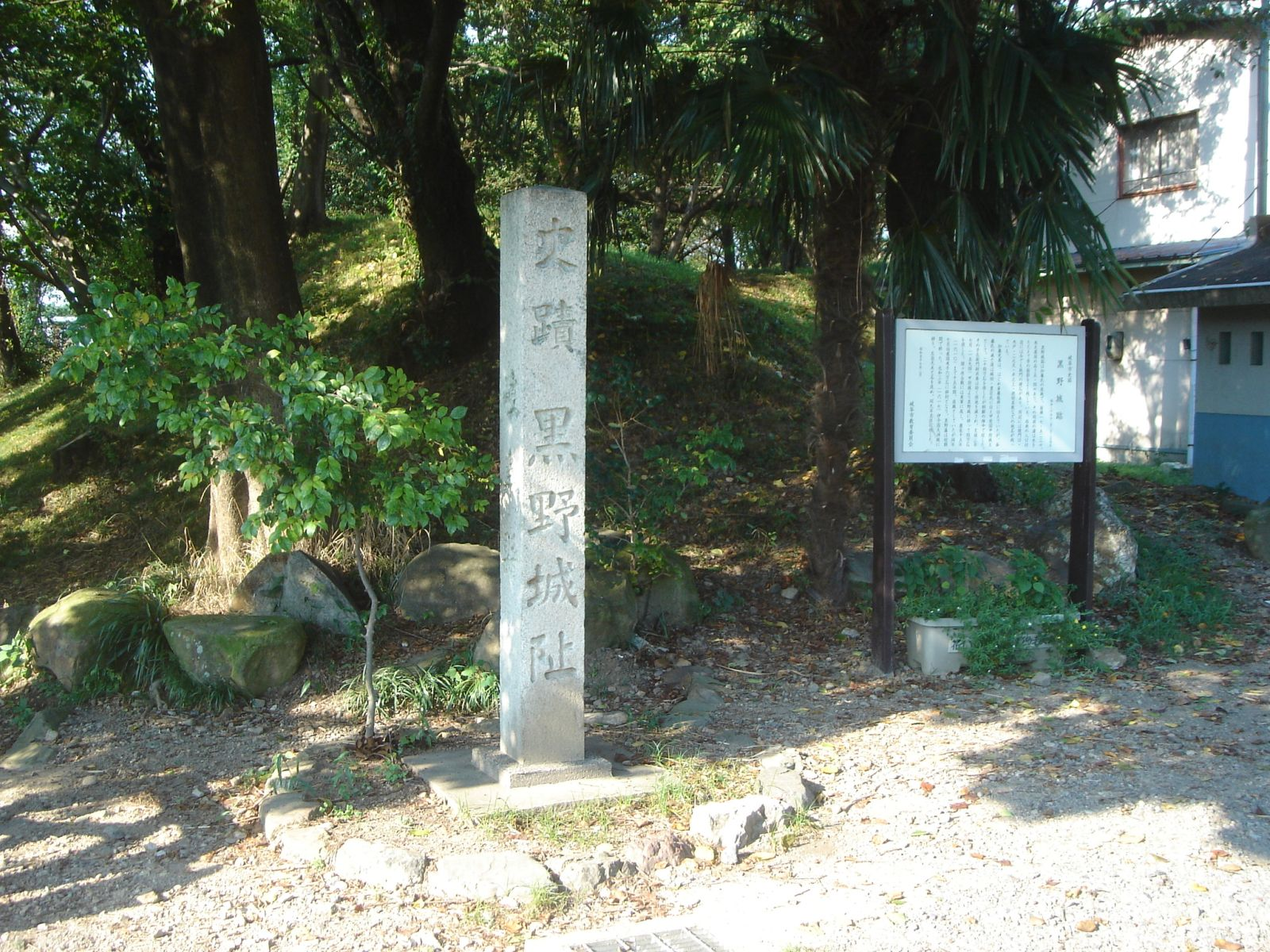
- Marker at Kurono Castle

Location

Site history
- Built: 1597
- Built by: Katō Sadayasu
- In use: 1597–1610
- Demolished: 1610

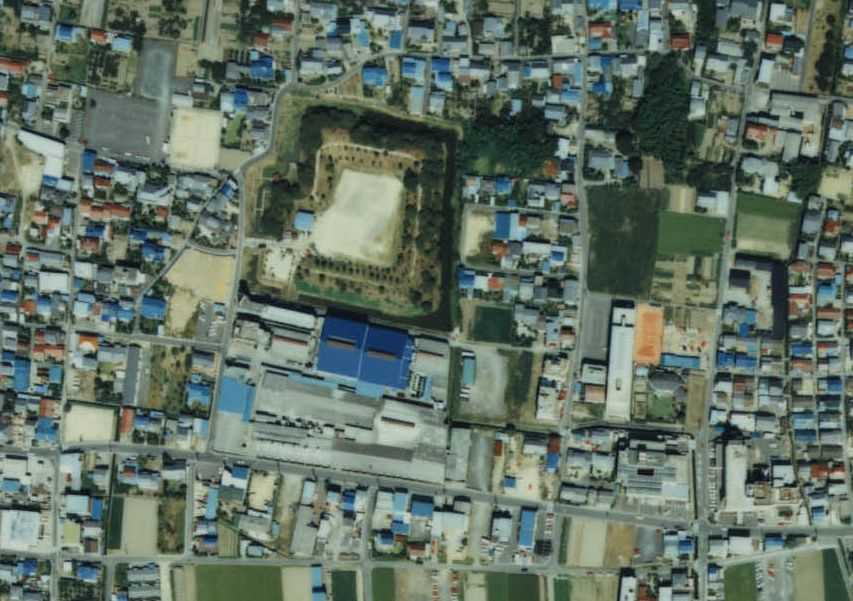
Aerial view of Kurono Castle

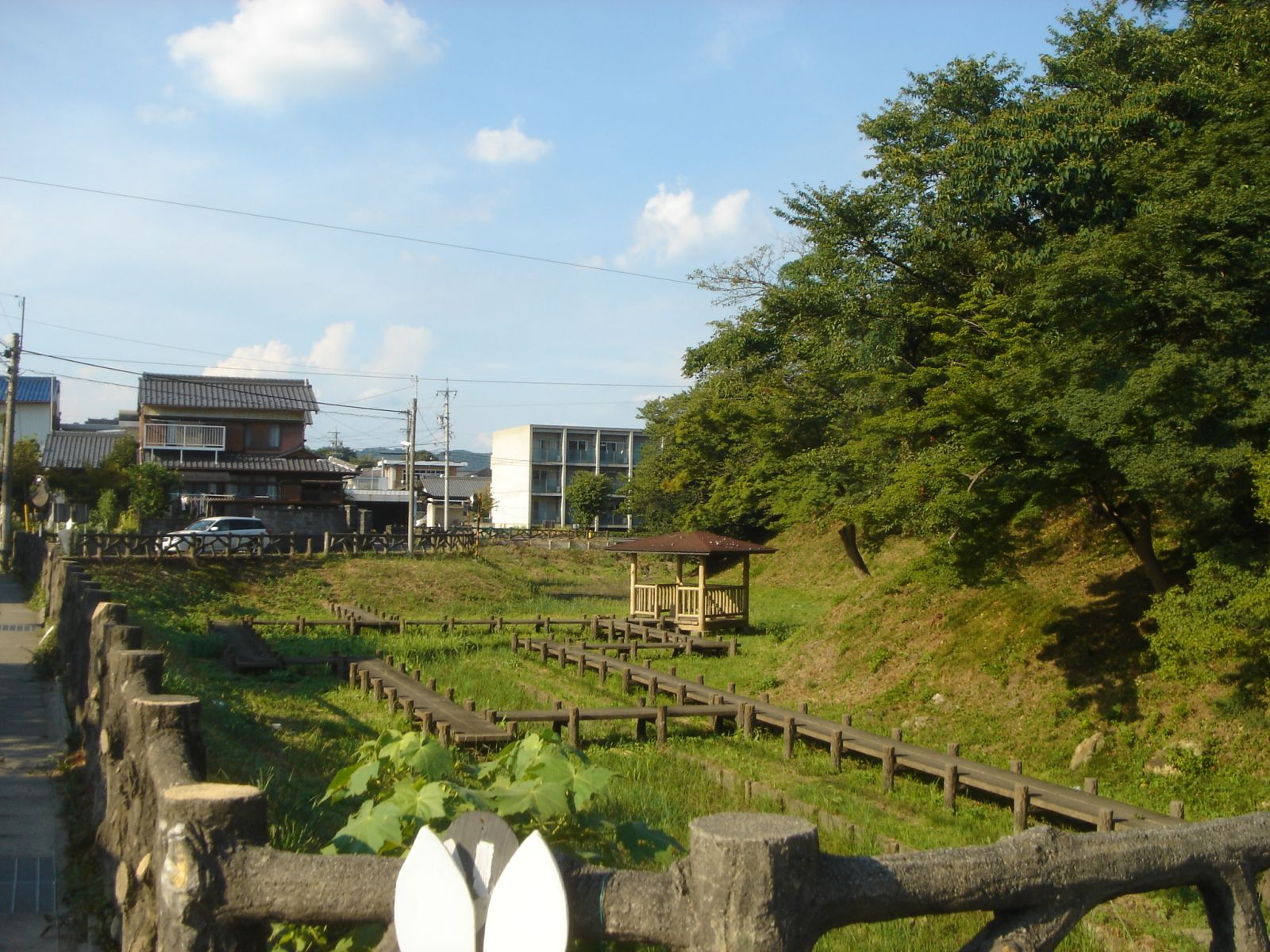
Outer moat of Kurono Castle

Though the castle spanned the Sengoku and Edo periods, it barely did so as the castle was demolished in 1610. The castle supported the Saitō, Oda and Toyotomi clans.

== History ==
The castle was built by Katō Sadayasu in 1597. Though Sadayasu supported the Toki clan, Katō Mitsuyasu, his father, supported the Saitō clan and Toyotomi Hideyoshi, who provided many of the stones for the construction of the castle. Mitsuyasu join in the invasions of Korea, but died of illness during his trip home in 1593, putting Sadayasu in charge of construction.

== Present ==
At present, there is a marker designating the former location of the castle. The surrounding area has been developed into a park. Though the donjon no longer exists, the moat, earthen walls and foundation stones still remain.
