= Lady Kasuga =

Japanese politician

Jōrō Otoshiyori 春日局 Kasuga no Tsubone
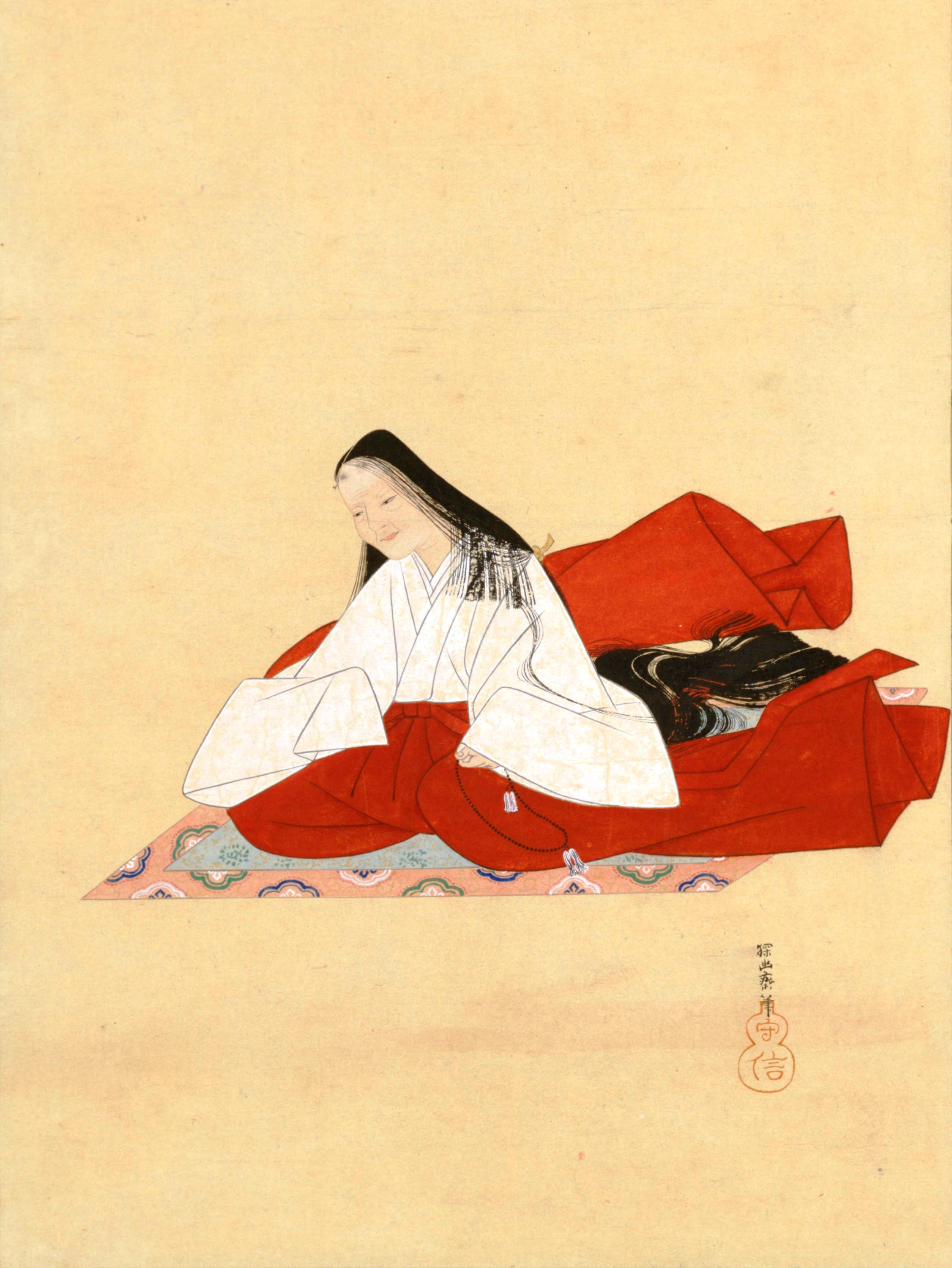
- Portrait of Lady Kasuga
- Born: Saitō Fuku (斉藤福); 1579; Tamba, Hyōgo Prefecture, Azuchi–Momoyama period (now Japan)
- Died: October 26, 1643 (aged 63–64); Edo Castle, Musashi, Japan
- Resting place: Bunkyō, Tokyo
- Spouse: Inaba Masanari
- Children: Inaba Masakatsu; Hotta Masatoshi (adopted) other son
- Father: Saitō Toshimitsu
- Relatives: Saitō clan Inaba clan Tokugawa clan
- Honours: Junior Second Rank (従二位, 1629)

Lady Kasuga (春日局, Kasuga no Tsubone; 1579 – October 26, 1643) was a Japanese noble lady and politician from a prominent Japanese samurai family of the Azuchi–Momoyama and Edo periods. Born Saitō Fuku (斉藤福), she was a daughter of Saitō Toshimitsu (who was a retainer of Akechi Mitsuhide). She was the wet nurse of the third Tokugawa shōgun Iemitsu. Lady Kasuga was one of the best politicians in the Edo period. She stood in front of negotiations with the Imperial Court and contributed to the stabilization of the Tokugawa Shogunate.

Kasuga was one of the most powerful figures in the Ōoku (the quarters in Edo Castle where the women related to the Shogun family resided) . She is counted alongside Matsudaira Nobutsuna and Yagyu Muneyori as one of the Three Tripod Legs, who supported and propped up Iemitsu.

== Early career ==
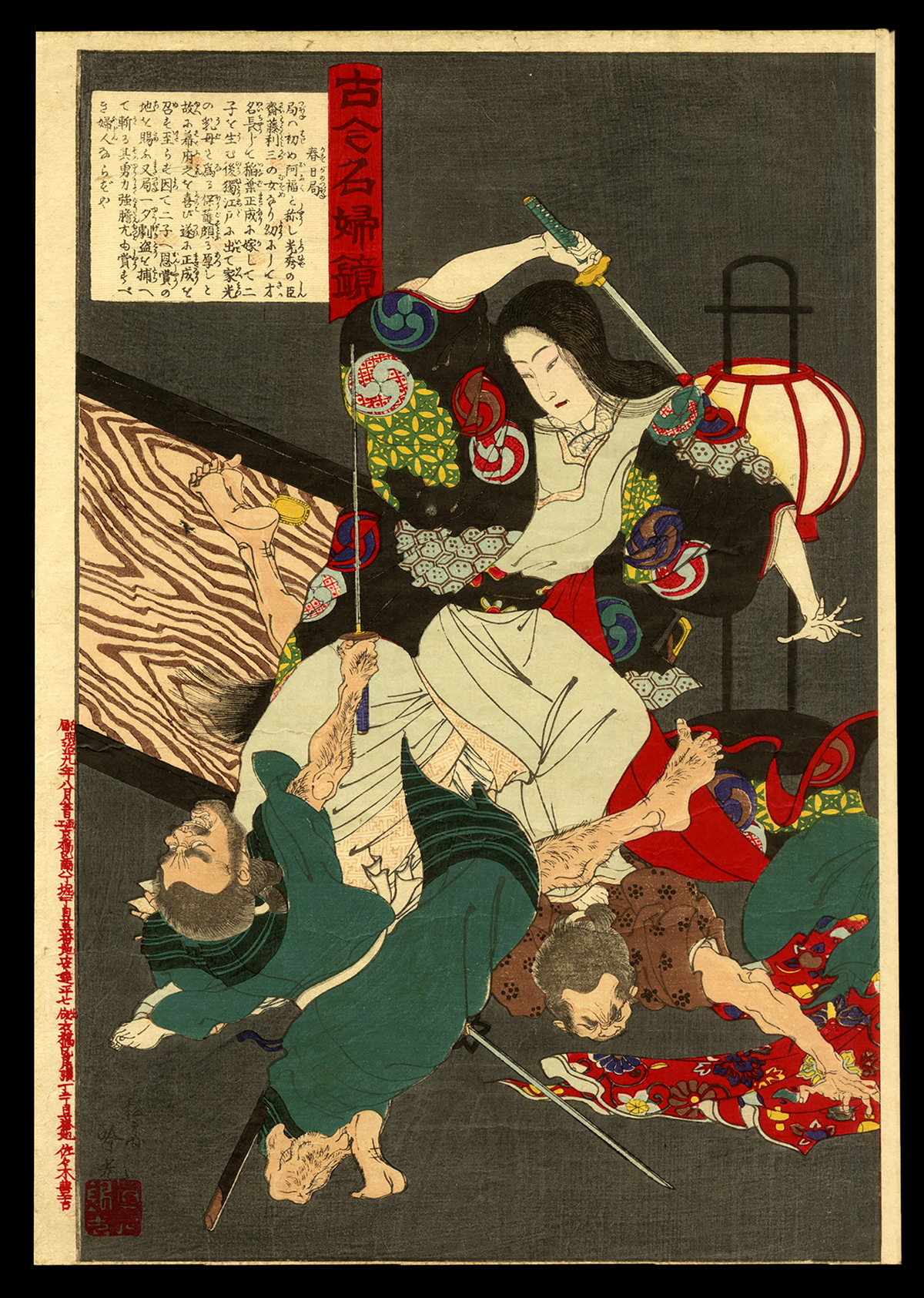
Kasuga no Tsubone fighting robbers - Adachi Ginko (c.1880)

Saitō Fuku was from the Saitō clan, a prominent samurai house that had served for generations as deputy military governors of Mino province. She was born in Kuroi Castle of Tanba province (comprising modern-day Hyogo and Kyoto Prefectures), which is where her father's territory was then located. Tanba Province was under the overlordship of Akechi Mitsuhide, and her father, Saitō Toshimitsu, as his retainer, was enfeoffed on that territory by Mitsuhide. Her mother's father was Inaba Yoshimichi.

Fuku's father joined Akechi Mitsuhide's rebellion to kill Oda Nobunaga during the Honnō-ji Incident. After Nobunaga was assassinated by Mitsuhide, the Saito and Akechi clan were defeated by Hashiba Hideyoshi during the Battle of Yamazaki. Then Fuku's father, Toshimitsu, retired to his castle; later he was caught in Omi province, near Sakamoto Castle, and was executed. It is thought that his various brothers, having become defeated and hunted warriors, wandered from place to place trying to escape the enemy. One theory holds that after the Battle of Yamazaki, she had relied on Chosokabe Motochika, her uncle, for help, and had spent some time at Oko Castle in Tosa province

Because Fuku was a woman, she was spared execution and was raised by her maternal relative, aristocrat Sanjonishi Kinkuni. After being adopted, she received the highest education as an aristocrat of the privileged class. She learned the arts considered essential for the nobles of the Imperial court, including the arts of calligraphy, waka poetry and mixing incense.

She was later adopted by her uncle, Inaba Shigemichi, and became the wife of Inaba Masanari, a retainer of Kobayakawa Hidekai During the marriage she had three sons, including Inaba Masakatsu, and an adopted son, Hotta Masatoshi.

== Joining the Tokugawa clan ==
In 1600, during the Sekigahara campaign, Fuku's husband, Inaba Masanari, served Kobayakawa Hideaki in the Western army led by Ishida Mitsunari. Due to the tensions Hideaki had with Mitsunari and the progression of the war being favorable to the Eastern army led by Tokugawa Ieyasu, it is said that Fuku and Masanari achieved the great feat of making Hideaki change sides and join the Eastern army. After Hideaki joined Ieyasu, Mitsunari's army was defeated, as a result of which the Fuku family obtained a large amount of spoils of war.

After that, she took the step of divorcing her husband Masanari to become a wet nurse in the shogunal family and, in 1604, was formally appointed as the wet nurse of Takechiyo (the childhood name of Tokugawa Iemitsu), the legitimate son and heir of the second shogun, Tokugawa Hidetada. She was recommended to Tokugawa Ieyasu by Itakura Katsushige for the position of wet nurse for Tokugawa Iemitsu, but there is a theory that Ieyasu chose her on his own. They say that Fuku's excellent pedigree, refined and aristocratic education and the military exploits of her ex-husband Masanari were all positive factors in her selection as a wet nurse. She was chosen for the job as a payment because she helped persuade Kobayakawa Hideaki to join the Eastern Army in the Battle of Sekigahara.

== Shogun's wet-nurse ==
Lady Kasuga joined the Tokugawa clan as a wet nurse to Tokugawa Iemitsu, heir of Tokugawa Hidetada. During her lifetime she accumulated high political prestige, being responsible for numerous negotiations with the Imperial court, maintenance in the shogunate cabinet, hiring officials and stabilizing the Ooku system.

According to "Kasuga no Tsubone Ryakufu", biography that was completed in 1686 after Iemitsu's death, Lady Kasuga protested against Iemitsu - who had attempted suicide out of anguish that his parents, Hidetada and Oeyo, were very fond of the younger biological brother of Iemitsu, Tokugawa Tadanaga, and in 1615 she appealed directly to Tokugawa Ieyasu, who was retired living in Sunpu, asking him to confirm that the succession from the Shogunal would pass to Iemitsu. One theory holds that Lady Kasuga's direct petition to Ieyasu was rejected, and it was only after Ieyasu visited Edo Castle and saw the way Oeyo was worshiping his younger brother that he reconsidered.

On the other hand, she also established the Ōoku, the women's quarters, at Edo Castle; being appointed to the position of Jōrō Otoshiyori (上臈御年寄) or the senior ladyship, recommended by the first Midaidokoro, Oeyo, which gave her the right to decide all official business related to the Ooku, and as such her de facto power, backed by the Shogun's authority, exceeded that of the Shogun's Rōjū (Council of Elders).

In 1629, when Iemitsu was stricken with smallpox, she visited Ise Jingu Shrine to pray that he would be cured, Ofuku (Kasuga) traveled to the capital her way back where she had an audience with the Empress Meisho and Emperor Go-Mizunoo at the Imperial Court in Kyoto. But with her pedigree as a daughter of the Saito clan, a warrior house, Ofuku was not qualified to enter the imperial court, so she tried to arrange to be adopted by Sanjonishi Kinkuni, who was both her blood relative (Ofuku was the great-great-grandchild of Sanjonishi Kineda) and had raised her when she was younger. Kinkuni had already died, however, so she had no choice but to become a sister of Kinkuni's son Sanjonishi Saneeda instead; with this she was now qualified, as a full member of the aristocratic Sanjonishi family, to visit the palace, and succeeded in having an audience with Emperor Gomizunoo and with the Empress Kazuko, and was subsequently awarded the name 'Kasuga no Tsubone' and given the Junior Third Rank at court, and moreover was honored with tempai (sake given by the Emperor). Later she was promoted to the extraordinarily high Court rank of second class.

According to tradition, Lady Kasuga and Empress consort Tokugawa Masako (Oeyo and Hidetada's daughter) broke a taboo by visiting the imperial court dressed as commoners. It is alleged this caused Emperor Go-Mizunoo to abdicate in embarrassment, although the fallout over the "Purple Robe Incident" is perhaps a more likely reason for this event.

After the death of Oeyo (Iemitsu's mother), Kasuga no Tsubone exerted herself to the utmost to find consorts for him, convincing a succession of women including Eikoin, the abbess of Keiko-in Temple in Ise Province, as well as Hoju-in and Junsho-in, to enter the Ooku. During her life time, she had a fortune equivalent to over 100,000 koku.

== Death ==
Kasuga no Tsubone died in October 1643 at the age of 64. The poem she wrote upon her death reads, "As it sinks into the West, the moon beckons me to transcend the law; today at last, I shall surely escape the Burning House (a Buddhist metaphor for the current world of passions and agony)."

Her grave is in Rinshō-in, a temple in Bunkyō, Tokyo; the temple possesses a portrait of Kasuga by Kanō Tan'yū. The Kasuga neighborhood of Bunkyō takes its name from her. Another grave is in Odawara, Kanagawa Prefecture. Kasuga no Tsubone was of a comparable court rank position to Hojo Masako and Taira no Tokiko, being one of the most prominent figures of their time.

== Figures Lady Kasuga employed ==
- Sanjonishi Saneeda, who had created a plan by which Kasuga no Tsubone could visit the Imperial Palace, was appointed to the position of Buke tenso (the official in charge of communications between the shogunate and the Imperial Court) by the Court, and in the end rose to the position of Minister of the Right.
- Kasuga's descendant Maeda Harunaga was welcomed by the shogunate as a member of an elite family (a 'Koke'). From then on, he referred to himself as a member of the Maeda clan, with whom they had a connection.
- Eiko-in, whom Kasuga no Tsubone had fervently wanted to join the Ooku, was a daughter of the Rokujo clan, a family of waka poets who were associated with the Sanjonishi family.
- Kasuga's younger brother was also welcomed by the shogunate as a member of an elite family, so he began referring to himself as a member of the Toda clan, with whom they had a connection.
- Kasuga also endeavored to revive the fortunes of the Inaba clan, even arranging for her ex-husband Masanari Inaba, who had become a ronin (masterless samurai), to be adopted as a Karo (chief retainers) of Matsudaira Tadamasa; subsequently, he was promoted to the status of daimyo.
- Many of Iemitsu's pageboys managed to rise in rank as far as the rank of Roju (member of the Shogun's council of elders), and among this group many were relatives of Kasuga. Particularly famous is the case of her biological son Inaba Masakatsu and the case of Hotta Masamori, her grandson by marriage.
- When her niece Soshinni and her husband, Machino Yukikazu, became ronin as a result of the Kaieki (demotion) of his overlords, the Gamo clan, Kasuga no Tsubone employed Soshin-ni as her aide and arranged to have Soshinni's granddaughter (from a daughter who had married into another family) Jisho-in enter the O-oku. Ofuri became a concubine of Iemitsu and gave birth to Chiyohime. Yukikazu was also able to serve as a direct retainer of the shogun.
- Okaji no Kata (Ieyasu's trusted concubine) was employed by Kasuga after Ieyasu's death to raise children related to the Tokugawa clan.

== Honours ==
- Japanese Court Upper Rank: Junior Second Rank (従二位, 1629)

== Popular culture ==
- Jotei Kasuga no Tsubone (1990, directed by Sadao Nakajima)
- Kasuga no Tsubone (1989 NHK taiga drama) played by Reiko Ōhara.
- Ōoku (2004) portrayed by Yuki Matsushita
- Basilisk: The Kouga Ninja Scrolls (2005 anime and manga) voiced by Kimiko Saitō.
- Nioh (2017 video game) under her birth name Fuku, where she is an onmyōji apprenticed under Tenkai
- Fate/Grand Order (2015 video game) appeared in the in-game event Tokugawa Kaiten Meikyū - Ōoku as a major supporting character, she is fused with the Indian goddess Pārvatī and accompanied the player and their allies to navigate the fictionalize version of Ōoku that had been transformed into a labyrinth.

== See also ==
- List of female castellans in Japan
