= Hotta Masatoshi =

Japanese daimyō (1634–1684)

Hotta Masatoshi (堀田 正俊; December 31, 1634 – October 7, 1684) was a daimyō (feudal lord) in Shimōsa Province, and top government advisor and official in the Tokugawa shogunate of Japan. He served as rōjū (chief advisor) to shōgun Tokugawa Ietsuna from 1679 to 1680, and as Tairō (head of the rōjū council) under Tokugawa Tsunayoshi from the 12th day of the 11th lunar month of 1681 until his death on 7 October 1684.

== Life and career ==
Masatoshi's father was Hotta Masamori, advisor (Tairō) under the previous shōgun, Tokugawa Iemitsu, who committed seppuku upon Iemitsu's death in 1651. Masatoshi was then adopted by Iemitsu's nurse, Kasuga no Tsubone.

He served as personal secretary to the next shōgun, Tokugawa Ietsuna, for a time, before being appointed wakadoshiyori (junior councillor) in 1670. Ietsuna was already quite ill when Masatoshi was appointed rōjū in 1679, and died the following summer. At this time, another rōjū, Sakai Tadakiyo, in a bid for personal power, proposed that the next shōgun be selected from the princely houses. He sought to be regent to this new shōgun, who would be made a puppet ruler. However, Masatoshi, said to have been infuriated, voiced strong opposition to this scheme; Tadakiyo resigned his post shortly afterwards, and Ietsuna's brother Tokugawa Tsunayoshi was installed as the new shogun.

Masatoshi became Tairō soon afterwards, and was granted a domain worth 13,000 koku by Tsunayoshi.

== Death ==
Masatoshi was killed several years later, on 7 October 1684. The motives of the culprit, Masatoshi's cousin Inaba Masayasu, are unknown. Following Masatoshi's death, Tsunayoshi took the opportunity to reorganize the shogunate's offices so as to weaken the rōjū and grant additional powers to the Soba-yōnin (Chamberlains). Masatoshi was not succeeded as Tairō, and much of his power came to be wielded by the shōgun himself.

The reason for Hota Masatoshi's assassination is unknown. One theory is that Inaba Masatoshi was dismissed from the Yodogawa water control project in the third year of Tenwa (1683) and was dissatisfied with Masatoshi. Another theory is that he opposed Tokugawa Tsunayoshi's Human Mercy Order and was killed by Tsunayoshi. Another theory is that Yanagisawa Yoshiho, Makino Shigesada and other side servants ordered him to be killed in order to gain power.

Preceded by Mizuno Mototomo	Daimyō of Annaka; 1667–1681	Succeeded by Itakura Shigekata
Preceded by Doi Toshimasu	Daimyō of Koga; 1681–1684	Succeeded by Hotta Masanaka
