= Yodo Domain =

Japanese historical estate in Yamashiro province

Yodo Domain 淀藩
- Domain of Japan
- 1623–1871
- Mon of the Inaba clan
- Capital: Yodo Castle
  - Type: Daimyō
- Historical era: Edo period
  - Established: 1623
  - Disestablished: 1871
- Today part of: Kyoto Prefecture

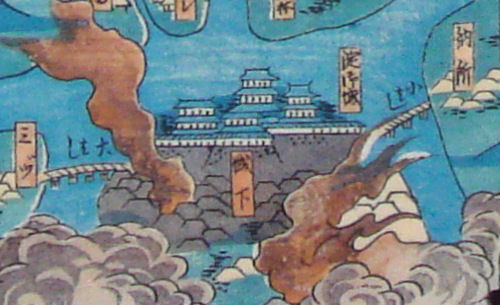
Yodo castle

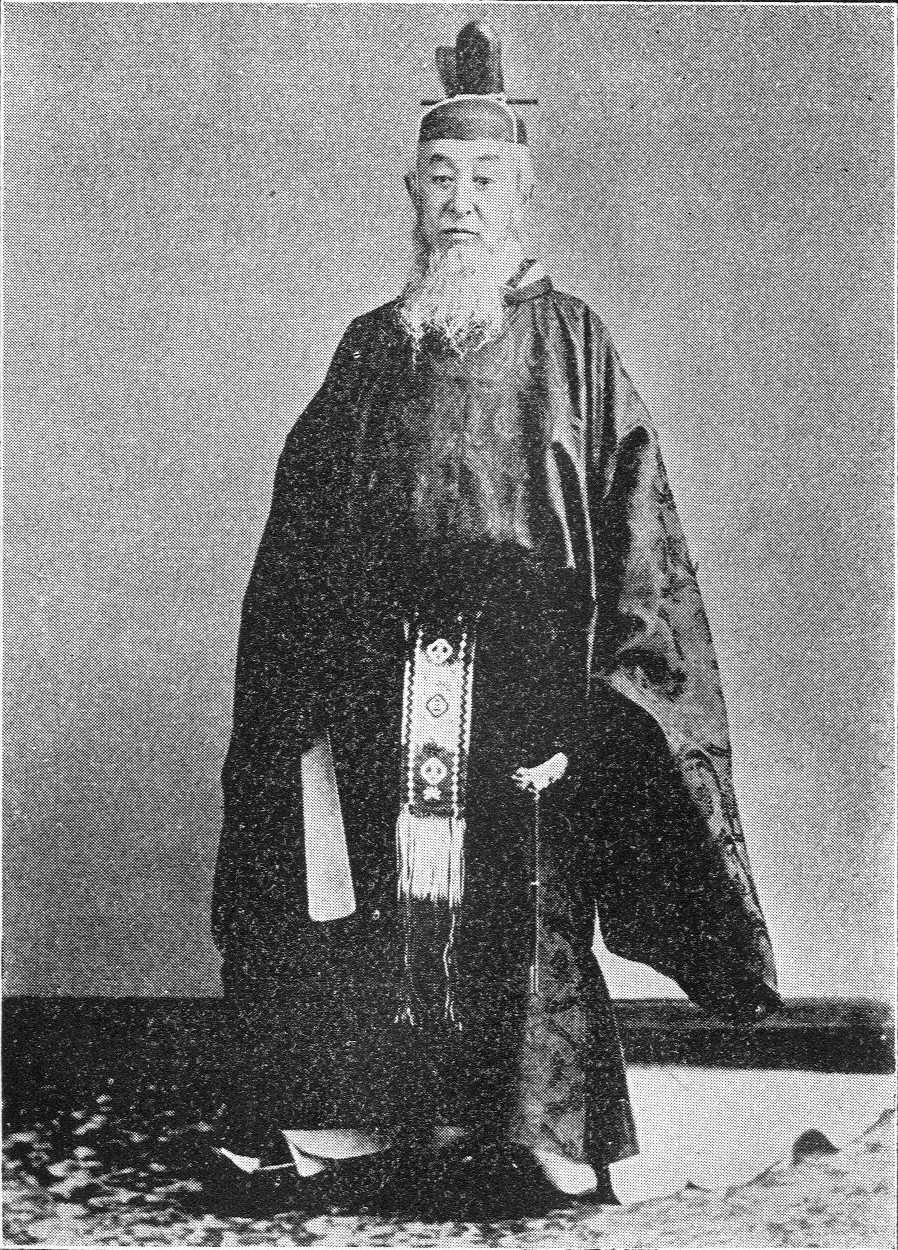
Inaba Masakuni, final daimyo of Yodo Domain

The Yodo Domain (淀藩, Yodo-han) was a Japanese domain of the Edo period, and the only domain located in Yamashiro Province. Its castle was located within modern-day Fushimi, Kyoto.

The strategic location of the castle figured in the 1582 Battle of Yamazaki.

During the 1868 Battle of Toba–Fushimi, the master of Yodo changed his allegiance from the Shogunate to Imperial forces, going as far as closing his gate and refusing protection to the retreating army of the shōgun Tokugawa Yoshinobu.

== History ==
In 1623, Matsudaira Sadatsuna entered the domain with 35,000 koku from the Kakegawa Domain in Totomi, and the Yodo domain was established. This was built to replace the Fushimi domain, which was abolished the previous year, to protect Kyoto. Sadatsuna worked hard to build Yodo Castle (this Yodo Castle is said to have been at a different location than Yodo Old Castle, which is known as the former residence of Yodo-dono, the birth mother of Toyotomi Hideyori). Sadatsuna was transferred to the Mino Ogaki domain in March 1633 (Kanei 10).

In his place, Nagai Naomasa from the Shimousa-Koga domain entered with 100,000 koku. Naomasa solidified the foundations of the domain's government by organizing vassals, developing the castle town, and constructing the Kizugawa River to prevent flooding. Naomasa retired on February 28, 1658 and handed over the headship of his family to his son Nagai Naomasa. At this time, Shosei distributed his territory to his younger brothers, so he inherited a territory of 73,600 koku. For example, his sixth son, Naonobu, had knowledge of 3,000 koku and built the Funabashi Jinya. Shosei was then transferred to the Tango-Miyazu domain on February 25, 1669.

In his place, Ishikawa Noriyuki from the Ise-Kameyama Domain came in with 60,000 koku. Noriyuki retired on February 25, 1706, and his successor, Yoshitaka Ishikawa, died on September 2, 1710. His successor, Ishikawa Sokei, was transferred to the Bitchu-Matsuyama Domain on February 15, 1711.

In his place, Matsudaira Mitsuhiro from the Mino Kano domain came in with 60,000 koku. Mitsuhiro died on September 4, 1717, and his successor, Koji Toda, was transferred to the Shima-Toba domain on November 1, 1717.

In his place, Matsudaira Norimura from the Ise-Kameyama Domain came in with a cost of 60,000 koku.

With Inaba Masatomo entering with 102,000 koku in place, the lord's family finally took set.

After that, the Meiji period took place under the rule of the Inaba family. In 1884, the Inaba family was made a viscount by the kazoku ordinance.

== List of daimyo ==
#	Name	Tenure	Courtesy title	Court Rank	kokudaka
Matsudaira clan, 1623 - 1633 (Shinpan daimyo)
1	Matsudaira Sadatsuna (松平定綱)	1623 - 1633	Etchu no kami (絵t中 の 髪)	Junior 5th Rank, Lower Grade (従五位下)	35,000 koku
Nagai clan, 1633 - 1669 (fudai daimyo)
1	Naomasa (永井直政直政)	1633 - 1658	Shinano no kami (信濃の神)	Junior 5th Rank, Lower Grade (従五位下)	100,000 koku
2	Nagai Naoyuki (永井直之)	1658 - 1669	Lower Ukon Daibu (ローワー・ウコン・ダイブ)	Junior 5th Rank, Lower Grade (従五位下)	736,000 koku
Ishikawa clan, 1669 - 1706 (fudai daimyo)
1	Ichikawa Noriyuki (市川紀行)	1669 - 1706	Shundento (シュンデント)	Junior 5th Rank, Lower Grade (従五位下)	60,000 koku
2	Ichikawa Yoshitaka (市川義隆)	1706 - 1710	Echizen no kami (越前の神)	Junior 5th Rank, Lower Grade (従五位下)	60,000 koku
3	Ichikawa Fusayoshi (市川房吉)	1710 - 1711	None (全然)	Junior 5th Rank, Lower Grade (従五位下)	60,000 koku
Matsudaira clan, 1711 - 1717 (fudai daimyo)
1	Matsudaira Mitsuhiro (松平光弘)	1711 - 1717	Etchu no kami (絵t中 の 髪)	Junior 5th Rank, Lower Grade (従五位下)	60,000 koku
2	Matsudaira Mitsuchika (松平ミツチカ)	1717	Tanba no kami (私たちのノータンバ)	Junior 5th Rank, Lower Grade (従五位下)	60,000 koku
Matsudaira clan, 1717 - 1723 (fudai daimyo)
1	Matsudaira Norisato (松平ノリサト)	1717 - 1723	Tanba no kami (私たちのノータンバ)	Junior 5th Rank, Lower Grade (従五位下)	60,000 koku
Inaba clan, 1723 - 1871 (fudai daimyo)
1	Inaba Masatomo (稲葉正友)	1723 - 1729	Nagato no kami (長門の神)	Junior 5th Rank, Lower Grade (従五位下)	102,000 koku
2	Inaba Masato (稲葉マサト)	1729 - 1730	Mino no kami (ミノノー私たち)	Junior 5th Rank, Lower Grade (従五位下)	102,000 koku
3	Inaba Masatsune (稲葉政経)	1730	None (全然)	Junior 5th Rank, Lower Grade (従五位下)	102,000 koku
4	Inaba Masachika (稲葉正智カ)	1730 - 1734	Sado no kami (佐渡神)	Junior 5th Rank, Lower Grade (従五位下)	102,000 koku
5	Inaba Masayoshi (稲葉正義)	1734 - 1771	Takumi no kami (タクミの私たち)	Junior 5th Rank, Lower Grade (従五位下)	102,000 koku
6	Inaba Masahiro (稲葉雅弘)	1771 - 1773	Mino no kami (ミノノー私たち)	Junior 5th Rank, Lower Grade (従五位下)	102,000 koku
7	Masanobu (稲葉正信)	1773 - 1806	Tango no kami (タンゴいいえ私たち)	Junior 4th Rank, Lower Grade (従五位下)	102,000 koku
8	Inaba Masanari (稲葉マサナリ)	1806 - 1815	'Nagato no kami (長門の神)	Junior 5th Rank, Lower Grade (従五位下)	102,000 koku
9	Inaba Masaharu (稲葉雅治)	1815 - 1823	Tsushima no kami (対馬の神)	Junior 5th Rank, Lower Grade (従五位下)	102,000 koku
10	Inaba Masamori (稲葉正盛)	1823 - 1842	Sado no kami (佐渡神)	Junior 5th Rank, Lower Grade (従五位下)	102,000 koku
11	Inaba Masayoshi (稲葉正義)	1842 - 1848	Tango no kami (絵t中 の 髪)	Junior 5th Rank, Lower Grade (タンゴいいえ私たち)	102,000 koku
12	Masakuni (稲葉正国)	1848 - 1871	Mino no kami (ミノノー私たち)	Junior 5th Rank, Lower Grade (従五位下)	102,000 koku

== See also ==
- Abolition of the han system
- List of Han
