= Itoigawa Domain =

Kiyosaki Domain (1869–1871) 清崎藩 Itoigawa Domain (1692–1869) 糸魚川藩
- Domain of Japan
- 1692–1871
- Capital: Itoigawa jin'ya
- Area
  - Coordinates: 37°2′38.81″N 137°51′13.25″E
- Government
  - Type: Daimyō
- Historical era: Edo period
  - Established: 1692
  - Disestablished: 1871
Preceded by	Succeeded by
Echigo Province	Kiyosaki Prefecture
- Today part of: Niigata Prefecture

Itoigawa Domain (糸魚川藩, Itoigawa-han) was a feudal domain under the Tokugawa shogunate of Edo period Japan. It is located in Echigo Province, Honshū. The domain was centered at Itoigawa Jin'ya, located in what is now part of the city of Itoigawa in Niigata Prefecture.

== History ==
Itoigawa was initially an outlying portion of Takada Domain under the control of the Matsudaira clan following the establishment of the Tokugawa shogunate. It was separated from Takeda Domain following an O-Ie Sōdō.

In 1692, Arima Kiyozumi was transferred (i.e. demoted) from Nobeoka Domain to Itoigawa due to mismanagement of his domains which resulted in a peasant revolt. This marked the start of Itoigawa Domain. He has transferred in 1695 to Maruoka Domain and the territory reverted to tenryō status.

Itoigawa Domain was created again in 1699, this time as a 10,000 koku holding for Honda Tsukeyoshi, who had been elevated from hatamoto status. He was transferred to Iiyama Domain in 1717.

The domain was then given to Matsudaira Naoyuki, grandson of Matsudaira Mitsumichi through his son Matsukata Naokata of the Echizen-Matsudaira line. His descendants ruled until the Meiji restoration. Despite the domain's location on the "Shio-no-michi", or main highway connecting the Hokuriku region with Edo and Kyoto, the domain was very small in kokudaka and suffered from numerous natural disasters, which meant that its finances were always in a crisis situation. A major uprising occurred in 1814. The sudden inflation of prices following the Perry Expedition and orders from the Tokugawa shogunate to construct coastal defence fortifications also created great unrest. The 7th daimyō of Itoigawa, Matsudaira Mochiaki became the 17th (and final) daimyō of Fukui Domain. The domain quickly sided with the Imperial forces in the Boshin War and was renamed Kiyosaki Domain (清崎藩, Kiyosaki han) by the Meiji government.

In July 1871, with the abolition of the han system, Itoigawa Domain briefly became Itoigawa Prefecture, and was merged into the newly created Niigata Prefecture. Under the new Meiji government, the final daimyō, Matsudaira Naoyasu was given the kazoku peerage title of shishaku (viscount).

== Bakumatsu period holdings ==
As with most domains in the han system, Itoigawa Domain consisted of several discontinuous territories calculated to provide the assigned kokudaka, based on periodic cadastral surveys and projected agricultural yields.

- Echigo Province
  - 54 villages in Kubiki District
  - 43 villages in Uonuma District

== List of daimyō ==
#	Name	Tenure	Courtesy title	Court Rank	kokudaka	Notes
Arima clan (tozama) 1692-1695
1	Arima Kiyozumi (有馬清純)	1692-1695	Suo-no-kami (周防守)	Junior 5th Rank, Lower Grade (従五位下)	50,000 koku	Transfer from Nobeoka; Transfer to Maruoka
tenryō 1695-1698
Honda clan (fudai) 1699-1717
1	Honda Sukeyoshi (本多助芳)	1699-1717	Wakasa-no-kami (若狭守)	Junior 5th Rank, Lower Grade (従五位下)	10,000 koku	Transfer to Iiyama
Matsudaira clan (shinpan) 1717-1868
1	Matsudaira Naoyuki (松平直之)	1717-1718	Omi-no-kami (近江守)	Junior 5th Rank, Lower Grade (従五位下)	10,000 koku	
2	Matsudaira Naoyoshi (松平直好)	1718-1739	Kawachi-no-kami (河内守)	Junior 5th Rank, Lower Grade (従五位下)	10,000 koku	
3	Matsudaira Katafusa (松平堅房)	1739-1773	Hyūga-no-kami (日向守)	Junior 5th Rank, Lower Grade (従五位下)	10,000 koku	
4	Matsudaira Naotsugu (松平直紹)	1773-1806	Hyūga-no-kami (日向守)	Junior 5th Rank, Lower Grade (従五位下)	10,000 koku	
5	Matsudaira Naomasu (松平直益)	1806-1826	Hyūga-no-kami (日向守)	Junior 5th Rank, Lower Grade (従五位下)	10,000 koku	
6	Matsudaira Naoharu (松平直春)	1826-1857	Hyūga-no-kami (日向守)	Junior 5th Rank, Lower Grade (従五位下)	10,000 koku	
7	Matsudaira Mochiaki (松平茂昭)	1857-1858	Hyūga-no-kami (日向守)	Junior 5th Rank, Lower Grade (従五位下)	10,000 koku	
8	Matsudaira Naoyasu (松平直静)	1858-1871	Hyūga-no-kami (日向守)	Junior 5th Rank, Lower Grade (従五位下)	10,000 koku	

=== Matsudaira Naoyuki ===
Matsudaira Naoyuki (松平直之; June 2, 1682 – October 29, 1718) was the 1st Matsudaira daimyō of Itoigawa Domain in Echigo Province under the Edo period Tokugawa shogunate. Naoyuki born as the third son of Matsudaira Chikatoki of Hirose Domain in Izumo Province, and was adopted as heir to Matsudaira Naotomo of the Echizen-Matsudaira clan. His wife was Kame-hime, the daughter Matsudaira Naokata, the son of Matsudaira Mitsumichi. In 1705, he was received in formal audience by Shōgun Tokugawa Tsunayoshi and granted the courtesy title of Shinano-no-kami, which was changed a year later to Omi-no-kami. In 1717, he amassed the necessary kokudaka to qualify for the rank of daimyō and was appointed to the vacant seat of Itoigawa. However, he died the following year at the age of 36 without ever having visited his domain.

=== Matsudaira Naoyoshi ===
Matsudaira Naoyoshi (松平直好; October 26, 1701 – March 25, 1739) was the 2nd Matsudaira daimyō of Itoigawa. Naoyuki born to a hatamoto line of retainers, and was adopted as posthumous heir on the unexpectedly sudden death of Matsudaira Naoyuki. His wife was a daughter of Honda Tsukeyoshi, a former daimyō of Itoigawa who was now daimyō of Iiyama Domain. In 1726, he was appointed to the post of Osaka Kaban, and in 1727 to the post of bugyō overseeing the festivals at the Nikkō Tōshō-gū. These duties, together with a fire which destroyed to domain's main Edo residence in 1731 all but bankrupted the domain. He died in 1739 at the age of 39.

=== Matsudaira Katafusa ===
Matsudaira Katafusa (松平堅房; October 22, 1734 – March 8, 1773) was the 3rd Matsudaira daimyō of Itoigawa. Katafusa was the fourth son of Naoyoshi, and became daimyō at the age of eight upon his father's sudden death. Domain affairs were handled by Matsudaira Naokata, who also oversaw his genpuku ceremony. In 1750, he was received in formal audience by Shōgun Tokugawa Ieshige. He subsequently served in numerous minor posts within the administration of the shogunate. his wife was a daughter of Wakabe Mizunabe of Ōmizo Domain. He died in 1773 at the age of 39.

=== Matsudaira Naotsugu ===
Matsudaira Naotsugu (松平直紹; December 30, 1759 – October 9, 1814) was the 4th Matsudaira daimyō of Itoigawa. Naotsugu was the seventh son of Katafusa, and became daimyō upon his father's sudden death in 1773. In 1776, he was received in formal audience by Shōgun Tokugawa Ieharu. He subsequently served in numerous minor posts within the administration of the shogunate, however, with each posting the financial drain on the domain became increasingly severe. He retired from public life in 1806 and died in 1814. His wife was a daughter of Honda Sukemitsu of Iiyama Domain.

=== Matsudaira Naomasu ===
Matsudaira Naomasu (松平直益; August 22, 1789 – July 16, 1833) was the 5th Matsudaira daimyō of Itoigawa. Naomasu was the eldest son of Naotsugu, and became daimyō upon his father's retirement in 1806. He subsequently served in numerous minor posts within the administration of the shogunate, however, with each posting the financial drain on the domain became increasingly severe. The financial problems of the domain were further compounded by a fire which destroyed the domain's main Edo residence in 1810, and another massive fire which destroyed the jōkamachi of Itoigawa in 1811. He was forced to borrow money at usurious rates from merchant houses, and to raise taxes to unsustainable levels, which resulted in a widespread revolt within the domain. He retired from public office in 1826 and died in 1833. His wife was the daughter of Matsudaira Naohiro of Akashi Domain; he later remarried to a daughter of Honda Masaharu of Tanaka Domain.

=== Matsudaira Naoharu ===
Matsudaira Naoharu (松平直春; October 17, 1810 – June 22, 1878) was the 6th Matsudaira daimyō of Itoigawa. Naoharu was the second son of Naomasu, and became daimyō upon his father's retirement in 1826. He subsequently served in numerous minor posts within the administration of the shogunate, including bugyō overseeing the festivals at the Nikkō Tōshō-gū in 1833. In 1857, he retired in favour of his fourth son Matsudaira Naokiyo; however, Naokiyo was transferred to Fukui Domain the following year by the shogunate, and Matsudaira Naoyasu was sent from Akashi Domain to take his place. As he was still underage, Naoharu ruled the domain from behind-the-scenes until the Meiji restoration. In 1872, he relocated to Tokyo, where he died in 1878. His wife was a daughter of Satake Yoshichika of Iwasaki Domain.

=== Matsudaira Mochiaki ===
Matsudaira Mochiaki (松平茂昭; September 17, 1826 – July 25, 1890) was the 7th Matsudaira daimyō of Itoigawa Domain and later the 17th (and final) daimyō of Fukui Domain in Echizen Province. He ruled Itoigawa as Matsudaira Naokiyo (直廉), but was transferred to Fukui Domain when Matsudaira Yoshinaga (better known as Matsudaira Shungaku was forced into retirement during the Ansei Purge.

=== Matsudaira Naoyasu ===
Matsudaira Naoyasu (松平直静; February 23, 1848 – December 13, 1913) was the 8th (and final) Matsudaira daimyō of Itoigawa. Naoyasu was the seventh son of Matsudaira Naritsugu of Akashi Domain, and was selected to replace Matsudaira Mochiaki as daimyō after the latter was transferred to Fukui Domain. However, due to his youth, all power remained in the hands of his father-in-law, Matsudaira Naoharu, who ruled for behind-the-scenes. In 1868, the new Meiji government renamed Itoigawa Domain "Kiyosaki Domain" and from 1869 to the abolition of the han system in 1871 he served as Imperial governor. In 1872, he relocated to Tokyo, where he died in 1913. He received the title of shishaku (viscount) in the kazoku peerage system.

== See also ==
List of Han
