= Mino Province =

Former province of Japan

Mino Province 美濃国
- pre-Meiji period Japan
- 701–1871
- Map of Japanese provinces (1868) with Mino Province highlighted
- Capital: Tarui
- Area
  - Coordinates: 35°22′39″N 136°31′26″E
- History
  - Ritsuryō system: 701
  - Disestablished: 1871
- Today part of: Gifu Prefecture

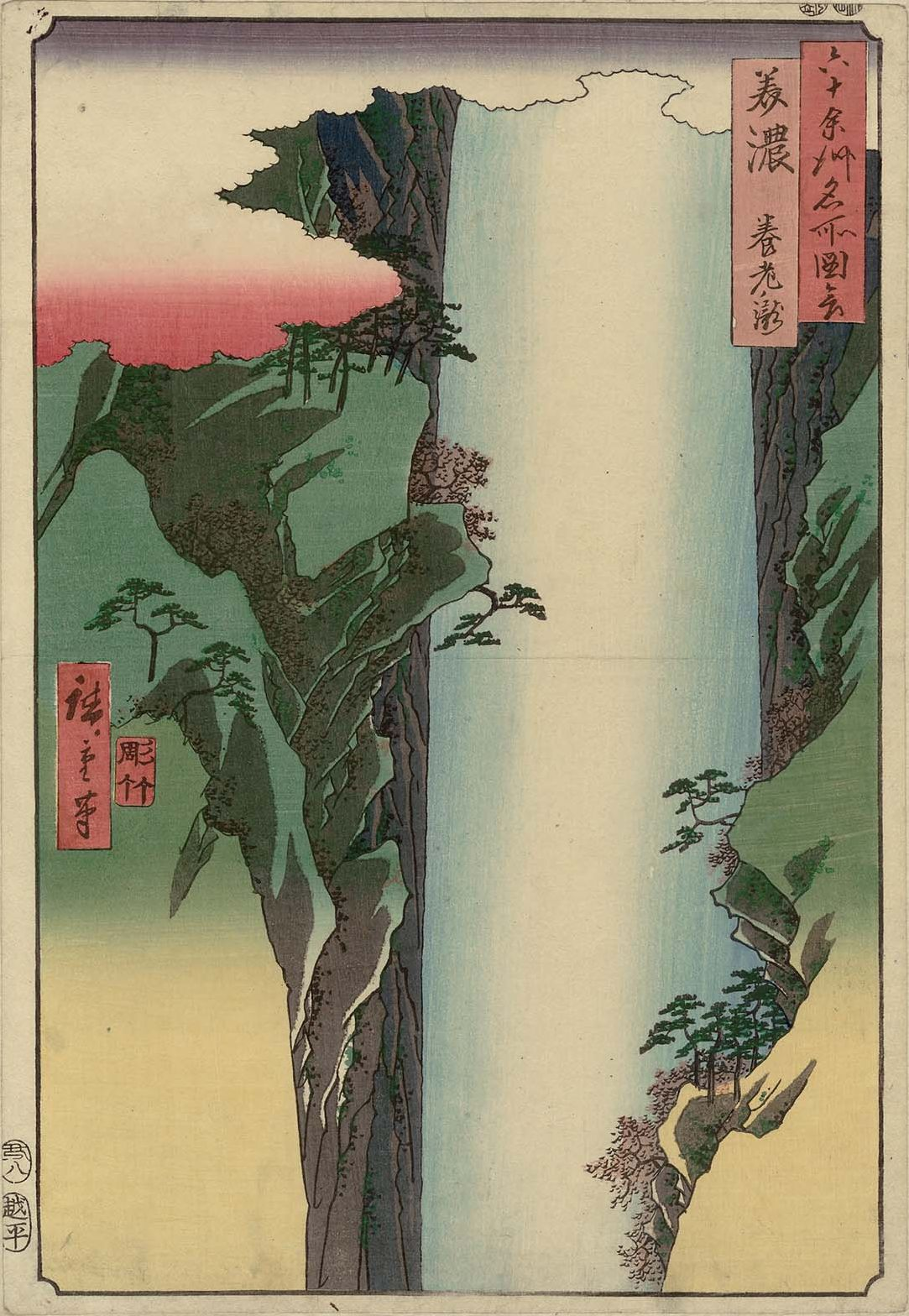
Hiroshige ukiyo-e "Hida" in "The Famous Scenes of the Sixty States" (六十余州名所図会), depicting a Yōrō Falls

Mino Province (美濃国, Mino no Kuni; Japanese pronunciation: [mʲí.nò̞ (nò̞ kɯ̈̀.ɲ̟ì), mʲì.nó̞ (nò̞ kɯ̈̀.ɲ̟ì)]) was a province of Japan in the area of Japan that is today southern Gifu Prefecture. Mino was bordered by Ōmi to the west, Echizen and Hida to the north, Shinano to the east, and Ise, Mikawa, and Owari to the south. Its abbreviated form name was Nōshū or Jōshū (濃州). Under the Engishiki classification system, Mino was ranked as one of the 13 "great countries" (大国) in terms of importance, and one of the "near countries" (近国) in terms of distance from the capital. The provincial capital and ichinomiya were located in what is now the town of Tarui.

== Historical record ==
"Mino" is an ancient place name, and appears in mokkan wooden tags from the ruins of Asuka-kyō, Fujiwara-kyō, and other ancient sites, but using the kanji "三野国". Per the Kujiki, there were originally three separate countries in Mino, centered around what is now Ōgaki, Ōno, and Kakamigahara. Each had its own Kuni no miyatsuko, and together with Motosu (in eastern Gifu) and Mugetsu (in north-central Gifu), these five entities were joined under Yamato rule to form the province of Mino. The use of the kanji "美濃" is found in the Kojiki and became prevalent in the Nara period. Early Mino included much of Kiso District in Shinano and portions of northern Owari. The route of the ancient Tōsandō highway connecting the ancient capitals of Japan and the eastern provinces passed through Mino, and even in 713 AD, records indicate that the road was widened to accommodate increasing numbers of travelers.

The Nihon Shoki and Shoku Nihongi indicates that numerous immigrants from the Hata clan and from Silla settled in Mino in the Asuka and Nara periods.

During the Kamakura and Muromachi Period, the Toki clan held the position of shugo of Mino Province. During the Sengoku period, Saitō Dōsan usurped political power from the Toki, and later the province was conquered by Oda Nobunaga. The Battle of Sekigahara took place at the western edge of Mino, near the mountains between the Chūbu Region and the Kinki Region. With the establishment of the Tokugawa Shogunate, several feudal domains were established in Mino. At the time of the Meiji restoration, Mino was divided into 18 districts, which in turn were divided into 131 subdistricts and 1561 villages. The total assessed kokudaka of the province was 654,872 koku.

== Historical districts ==
Mino Province consisted of twenty-one districts:

- Gifu Prefecture
  - Anpachi District (安八郡) – absorbed parts of Taki District; but lost parts to Kaisai and Shimoishizu Districts to become Kaizu District (海津郡) on April 1, 1896
  - Atsumi District (厚見郡) – merged with Kakami and parts of Katagata Districts to become Inaba District (稲葉郡) on April 1, 1896
  - Ena District (恵那郡) – dissolved
  - Fuwa District (不破郡)
  - Gujō District (郡上郡) – dissolved
  - Haguri District (羽栗郡) – merged with Nakashima District to become Hashima District (羽島郡) on April 1, 1896
  - Ikeda District (池田郡) – merged with parts of Ōno (Mino) Districts to become Ibi District (揖斐郡) on April 1, 1896
  - Ishizu District (石津郡)
    - Kamiishizu District (上石津郡) – merged with parts of Taki District to become Yōrō District (養老郡) on April 1, 1896
    - Shimoishizu District (下石津郡) – merged with Kaisai and parts of Anpachi Districts to become Kaizu District on April 1, 1896
  - Kaisai District (海西郡) – merged with Shimoishizu and parts of Anpachi Districts to become Kaizu District on April 1, 1896
  - Kakami District (各務郡) – merged with Atsumi and parts of Katagata Districts to become Inaba District on April 1, 1896
  - Kamo District (加茂郡)
  - Kani District (可児郡)
  - Katagata District (石津郡) – dissolved to split and merged into parts of Inaba, Motosu and Yamagata Districts on April 1, 1896
  - Mugi District (武儀郡) – dissolved
  - Mushiroda District (席田郡) – merged with former Motosu, parts of Katagata and parts of Ōno (Mino) Districts to become Motosu District (本巣郡) on April 1, 1896
  - Nakashima District (中島郡) – merged with Haguri District to become Hashima District on April 1, 1896
  - Ōno District (Mino) (大野郡) – dissolved to split and merged into parts of Motosu and Ibi Districts on April 1, 1896
  - Taki District (石津郡) – dissolved to split and merged into parts of Yōrō and Anpachi Districts on April 1, 1896
  - Toki District (土岐郡) – dissolved
  - Yamagata District (山県郡) – absorbed parts of Katagata District on April 1, 1896; now dissolved

== Shugo ==
Below is an incomplete list of the shugo who controlled Mino Province and the years of their control:

=== Kamakura shogunate ===
- Ōuchi Koreyoshi (大内惟義), 1187–1211
- Ōuchi Korenobu (大内惟信), until 1221
- Utunomiya Yasutsuna (宇都宮泰綱), from 1252
- Hōjō clan, from 1285
- Hōjō Tokimura (北条時村), 1296–1300
- Hōjō Masataka (北条政高), until 1333

=== Muromachi shogunate ===
- Toki Yorisada (土岐頼貞), 1336–1339
- Toki Yoritō (土岐頼遠), 1339–1342
- Toki Yoriyasu (土岐頼康), 1342–1387
- Toki Yasuyuki (土岐康行), 1387–1389
- Toki Yoritada (土岐頼忠), 1390–1394
- Toki Yorimasu (土岐頼益), 1395–1414
- Toki Mochimasu (土岐持益), 1422–1465
- Toki Shigeyori (土岐成頼), 1468–1495
- Toki Masafusa (土岐政房), 1495–1519
- Toki Yorinari (土岐頼芸), 1519–1542

=== Edo period Domains ===
Domains in Mino Province
Name	HQ	Daimyō & kokudaka
Ōgaki Domain	Ōgaki Castle	Ishikawa clan: 50,000; 1601–1616 (transfer to Hita Domain); Hisamatsu-Matsudaira clan: 20,000; 1616–1624 (transfer to Komoro Domain); Okabe clan: 50,000; 1624–1633 (transfer to Tatsuno Domain]); Matsudaira clan: 60,000; 1633–1635 (transfer to Kuwana Domain); Toda clan: 100,000,1635–1871
Ōgaki Shinden Domain	Hatamura jin'ya	Toda clan: 10,000; 1688–1871
Gujō Domain	Gujō Hachiman Castle	Endo clan: 27,000→24,000; 1600–1692 (attainder); Inoue clan: 50,000; 1692–1697 (transfer to Kameyama Domain); Kanemori clan: 38,000; 1697–1758 (attainder due to mismanagement); Aoyama clan: 48,000; 1758–1871
Kanō Domain	Kanō Castle	Okudaira clan: 100,000; 1601–1632 (attainder); Ōkubo clan: 50,000; 1632–1639 (transfer to Akashi Domain); Toda-Matsudaira clan: 70,000; 1639–1711 (transfer to Yodo Domain); Andō clan: 65,000→50,000; 1711–1756 (transfer to Iwakitaira Domain); Nagai clan: 32,000; 1711–1871
Iwamura Domain	Iwamura Castle	Ogyū-Matsudaira clan: 20,000; 1601–1638 (transfer from Hamamatsu Domain); Niwa clan: 20,000; 1638–1702 (transfer to Takayanagi Domain); Ogyū-Matsudaira clan: 20,000→30,000; 1702–1871
Naegi Domain	Naegi Castle	Tōyama clan: 10,000; 1600–1871
Takatomi Domain	Takatomi jin'ya	Honjo clan: 10,000; 1709–1871
Imao Domain	Imao Castle; Imao jin'ya	Ichihashi clan: 20,000; 1600–1610 (transfer to Yabase Domain; Takenokoshi clan: 10,000→20,000→30,000→20,000; 1611–1871 (as part of Owari Domain)
Takasu Domain	Takasu Castle; Takasu jin'ya	Tokunaga clan: 50,000; 1600–1628 (attainder); Ogasawara clan: 22,000; 1640–1691 (transfer to Katsuyama Domain); Owari Tokugawa clan: 30,000; 1700–1870 (as part of Owari Domain)
Kurono Domain	Kurono Castle	Kato calan: 40,000; 1600–1610 (transfer to Yonago Domain)
Ibi Domain	Ibi Castle	Nishio clan: 30,000→25,500; 1600–1623 (attainder)
Kaneyama Domain		Matsudaira clan: 25,000; 1600–1601 (transfer to Hamamatsu Domain)
Kozuchi Domain	Ogurayama Castle	Kanemori clan: 18,000→20,000; 1600–1611 (attainder)
Jushichijo Domain	Jushichijo Castle	Inaba clan: 10,000→20,000, 1607–1627 (transfer to Moka Domain)
Aono Domain	Aono jin'ya	Inaba clan: 12,000; 1681–1684 (attainder)
Seki Domain	Seki jin'ya	Oshima clan: 18,000 1600–1604 (reduced to hatamoto holding)
Kiyomizu Domain	Kiyomisu Castle	Inaba clan: 12,000; 1600–1607 (attainder)
Iwataki Domain	Iwataki Jin'ya	Honjo clan: 1,000: 1705–1709 (reelected to Takatomi Domai )
Tokuno Domain	Tokuno jin'ya	Hiraoka clan: 10,000; 1604–1653 (attainder)
Nomura Domain		Oda clan: 10,000; 1600–1631 (attainder)
Mino-Hasegawa Domain		Hasegawa clan: 10,000 1617–1635 (divided into hatamoto holdings)
Mino-Wakisaka Domain		Wakisaka clan: 10,000; 1615–1632 (attainder)

== Geography ==
Mino and Owari provinces were separated by the Sakai River, which means "border river."

== Other websites ==
Media related to Mino Province at Wikimedia Commons

- Murdoch's map of provinces, 1903
