= Takeda Shingen (TV series) =

- Written by: Seiken Tamukai
- Directed by: Akihiko Shigemitsu and others
- Starring: Kiichi Nakai; Kyōhei Shibata; Misako Konno; Mao Daichi; Yoko Minamino; Shinichi Tsutsumi; Ryo Ishibashi; Hiroaki Murakami; Isao Hashizume; Yumi Asō; Kimiko Ikegami; Ryōsuke Miki; Kōjirō Hongō; Nakamura Hashinosuke; Jun Hamamura; Saburō Shinoda; Kyōko Kishida; Nakamura Kankurō V Kiyoshi Kodama; Joe Shishido; Ken Utsui; Kei Satō; Bunta Sugawara; Mikijirō Hira; Mayumi Ogawa; Toshiyuki Nishida; Ryōtarō Sugi
- Narrated by: Ayako Wakao
- Opening theme: NHK Symphony Orchestra
- Composer: Naozumi Yamamoto
- Country of origin: Japan
- Original language: Japanese
- No. of episodes: 50

Production
- Executive producer: Kei Murakami
- Running time: 45 minutes

Original release
- Network: NHK
- Release: January 10 – December 18, 1988

Takeda Shingen (武田信玄) is a 1988 Japanese historical television series. It is the 26th NHK Taiga drama. It is based on the novels by Jirō Nitta of the same title. It had the average viewing rating of 39.7%, with its peak reaching 47.8%. It had the second highest average viewership rating in its history with only a 0.5% difference to the previous year's Taiga drama One-Eyed Dragon Masamune.

== Plot ==
The series focuses on the life of Takeda Shingen during the Sengoku period. The narrator is Takeda Shingen's mother, Ōi-no-kata, who tells the story to the audience. Even when she dies mid-way through the main story, it is her spirit who continues to narrate the events and watch over her son until the very end. It covers from when Shingen exiled his father to his funeral three years after his death.

== Production ==
- Sword fight arranger - Kunishirō Hayashi

== Cast ==
=== Takeda clan ===
- Kiichi Nakai as Takeda Shingen
  - Claude Maki as young Shingen and Takeda Katsuyori
- Mikijirō Hira as Takeda Nobutora, Shingen's father
- Ayako Wakao as Lady Ōi, Shingen's mother (series narrator)
- Misako Konno as Lady Sanjō, Shingen's wife
- Mayumi Ogawa as Yae
- Yoko Minamino as Okoko and Koihime
- Mao Daichi as Satomi
- Kimiko Ikegami as Eri
- Takeshi Wakamatsu as Takeda Nobushige
- Masaru Shinozuka as Takeda Nobukado
- Shinichi Tsutsumi as Takeda Yoshinobu
  - Nakamura Shichinosuke II as young Yoshinobu
- Katsuya Kobayashi as Hara Masatoshi
- Kei Satō as Abe Katsuyoshi
- Taketoshi Naito as Gishū

"Twenty-Four Generals of Takeda Shingen"

- Joe Shishido as Hara Toratane
- Kiyoshi Kodama as Obu Toramasa
- Ryōsuke Miki as Baba Nobuharu
- Kōjirō Hongō as Amari Torayasu
- Bunta Sugawara as Itagaki Nobukata
- Hiroaki Murakami as Kōsaka "Danjō" Masanobu
- Isao Hashizume as Sanada Yukitaka
- Saburō Shinoda as Yamagata Masakage
- Toshiyuki Nishida as Yamamoto Kansuke

=== Uesugi clan ===
- Kyōhei Shibata as Uesugi Kenshin, Shingen's rival
- Ken Utsui as Naoe Kagetsuna
- Yūsuke Takita as Uesugi Norimasa
- Tokuma Nishioka as Kitajō Takahiro
- Hiroshi Katsuno as Ōkuma Tomohide

=== Imagawa clan ===
- Nakamura Kankurō V as Imagawa Yoshimoto
- Kyōko Kishida as Jukeini
- Ichirō Zaitsu as Taigen Sessai

=== Later Hōjō clan ===
- Ryōtarō Sugi as Hōjō Ujiyasu
- Yūichi Aoyama as Hōjō Ujimasa
- Mai Okamoto as Oume
- Takao Inoue as Matsuda Norihide

=== Oda clan ===
- Ryo Ishibashi as Oda Nobunaga
- Yumi Asō as Nōhime
- Tsuyoshi Ihara as Oda Nobuyuki

=== Tokugawa clan ===
- Nakamura Hashinosuke III as Tokugawa Ieyasu
- Shinshō Nakamaru as Sakai Tadatsugu

=== Suwa clan ===
- Bandō Yasosuke V as Suwa Yorishige
- Yorie Yamashita as Nene Goryōnin

=== Murakami clan ===
- Tsunehiko Kamijō as Murakami Yoshikiyo

=== Others ===
- Ichikawa Danzō IX as Ashikaga Yoshiaki, the last shogun of the Ashikaga shogunate

== TV schedule ==
| Episode | Original airdate | Title | Directed by | Rating |
|---|---|---|---|---|
| 1 | January 10, 1988 | "Chichi to Ko" (父と子) | Akihiko Shigemitsu | 42.5% |
| 2 | January 17, 1988 | "Ketsui no Toki" (決意の時) | Minoru Fuse | 47.3% |
| 3 | January 24, 1988 | "Wakare" (別れ) | Seiji Ōmori | 48.6% |
| 4 | January 31, 1988 | "Unmei no Deai" (運命の出会い) | Akihiko Shigemitsu | 48.1% |
| 5 | February 7, 1988 | "Kosui Densetsu" (湖水伝説) | Minoru Fuse | 45.0% |
| 6 | February 14, 1988 | "Suwa-zeme" (諏訪攻め) | Seiji Ōmori | 49.2% |
| 7 | February 21, 1988 | "Fūrin Kazan" (風林火山) | Akihiko Shigemitsu | 46.6% |
| 8 | February 28, 1988 | "Koi-hime" (湖衣姫) | Minoru Fuse | 48.6% |
| 9 | March 6, 1988 | "Onna no Ikusa" (女のいくさ) | Seiji Ōmori | 46.5% |
| 10 | March 13, 1988 | "Kuni-zukuri" (国造り) | Shigeki Akiyama | 46.9% |
| 11 | March 20, 1988 | "Echigo no Tora" (越後の虎) | Akihiko Shigemitsu | 43.9% |
| 12 | March 27, 1988 | "Umi no Hōjō" (海の北条) | Minoru Fuse | 45.6% |
| 13 | April 3, 1988 | "Kawanakajima eno Michi" (川中島への道) | Seiji Ōmori | 36.5% |
| 14 | April 10, 1988 | "Owari no Itanji" (尾張の異端児) | Akihiko Shigemitsu | 44.0% |
| 15 | April 17, 1988 | "Haha to Ko" (母と子) | Minoru Fuse | 43.4% |
| 16 | April 24, 1988 | "Shinano Seifuku" (信濃征服) | Seiji Ōmori | 40.2% |
| 17 | May 1, 1988 | "Tora tono Deai" (虎との出会い) | Akihiko Shigemitsu | 39.3% |
| 18 | May 8, 1988 | "Saraba Koi-hime" (さらば湖衣姫) | Hisashi Ichii | 39.1% |
| 19 | May 15, 1988 | "Sangoku Dōmei" (三国同盟) | Minoru Fuse | 42.8% |
| 20 | May 22, 1988 | "Nihyaku-nichi no Taijin" (二百日の対陣) | Seiji Ōmori | 37.4% |
| 21 | May 29, 1988 | "Kagetora Shissō" (景虎失跡) | Akihiko Shigemitsu | 36.8% |
| 22 | June 5, 1988 | "Kanpū Hatsumei" (奸風発迷) | Shigeki Akiyama | 35.5% |
| 23 | June 12, 1988 | "Nobutora Henshin" (信虎変身) | Minoru Fuse | 34.1% |
| 24 | June 19, 1988 | "Yoshimoto Uchijini" (義元討死) | Akihiko Shigemitsu | 35.3% |
| 25 | June 26, 1988 | "Higeki no Hottan" (悲劇の発端) | Hisashi Ichii | 37.1% |
| 26 | July 3, 1988 | "Ujiyasu to Kagetora" (氏康と景虎) | Seiji Ōmori | 33.7% |
| 27 | July 10, 1988 | "Kawanakajima Kessen (1)" (川中島血戦（一）) | Akihiko Shigemitsu | 36.4% |
| 28 | July 17, 1988 | "Kawanakajima Kessen (2)" (川中島血戦（二）) | Akihiko Shigemitsu | 37.7% |
| 29 | July 24, 1988 | "Shōri to Haiboku" (勝利と敗北) | Minoru Fuse | 34.7% |
| 30 | July 31, 1988 | "Yoshinobu Jiken (1)" (義信事件（一）) | Seiji Ōmori | 31.5% |
| 31 | August 7, 1988 | "Yoshinobu Jiken (2)" (義信事件（二）) | Minoru Fuse | 33.7% |
| 32 | August 14, 1988 | "Waga-ko Yūhei" (わが子幽閉) | Akihiko Shigemitsu | 31.8% |
| 33 | August 21, 1988 | "Oni-mino no Shi" (鬼美濃の死) | Shigeki Akiyama | 36.3% |
| 34 | August 28, 1988 | "Jōshū-zeme" (上州攻め) | Seiji Ōmori | 35.0% |
| 35 | September 4, 1988 | "Meiyaku Hōkai" (盟約崩壊) | Akihiko Shigemitsu | 38.0% |
| 36 | September 11, 1988 | "Nobunaga Jōraku" (信長上洛) | Minoru Fuse | 37.4% |
| 37 | September 18, 1988 | "Suruga-zeme" (駿河攻め) | Kōji Yoshikawa | 34.1% |
| 38 | September 25, 1988 | "Odawara-zeme" (小田原攻め) | Seiji Ōmori | 39.3% |
| 39 | October 2, 1988 | "Kyō no Yume" (京の夢) | Akihiko Shigemitsu | 36.8% |
| 40 | October 9, 1988 | "Kurayami no Oni" (暗闇の鬼) | Hisashi Ichii | 29.5% |
| 41 | October 16, 1988 | "Tsukiyo no Kagami" (月夜の鏡) | Seiji Ōmori | 36.4% |
| 42 | October 23, 1988 | "Nijū no Shi" (二重の死) | Akihiko Shigemitsu | 41.9% |
| 43 | October 30, 1988 | "Hassen-nen no Haru" (八千年の春) | Fumitaka Tamura | 37.7% |
| 44 | November 6, 1988 | "Ujiyasu no Banka" (氏康の挽歌) | Seiji Ōmori | 34.5% |
| 45 | November 13, 1988 | "Kyō eno Michi" (京への道) | Hisashi Ichii | 36.9% |
| 46 | November 20, 1988 | "Saigo no Shutsujin" (最後の出陣) | Seiji Ōmori | 35.3% |
| 47 | November 27, 1988 | "Mikatagahara no Tatakai" (三方ヶ原の戦い) | Akihiko Shigemitsu | 38.1% |
| 48 | December 4, 1988 | "Shingen Taoreru" (信玄倒れる) | Teru Tajima | 37.8% |
| 49 | December 11, 1988 | "Maboroshi no Miyako" (幻の都) | Akihiko Shigemitsu | 38.1% |
| 50 | December 18, 1988 | "Kamigami no Tasogare" (神々のたそがれ) | Akihiko Shigemitsu | 37.1% |
Average rating 39.2% - Rating is based on Japanese Video Research (Kantō region).
