= Siege of Shika Castle =

- Part of the Sengoku period
Date	8–23 September 1547
Location	Shika Castle, Shinano Province, Japan
Result	Takeda victory
Territorial changes	Castle falls to Takeda Shingen

Belligerents
Takeda clan	Castle garrison

Commanders and leaders
Takeda Shingen; Itagaki Nobukata	Kasahara Kiyoshige †

Strength
3,000	2,600

The siege of Shika Castle, which took place in September 1547, was one of many battles fought in Takeda Shingen's bid to seize control of Shinano Province.

== Background ==
The battle took place during the 16th-century Sengoku period, also known as the "Age of Civil War". After the Ōnin War (1467–77), the shōgun's system and taxation had increasingly less control outside the province of the capital in Kyoto, and powerful lords (daimyōs) began to assert themselves. Such lords gained power by usurpation, warfare or marriage—any means that would safeguard their position. It was manifested in yamajiro ("mountain castles"), which overlooked the provinces.

One of the most ambitious and successful warlords of the period was Takeda Shingen, the daimyō of the Takeda clan, which dominated Kai Province. Bordering Kai to the north was Shinano Province, a large mountainous territory which was not controlled by a single clan but by several relatively weak ones, notably the Suwa, Ogasawara, Murakami and Takato. As such it was an attractive target to its neighbours, in particular the Takeda to the south and Uesugi clan of Echigo Province to the north. Takeda Shingen's father, Takeda Nobutora, had already made a probing expedition into Shinano in 1536 (leading to the Battle of Un no Kuchi), and after becoming daimyō himself Shingen mounted his own invasion in 1542, which ended with the successful conquest of the Suwa, and then followed that up with the defeat of the Takato in 1543-5, and of the turncoat Oi Sadakiyo in 1546. Fresh from the defeat of the Sadakiyo, in 1547 he then turned his attention to Shika Castle, controlled by Kasahara Kiyoshige. Securing this castle would secure the Takeda position in the Saku Valley and enable Shingen to advance on into the northern half of Shinano.

== Siege ==
Takeda Shingen laid siege to the castle on 8 September 1547. This move alarmed Uesugi Norimasa, who feared that Shingen might conquer the whole of Shinano if left unchecked. He therefore sent an army into the province to relieve Shika, commanded by Kanai Hidekage, but Shingen ambushed and defeated this force at the battle of Odaihara. The Takeda forces collected the severed heads of 15 samurai and around 300 ashigaru from the battlefield at Odaihara and subsequently paraded these round the walls of Shika in a bid to intimidate the garrison into surrender. Kasahara continued to hold out nevertheless, but then at noon on 23 September a fire broke out within the castle, greatly damaging the defences. Shingen seized the opportunity to mount an assault that evening, in which Kasahara was killed.

== Aftermath ==
The fall of Shika spurred Murakami Yoshikiyo, the most powerful Shinano daimyō, into moving against the Takeda, and in 1548 he succeeded in defeating Shingen at Uedahara. However this was only a temporary setback for Shingen, who went back on the offensive in Shinano in 1550 and drove Yoshikiyo out of Shinano after the 1553 Siege of Katsurao. This in turn prompted a renewed Uesugi intervention in Shinano, led by their new daimyō Uesugi Kenshin, which culminated in the famous Battles of Kawanakajima.

== In popular culture ==
Takeda Shingen's famous display of severed heads before the walls of Shika is depicted in the 1969 Japanese film Fūrin Kazan ('Samurai Banners'), which follows the careers of Shingen and his general Yamamoto Kansuke.
