= Fūrin Kazan (TV series) =

Japanese TV series

- Written by: Sumio Ōmori
- Directed by: Kazuhiko Shimizu
- Starring: Masaaki Uchino; Ichikawa Kamejirō II; Gackt; Chizuru Ikewaki; Yuki Shibamoto; Akio Kaneda; Seiichi Tanabe; Kazuya Takahashi; Kai Shishido; Shōsuke Tanihara; Ryuta Sato; Shihori Kanjiya; Asami Mizukawa; Misa Shimizu; Naomi Nishida; Makoto Matsui; Miyoko Asada; Tokuma Nishioka; Kuranosuke Sasaki; Fumiyo Kohinata; Toshiyuki Nagashima; Masatō Ibu; Ichikawa Sadanji IV; Takeshi Katō; Raita Ryū; Jun Fubuki; Shiho Fujimura; Sonny Chiba; Ken Ogata; Tatsuya Nakadai
- Theme music composer: Akira Senju
- Opening theme: Ken Takaseki and NHK Symphony Orchestra
- Composer: Akira Senju
- Country of origin: Japan
- Original language: Japanese
- No. of episodes: 50

Production
- Executive producer: Hisaaki Wakaizumi
- Running time: approx. 43 min.

Original release
- Network: NHK
- Release: January 7 – December 16, 2007

Fūrin Kazan (風林火山) is the 46th NHK Taiga drama television series that began on January 7, 2007. It was aired throughout 2007, with the last episode aired December 16, 2007. Its official English title is The Trusted Confidant.

The story, to a large extent, was an adaptation of Yasushi Inoue's 1959 historical novel of the same title (published in English under the title The Samurai Banner of Furin Kazan). The four characters of the title, from left to right are wind, woods, fire, and mountain. The title is a reference to the war banner used by Takeda Shingen, which in turn was taken from Sun Tzu's The Art of War. It means "Swift as the Wind, Silent as a Forest, Fierce as Fire and Immovable as a Mountain."

== Plot ==
Set in the Sengoku period, it depicts the life of Yamamoto Kansuke who is known as one of Takeda Shingen's renowned strategists, as well as life of Takeda Shingen and Uesugi Kenshin among others.

== Production ==
Production Credits

- Director – Kazuhiko Shimizu
- Screenwriter – Sumio Ōmori
- Based on the novel by – Yasushi Inoue
- Narrator – Sachiko Kagami
- Music – Akira Senju
- Titling – Kōji Kakinuma
- Historical research – Shunroku Shibatsuji
- Action director – Kunishirō Hayashi
- Architectural research – Sei Hirai
- Clothing research – Kiyoko Koizumi
- Production coordinator – Hisaaki Wakaizumi

== Starring ==
=== Yamamoto family ===
- Yamamoto Kansuke: Masaaki Uchino
- Mitsu: Shihori Kanjiya
- Ritsu: Aki Maeda

=== Kuzukasa village ===
- Kawaramura Denbei: Yoshiki Arizono
- Hazuki: Juri Manase
- Kuzukasa Takichi: Jiyuu Arima
- Okuma: Aoi Asada
- Yazaki Heizō: Ryuta Satō
- Hisa: Asami Mizukawa

=== Takeda family ===
- Takeda Shingen: Ichikawa Kamejirō II
  - young Shingen and Suwa Katsuyori: Sōsuke Ikematsu
- Princess Yū: Yuki Shibamoto
- Lady Sanjō: Chizuru Ikewaki
- Princess Ogoto: Mahiru Konno
- Takeda Nobutora: Tatsuya Nakadai
- Lady Ooi: Jun Fubuki
- Takeda Nobushige: Noritoshi Kashiwa
- Takeda Nobukado: Toshinobu Matsuo
- Nene: Sachiko Sakurai
- Takeda Yoshinobu: Ryo Kimura

=== Takeda Shingen's vassals ===
- Itagaki Nobukata: Sonny Chiba
- Amari Torayasu: Raita Ryu
- Obu Toramasa: Akio Kaneda
- Morozumi Torasada: Takeshi Katō
- Oyamada Nobuari: Seiichi Tanabe
- Baba Nobuharu: Kazuya Takahashi
- Hara Toratane: Kai Shishido
- Komai Masatake: Issei Takahashi
- Kosaka Masanobu: Koutaro Tanaka
- Yamagata Masakage: Yasuyuki Maekawa
- Akiyama Nobutomo: Hidekazu Ichinose
- Sanada Yukitaka: Kuranosuke Sasaki
- Shinome: Misa Shimizu
- Sanada Gengorō: Kaito Kobayashi
- Aiki Ichibe: Yoshimasa Kondō
- Akabe Shimotsuke: Susumu Terajima
- Princess Miru: Yōko Maki
- Shima: Akemi Omori
- Hagino: Miyoko Asada
- Kinu: Moeko Ezawa

=== Uesugi clan ===
- Uesugi Kenshin: Gackt
- Usami Sadamitsu: Ken Ogata
- Naoe Sanetsuna: Tokuma Nishioka
- Kakizaki Kageie: Kenichi Kaneda
- Honjō Saneyori: Gen Kimura
- Ōkuma Tomohide: Gorō Ōhashi
- Momo: Naomi Nishida
- Nami: Fusako Urabe
- Uesugi Norimasa: Ichikawa Sadanji
- Tatsuwakamaru: Taiga
- Nagano Narimasa: Mantarō Koichi
- Uesugi Sadazane: Mizuho Suzuki

=== Imagawa clan ===
- Imagawa Yoshimoto: Shōsuke Tanihara
- Jukeini: Shiho Fujimura
- Taigen Sessai: Masatō Ibu
- Imagawa Ujizane: Yukijirō Kazama
- Ihara Tadatane: Renji Ishibashi
- Matsudaira Motoyasu: Keisuke Sakamoto

=== Later Hōjō clan ===
- Hōjō Ujiyasu: Makoto Matsui
- Hōjō Ujitsuna: Tōru Shinagawa
- Hōjō Ujimasa: Saotome Taichi
- Hōjō Tsunashige: Tamotsu Ishibashi
- Shimizu Yoshimasa: Tadashi Yokouchi

=== Other Daimyō of Shinano Province ===
- Murakami Yoshikiyo: Toshiyuki Nagashima
- Suwa Yorishige: Fumiyo Kohinata
- Suwa Yoritaka: Kenshō Ono
- Ogasawara Nagatoki: Akihiko Imai
- Takatō Yoritsugu: Shōzō Uesugi
- Kojima Gorozaemon: Nobuhiko Takada
- Takanashi Masayori: Akira Otaka

=== Others ===
- Aoki Daizen: Wataru Shihodō
- Ofuku: Mako Midori
- Oda Nobunaga: Jirō Sakuma
- Seiin: Kei Satō
- Hiraga Genshin: Shun Sugata
- Narita Nagayasu: Gō Rijū
- Ise: Haruka Igawa
- Tsuda Kenmotsu: Kōtarō Yoshida

== Episodes ==
- Episode 1 - The One-Eyed Man
- Episode 2 - Farewell, Birthplace
- Episode 3 - Marici's Wife
- Episode 4 - Demon of Vengeance
- Episode 5 - Suruga Rebellion
- Episode 6 - The Road to Employment
- Episode 7 - Harunobu's First Battle
- Episode 8 - Surprise Attack! Unnokuchi
- Episode 9 - Kansuke's Death
- Episode 10 - Harunobu Commits Treason
- Episode 11 - Nobutora's Banishment
- Episode 12 - Kansuke Gains Employment
- Episode 13 - The Uninvited Man
- Episode 14 - Flag of Sun Tzu
- Episode 15 - The Invasion of Suwa
- Episode 16 - The Fated Encounter
- Episode 17 - The Princess' Tears
- Episode 18 - To Live or to Die?
- Episode 19 - The Cursed Flute
- Episode 20 - Birth of a Tactician
- Episode 21 - The Princess' Disappearance
- Episode 22 - Clash of the Three Provinces
- Episode 23 - Night Attack at Kawagoe
- Episode 24 - The Dragon of Echigo
- Episode 25 - A Cruel Law
- Episode 26 - A Painful Victory
- Episode 27 - The Strongest Enemy
- Episode 28 - Death of Two Great Men
- Episode 29 - Counterattack! The Takeda Army
- Episode 30 - The Road Towards Subjugating the Country
- Episode 31 - The Treacherous Castle
- Episode 32 - Infiltrating Echigo
- Episode 33 - Kansuke is Captured
- Episode 34 - Sanada's Desire
- Episode 35 - The Princess' Battle
- Episode 36 - Women of Fate
- Episode 37 - Mother's Will
- Episode 38 - Subjugating Murakami
- Episode 39 - Kawanakajima! Clash Between the Dragon and Tiger
- Episode 40 - The Triple Alliance
- Episode 41 - The Princess' Death
- Episode 42 - The Tactician and the God of War
- Episode 43 - Birth of Shingen
- Episode 44 - Shingen's Assassination
- Episode 45 - The Scheme! Okehazama
- Episode 46 - The Kanto Expedition
- Episode 47 - Night Before the Decisive Battle
- Episode 48 - The Crucial Moment- Kawanakajima
- Episode 49 - Desperate Struggle - Kawanakajima
- Episode 50 - The Decisive Battle - Kawanakajima

== Soundtrack and books ==
=== Soundtrack ===
- Fūrin Kazan (EMI Music Japan)
- Fūrin Kazan, Last Part (EMI Music Japan)

=== Books ===
Official guide

- NHK Taiga Drama Story Fūrin Kazan First Part ISBN 978-4-14-923345-1 (December 20, 2006)
- NHK Taiga Drama Story Fūrin Kazan Last Part ISBN 978-4-14-923346-8 (June 25, 2007)
- NHK Taiga Drama, Historical handbook, Fūrin Kazan ISBN 978-4-14-910617-5 (December 2006)

Novel

- NHK Taiga Drama 1, Volume of Wind ISBN 978-4-14-005509-0 (November 2006)
- NHK Taiga Drama 2, Volume of Forest ISBN 978-4-14-005510-6 (March 2007)
- NHK Taiga Drama 3, Volume of Fire ISBN 978-4-14-005511-3 (June 2007)
- NHK Taiga Drama 4, Volume of Mountain ISBN 978-4-14-005512-0 (September 2007)

Photobook

- Ryu no Kenshin with Gackt by photographer Seiichi Nomura (NHK Publishing) ISBN 978-4-14-081263-1 (November 2007)
