= Kasahara Kiyoshige =

Japanese commander

- Died: 23 September 1547; Shiga Castle, Shinano Province, Japan
- Occupation: Commander of Shiga Castle

Kasahara Kiyoshige (died 23 September 1547) was a Japanese commander of Shiga Castle in Shinano Province, during the country's Sengoku period. He commanded it until Takeda Singen, the head of the Takeda clan, seized it in September 1547, during his military campaign to control the province. After the castle's garrison was shown to have no relieving army, a fire started inside, which Kiyoshige died in.

== Military career ==
Kiyoshige commanded the garrison at Shiga Castle (also spelled Shika Castle). A white kikyo (Chinese bellflower) on a green background was used as Kiyoshige's mon on all of his flags.

Takeda Shingen, head of the Takeda clan, started a military campaign to take control of Shinano Province in 1542. He had captured multiple castles over the following years, and went to take Shiga Castle in 1547. Shingen began the siege on 8 September. He cut off the castle's water supply and subjected the garrison to a "slow and dreadful death from thirst", but the castle held out. Kiyoshige had optimism that Uesegi Norimasa would arrive from Kozuke province and save him. Soon, Usuegi's forces, led by Kanai Hidekage, crossed Usui Pass from Kozuke with 3,000 men. Shingen had one part of his army continue the siege, while Itagaki Nobutaka and others would meet Usuegi's forces. At the Battle of Odaihara on 19 September, Shingen's forces defeated Usuegi's, but Kiyoshige would not surrender. Shingen's forces collected the heads of members of Uesugi's Odaihara forces (15 senior samurai and 300 ashigaru), displayed them on spear shafts, and paraded them in front of Shiga Castle. This showed there was no relieving army. At noon on September 23, a fire started in the castle, which killed Kiyoshige and 200 of the castle's garrison. The garrison's women and children were rounded up and sent to Kofu as slaves. At some point, Shingen's forces "wiped out" Kiyoshige's family. The capture of Shiga brought Takeda territory closer to the territory of the strongest daimyo in Shinano, Murakami Yoshikiyo.

== Media depictions ==
Kiyoshige was depicted in the 1969 film Samurai Banners, where he was played by Ryūnosuke Tsukigata, and in the 2007 television series Fūrin Kazan.

== Sources ==
- Turnbull, Stephen (2002). Samurai Heraldry, Osprey Publishing. ISBN 9781841763040
- Turnbull, Stephen (2003). Kawanakajima 1553–64: Samurai Power Struggle, Osprey Publishing. ISBN 9781841765624
