= Siege of Katsurao =

1553 siege in Japan

- Part of the Sengoku period
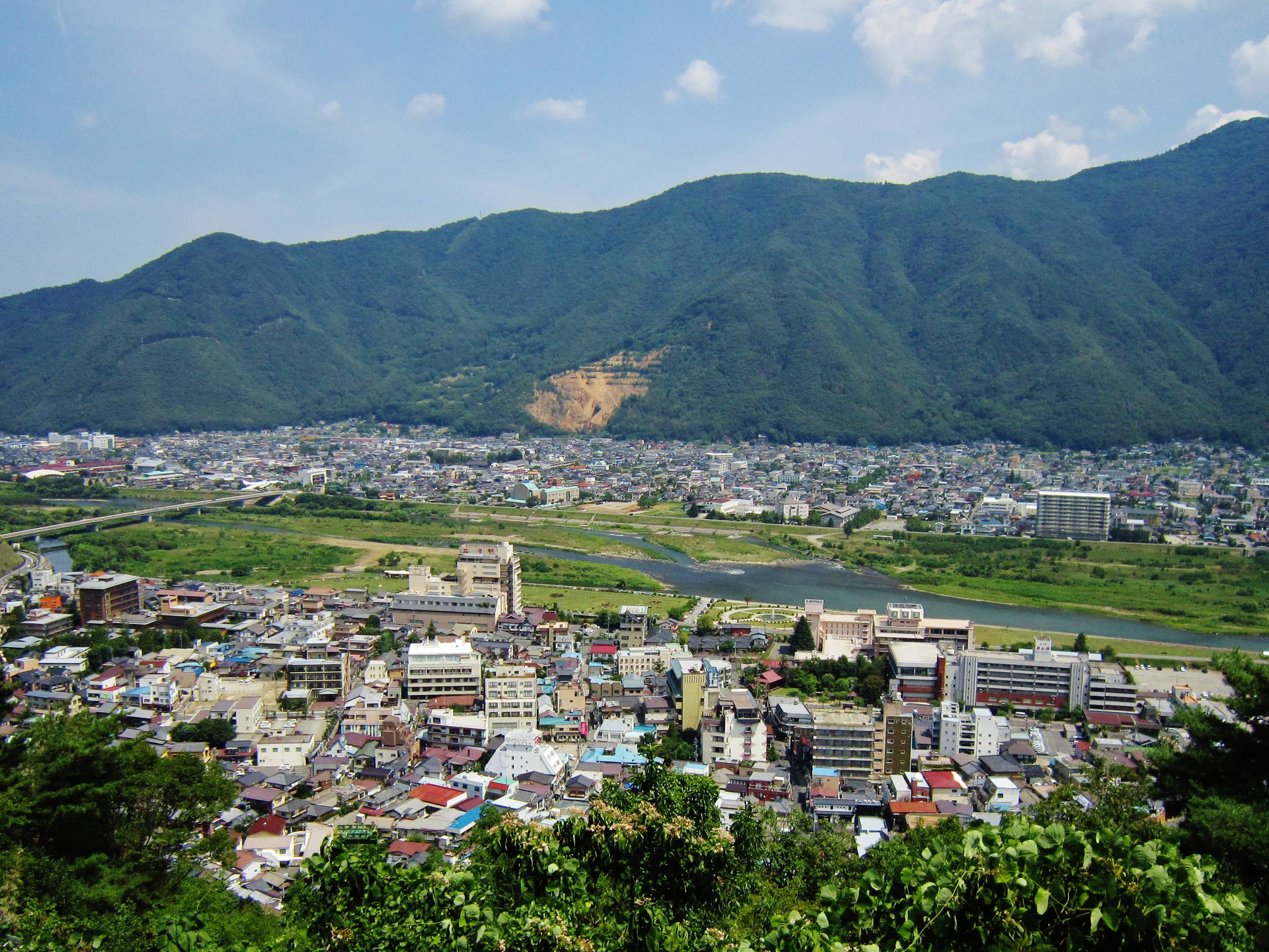
- Chikuma, Nagano. The site of the (now levelled) Katsurao Castle is located within its urban area.
Date	1553
Location	Katsurao, Shinano province
Result	Takeda victory
Territorial changes	Katsurao falls to Takeda Shingen; Murakami clan driven out of Shinano Province

Belligerents
Takeda clan	Murakami clan

Commanders and leaders
Takeda Shingen; Takeda Nobushige; Takeda Yoshinobu	Murakami Yoshikiyo

Strength
4,200	6,000

The 1553 siege of Katsurao was one of many sieges undertaken by the warlord Takeda Shingen in his long campaign to gain control of Japan's Shinano province, which was ruled by a hodgepodge of minor daimyō, notably the Suwa, Ogasawara, Murakami and Takato.

Shingen mounted his first invasion of Shinano in 1542 and steadily worked his way northwards, defeating the Suwa and Takato by 1547. His inexorable advance through the province alarmed the Uesugi clan, which controlled Echigo province to the north, and in 1547 Uesugi Norimasa sent an army into the province to confront Shingen, but this was swept aside at Odaihara. At this point the Murakami and Ogasawara finally entered the fray, and Murakami Yoshikiyo succeeded in defeating Shingen at Uedahara (1548), but Shingen regrouped and went back on the offensive. Identifying Yoshikiyo as the greater threat, he decided to concentrate his initial efforts on the weaker Ogasawara, and in 1550 he seized their principal castle at Fukashi, in modern Matsumoto, forcing their daimyo Ogasawara Nagatoki to flee and seek sanctuary with his ally Murakami Yoshikiyo at Katsurao.

Takeda Shingen then turned his attention to the Murakami, and after some difficulty succeeded in reducing their stronghold at Tosihi in 1551. After another two years of gruelling fighting the Takeda were finally ready to move against Katsurao itself, and Shingen entrusted the task to his brother Takeda Nobushige and son Takeda Yoshinobu. In the end Murakami resistance melted away, and uncle and nephew succeeded in reducing Katsurao after just seven days of fighting.

== Aftermath ==
The fall of Katsurao broke the back of Murakami resistance to the Takeda, and most of the clan's followers subsequently went over to Shingen, while its leadership scrambled to escape Shinano Province. According to legend, in the aftermath of the siege Yoshikyo's wife found herself caught up in a stream of refugees attempting to get across the Chikuma River, and struggled to find a place on one of the ferries as the boatmen did not recognise her. Only after she had removed her hairpin and let her hair down did one of them realise that she was a noblewoman, whereupon he helped her get across the river to safety. As for Yoshikyo himself, he escaped into Echigo province, where he found refuge with the local lord Uesugi Kenshin. The fall of the Murakami convinced Kenshin that he would have to intervene in Shinano to prevent Shingen seizing control of the entire province, and his resulting invasions led to the famous Battles of Kawanakajima.
