= Kansuke Yamamoto =

Kansuke Yamamoto may refer to:

- Yamamoto Kansuke (general) (山本 勘助) (1501–1561), Japanese samurai warrior
- Kansuke Yamamoto (artist) (山本 悍右) (1914–1987), Japanese avant-garde poet-photographer and editor
