= General Yamamoto =

General Yamamoto may refer to:

- Yamamoto Gonnohyōe (1852–1933), Prime Minister of Japan
- Isoroku Yamamoto (1884–1943), Japanese admiral in World War II, also called "General Yamamoto"
- Yamamoto Kansuke (general) (1501–1561)
- List of Soul Reapers in Bleach#Genryūsai Shigekuni Yamamoto, fictional character, also called "captain" and/or "general" Yamamoto
