= Hara Masatane =

Japanese Samurai (1531–1575)

- 原 昌胤
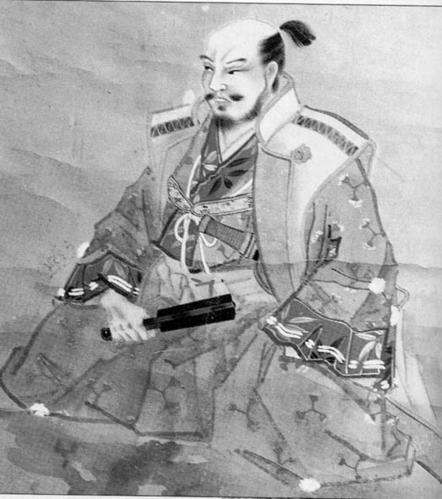
- Born: 1531
- Died: June 29, 1575 (aged 43–44)
- Relatives: Hara Toratane
- Military career
- Allegiance: Takeda clan
- Conflicts: Battle of Mimasetoge (1569); Battle of Nagashino (1575)

Hara Masatane (原 昌胤; 1531 – June 29, 1575) was a senior retainer of the Takeda clan during the late Sengoku period of Japanese history. He was known as one of the 'Twenty-Four Generals of Takeda Shingen'.

== Military life ==
He was present at the Battle of Mimasetoge in 1569 and was killed in the forefront of the fighting in the Battle of Nagashino in 1575.

== Personal life ==
Masatane was a relative of Hara Toratane, though from a different branch of the family, and was also a skilled commander.
