= Katsurao Castle =

Castle in Nagano, Japan

Katurao Castle
- 葛尾城
- Sakaki, Nagano Prefecture, Japan
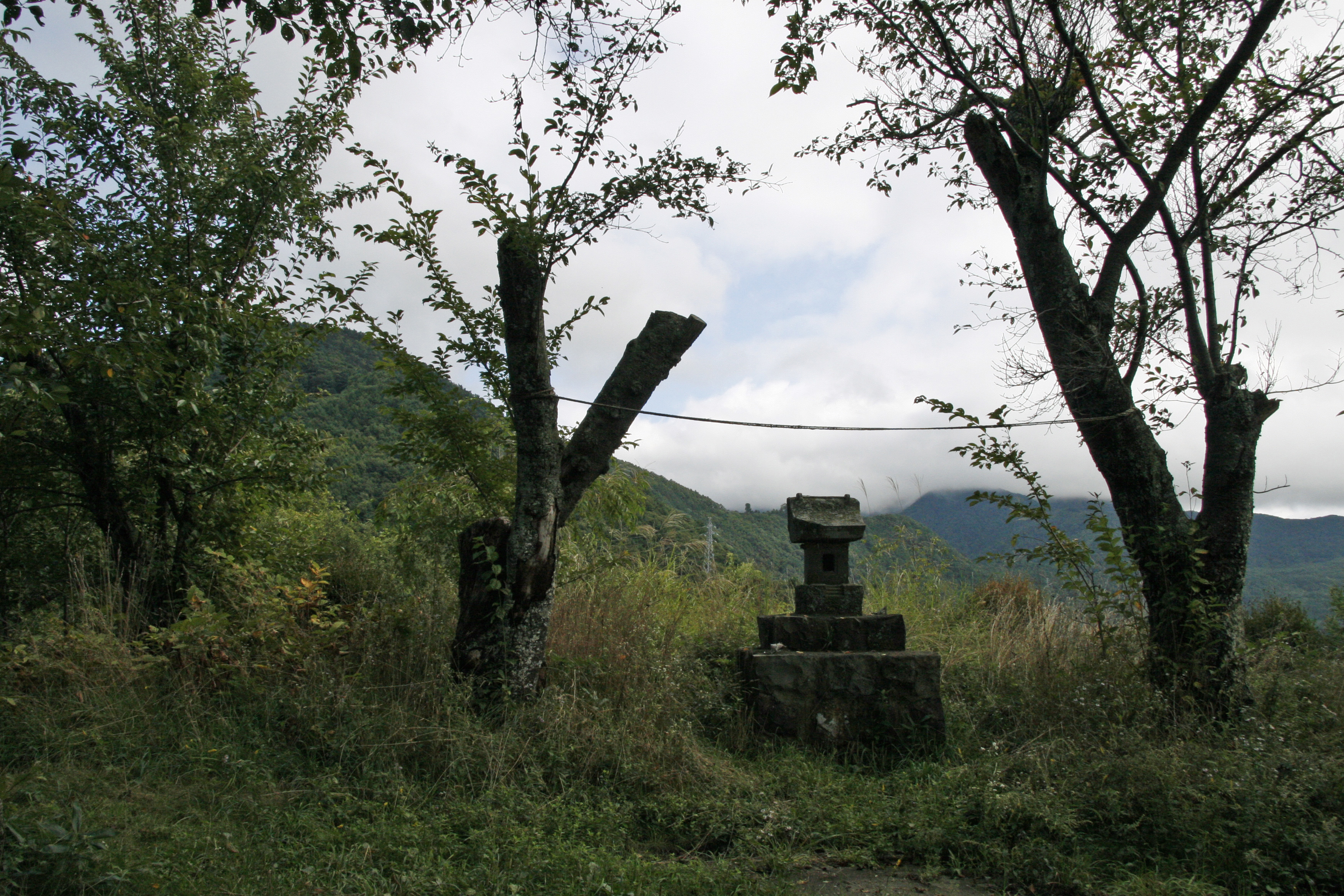
- Katsurao Castle

Site information
- Type: Yamajiro-style castle
- Owner: Murakami clan, Takeda clan, Uesugi clan
- Condition: ruins

Site history
- Built: Muromachi period
- Built by: Murakami clan
- Demolished: 1600
- Events: Siege of Katsurao

Garrison information
- Past commanders: Murakami Yoshikiyo

Katusrao Castle (葛尾城, Katsurao-jō)) is the remains of a castle structure in Sakaki, Nagano Prefecture, Japan. It is located on a 816-meter mountain. The castle was a main bastion of the Murakami clan.

In, 1553, the castle was attacked by Takeda Shingen, Murakami Yoshikiyo abandoned the castle and fled to Echigo, seeking Nagao Kagetora's help. As a result, the Battle of Kawanakajima happened.

Its ruins have been protected as a Prefectural Historic Sites. The site is now only ruins, with some stone walls, moats, and earthworks.

== See also ==
- List of Historic Sites of Japan (Nagano)
