= Samurai Banners =

- Directed by: Hiroshi Inagaki
- Screenplay by: Shinobu Hashimoto; Takeo Kunihiro
- Based on: Furin kazan by Yasushi Inoue
- Produced by: Toshiro Mifune; Tomoyuki Tanaka; Yoshio Nishikawa; Hiroshi Inagaki
- Starring: Toshiro Mifune; Yoshiko Sakuma; Nakamura Kinnosuke; Yūjirō Ishihara; Kan'emon Nakamura
- Cinematography: Kazuo Yamada
- Edited by: Yoshihiro Araki
- Music by: Masaru Sato
- Production company: Mifune Productions
- Distributed by: Toho
- Release date: 1 February 1969 (Japan)
- Running time: 165 minutes
- Country: Japan

Samurai Banners (Japanese: 風林火山, Hepburn: Fūrin Kazan) is a Japanese samurai drama film released in 1969. It was directed by Hiroshi Inagaki and is based on the novel Furin kazan by Yasushi Inoue.

== Plot ==
Yamamoto Kansuke (Toshiro Mifune) is a general of warlord Takeda Shingen (Nakamura Kinnosuke), whose titular red banners are his trademark. Yamamoto has a ruthless but effective approach to battle and politics, and advises Takeda Shingen on almost everything he does, including the assassination of Suwa Yorishige (Akihiko Hirata). Of Lord Suwa's household, Princess Yu (Yoshiko Sakuma) refuses to commit suicide, and the film comes to center on a love triangle between the lord, his general, and the princess.

The film ends with the fourth Battle of Kawanakajima, in which Yamamoto erroneously believes his battle tactics have failed and commits a pincer attack, but is killed in action before the battle is won.

== Cast ==
- Toshiro Mifune – Kansuke Yamamoto
- Yoshiko Sakuma – Princess Yuu
- Nakamura Kinnosuke – Shingen Takeda
- Yujiro Ishihara – Kenshin Uesugi
- Katsuo Nakamura – Nobusato Itagaki
- Nakamura Kankurō V – Katsuyori Takeda
- Kan'emon Nakamura – Nobukata Itagaki
- Masakazu Tamura – Nobushige Takeda
- Mayumi Ozora – Princess Okoto
- Masao Shimizu : Yokota Takamatsu
- Ryūnosuke Tsukigata: Kasahara Kiyoshige
- Akihiko Hirata : Yorishige Suwa
- Ryosuke Kagawa : Nagasaka Yorihiro
- Yoshiko Kuga : Dame Sanjō
- Sachio Sakai : Yamagata Masakage
- Akira Kubo : Baba Nobuharu
- Yoshio Tsuchiya : Tsuchiya Masatsugu
- Takashi Shimura – Toramasa Obu
- Ken Ogata : Hatanaka

== Release ==
Samurai Banners received a roadshow release in Japan by Toho on 1 February 1969. It received a wide release in Japan on 1 March 1969. The film was Toho's top-grossing film of the year and the top-grossing film among domestic releases in Japan in 1969.

The film was released in the United States by Toho International under the title Under the Banner of the Samurai on June 24, 1969. It was later released to home video as Samurai Banners.

== Reception ==
"Mosk." of Variety found that "even Mifune's unique presence fails to give this many new twists and provide dynamic stature or the poetic insights that marked some earlier Japanese films of this genre." The review concluded that "Mifune is spectacular as usual if the film's surface prettiness and melodramatic flourishes, without the deeper classic flair and rightness to make this more than a florid actioner, limit its art potential."
