= Twenty-Four Generals of Takeda Shingen =

Takeda Shingen's most trusted commanders

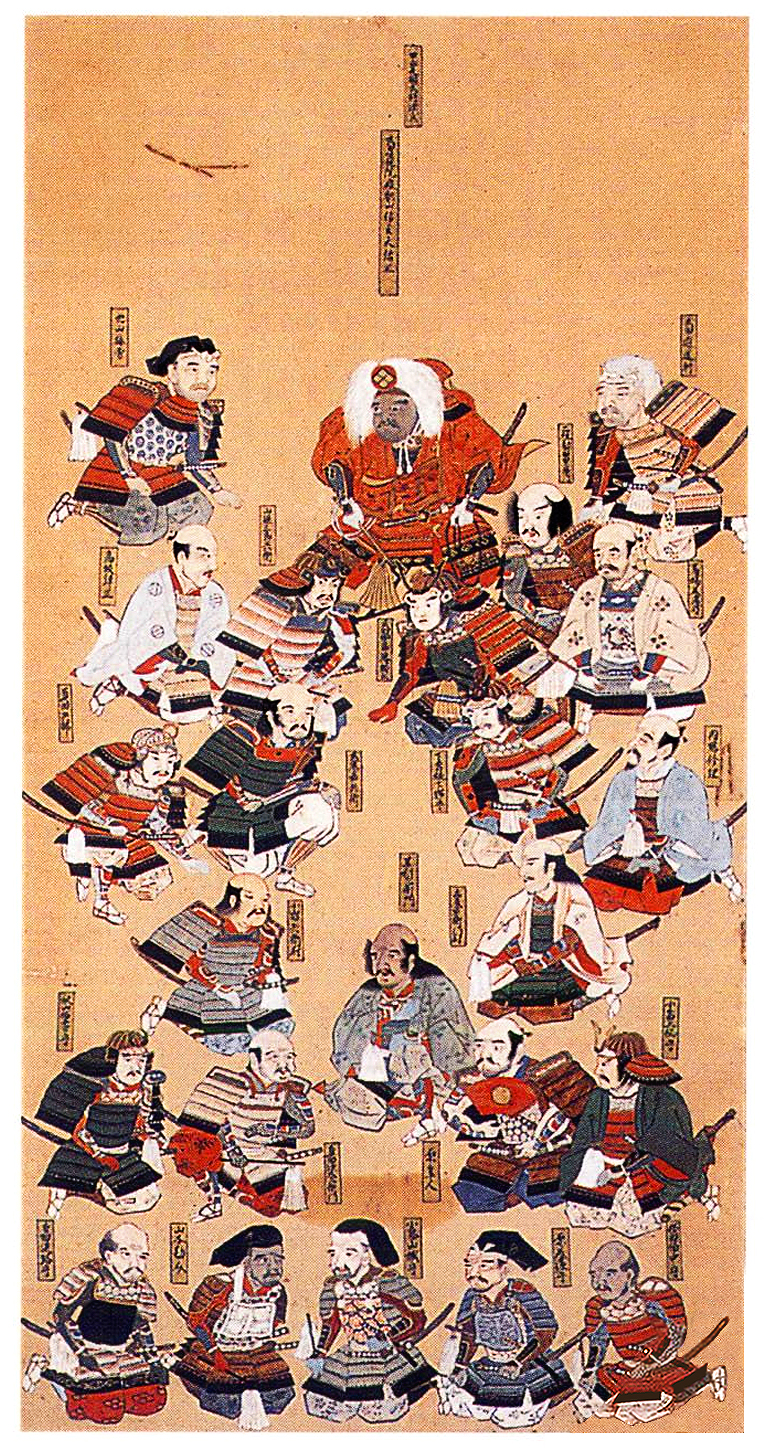
The Twenty-Four Generals, depicted and identified individually on a hanging scroll painting

The Twenty-Four Generals (武田二十四将, Takeda Nijūshi-shō) were just one of many historically famous groupings of battle commanders from Japan's Sengoku Period. These Twenty-Four were the most trusted companions of Takeda Shingen. A third of them died at the famous Battle of Nagashino in 1575 when they led the Takeda forces against Oda Nobunaga. When Takeda Katsuyori committed suicide in 1582, declaring the end of the Takeda clan, only three of them were still serving under the Takeda.

== List ==
In artwork and other historical sources, there is some variation in the list of names. The specific generals are as follows, according to alphabetic order:

- Akiyama Nobutomo – Takeda's second in command; granted more autonomy. d. 1575, following second siege of Iwamura Castle
- Amari Torayasu – d. Battle of Uedahara 1548
- Anayama Nobukimi – following Mikatagahara and Nagashino, allied with Tokugawa Ieyasu and aided in defeat of Takeda Katsuyori
- Baba Nobuharu – fought at Mikatagahara and commanded vanguard of the right wing of Takeda army at Nagashino, where he died.
- Hara Masatane – d. Battle of Nagashino 1575
- Hara Toratane – d. 1564
- Ichijō Nobutatsu – younger brother to Shingen, fought at Nagashino
- Itagaki Nobukata – d. Battle of Uedahara 1548
- Kōsaka Danjō Masanobu - played a major role in the fourth battle of Kawanakajima, but was not present at Nagashino
- Naitō Masatoyo d. Nagashino 1575
- Obata Masamori – led the largest contingent (500 cavalry in the center company) at Nagashino
- Obata Toramori – d. 1561, is recorded as having been wounded 40 times in 30 encounters
- Obu Toramasa d. 1565
- Oyamada Nobushige – fought at Kawanakajima, Mikatagahara, and Nagashino
- Saigusa Moritomo – d. Nagashino 1575
- Sanada Nobutsuna – d. Nagashino 1575
- Sanada Yukitaka – a castle lord in Shinano Province who submitted to Shingen
- Tada Mitsuyori d. 1563
- Takeda Nobukado – brother to Shingen, d. 1575
- Takeda Nobushige – younger brother to Shingen, d. fourth battle of Kawanakajima 1561
- Tsuchiya Masatsugu – fought at Mikatagahara, d. Nagashino 1575; his sons followed Takeda Katsuyori until his death at Temmokuzan in 1582
- Yamagata Masakage – fought at Mikatagahara and Yoshida, d. Nagashino 1575
- Yamamoto Kansuke - strategist of the fourth battle of Kawanakajima in 1561, died in that battle
- Yokota Takatoshi – d. Siege of Toishi 1550

== Gallery ==
Painted by Matsumoto Fūko (1840 - 1923)

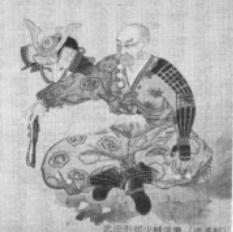
Takeda Nobukado

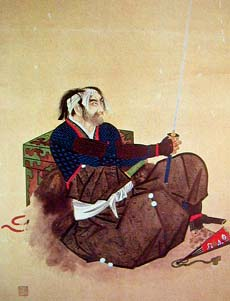
Akiyama Torashige

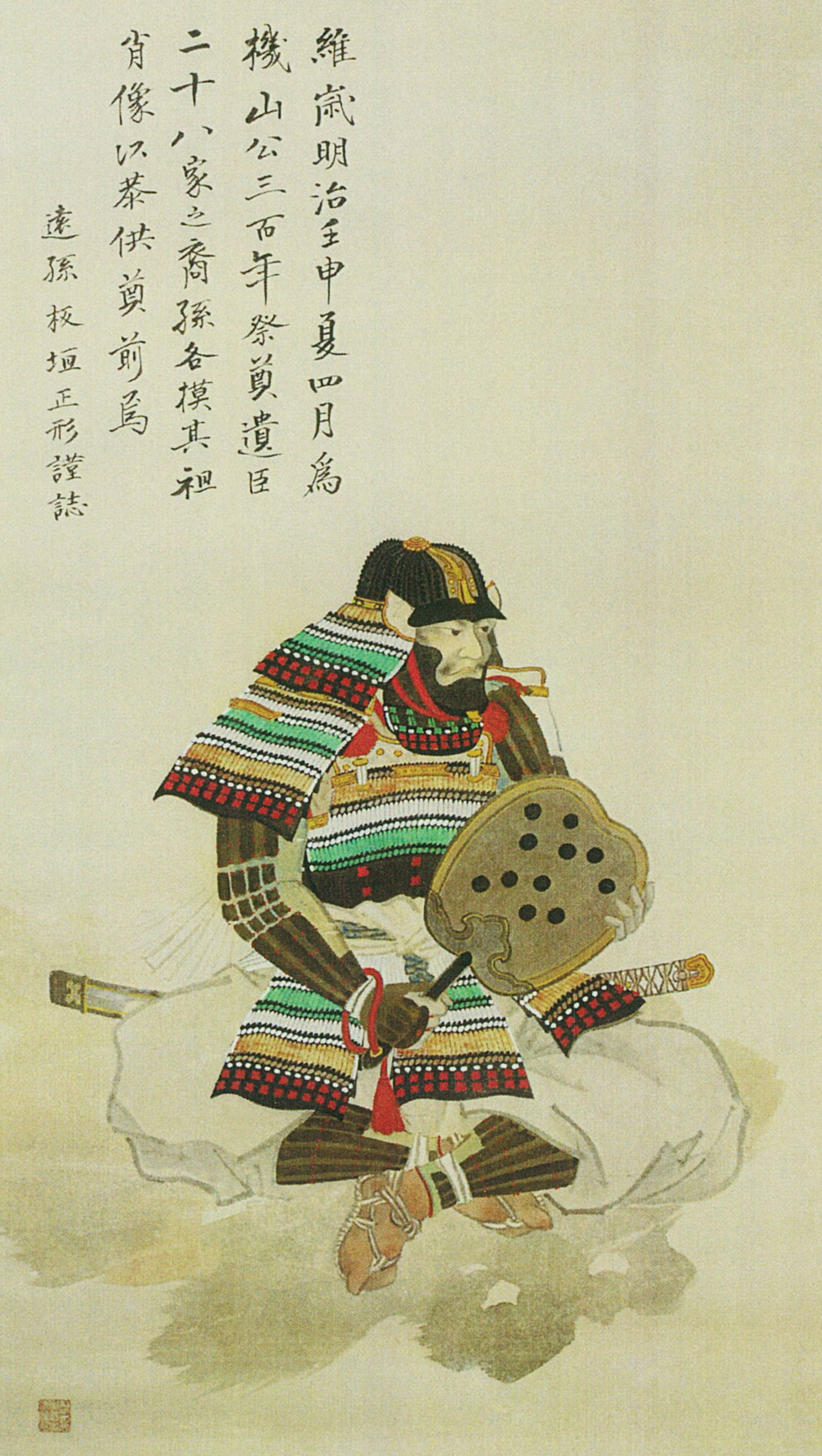
Itagaki Nobukata

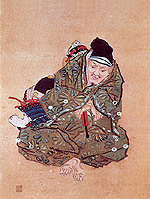
Obata Toramori

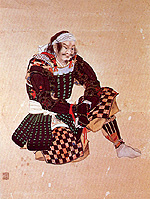
Saigusa Masasada

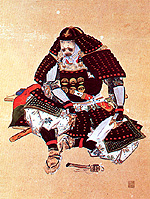
Sanada Nobutsuna

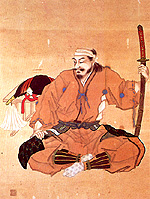
Sone Msayo

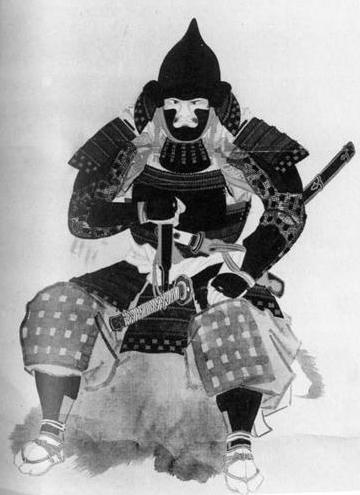
Tada Mitsuyori

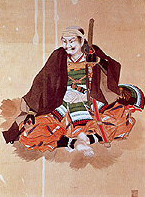
Tsuchiya Masatsugu

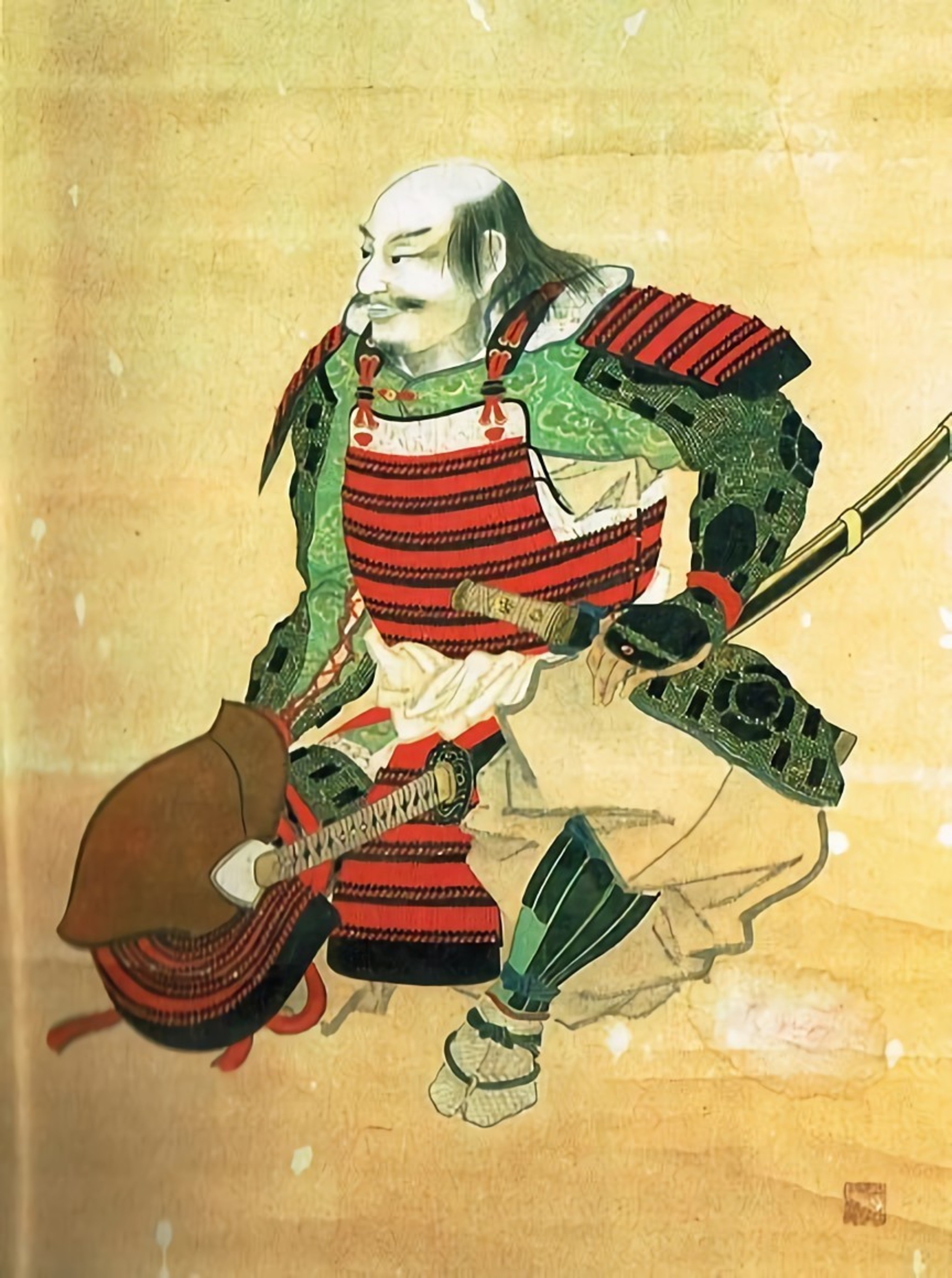
Naito Masatoyo

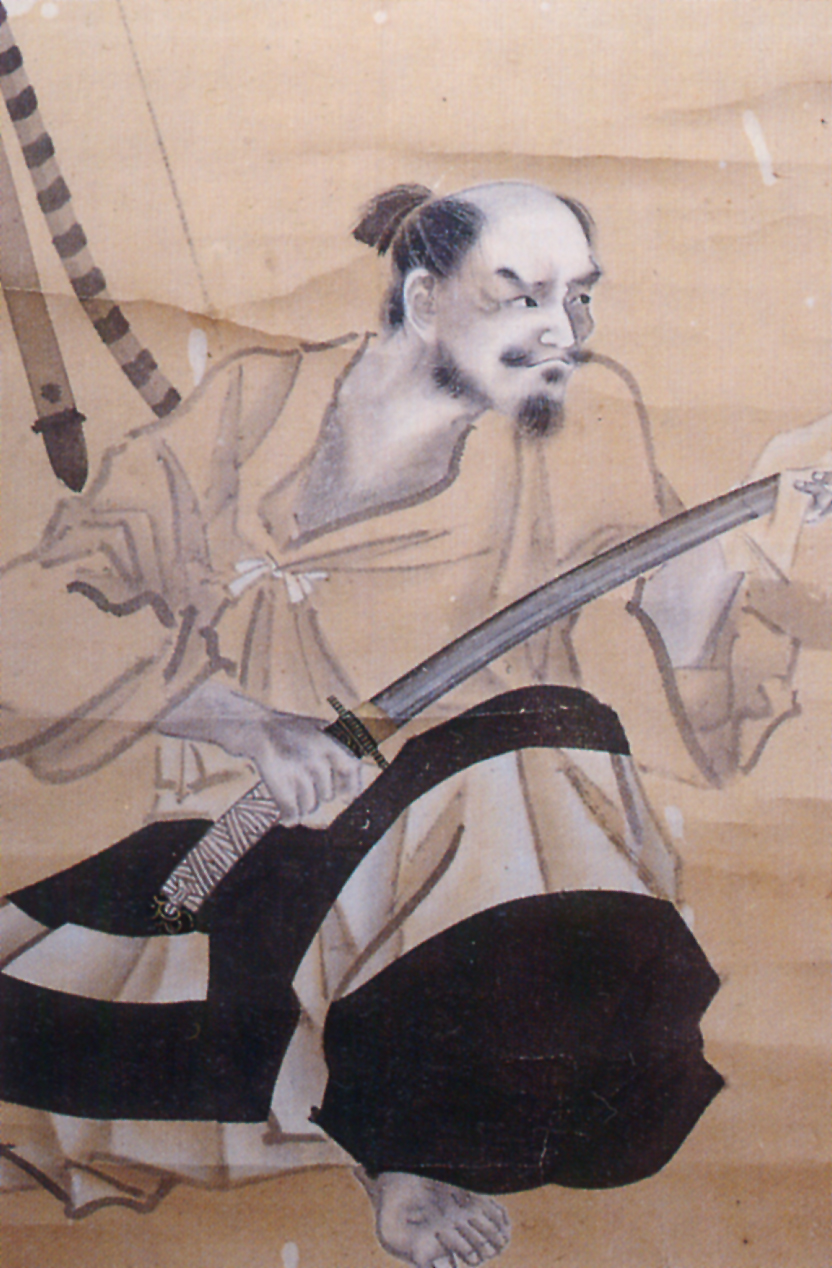
Baba Nobuharu

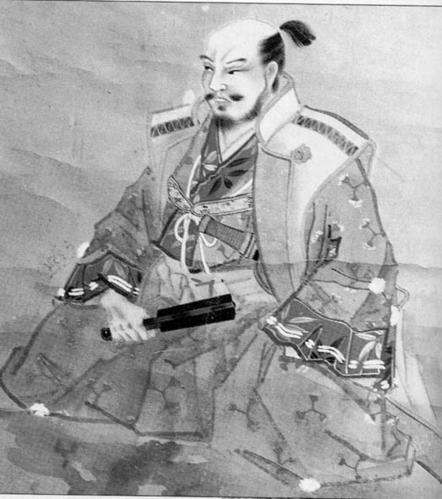
Hara Masatane

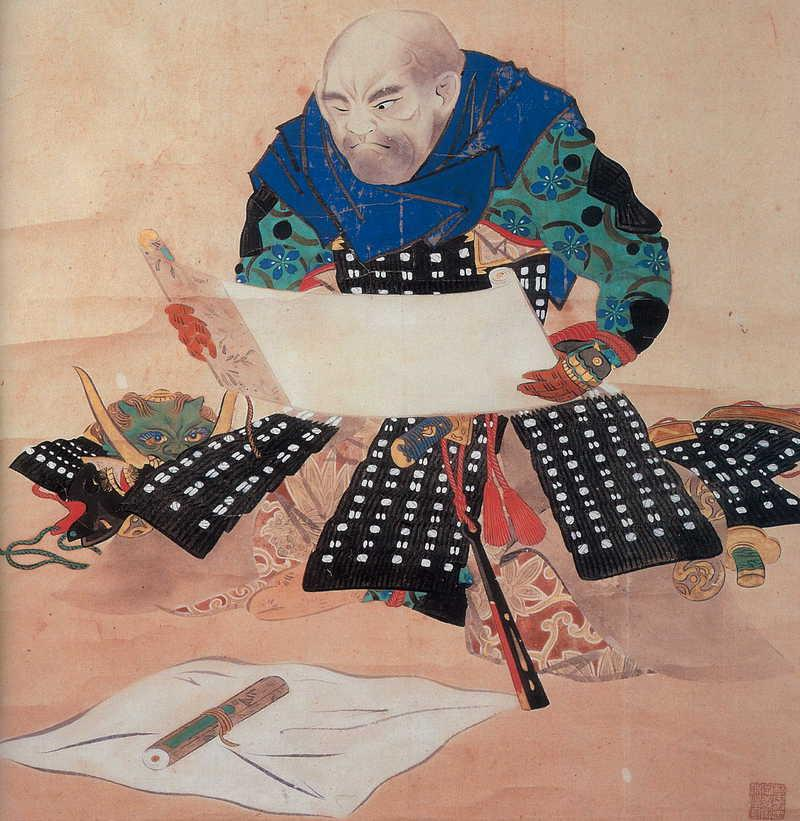
Yamamoto Kansuke

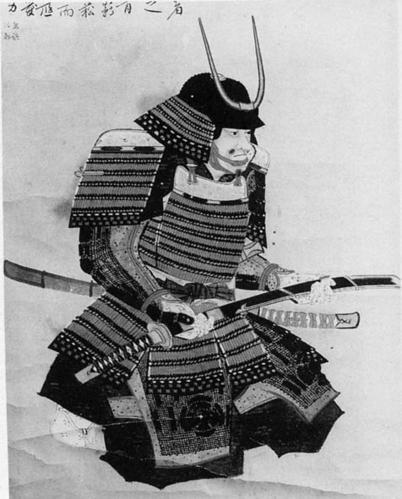
Yokota Takatoshi

== In popular culture ==
During the Edo period, the twenty-four samurai leaders were a popular topic for ukiyo-e and bunraku.

In the computer game Shogun: Total War, there are 25 Takeda generals.

== See also ==
- Seven Spears of Shizugatake
