= Siege of Fukuyo =

1542 siege

- Part of the Sengoku period
Date	1542
Location	Fukuyo, Shinano Province 35°35′07″N 137°55′36″E
Result	Takeda victory

Belligerents
Forces of Tozawa Yorichika	Takeda forces

Commanders and leaders
Tozawa Yorichika	Takeda Shingen; Itagaki Nobukata; Komai Masatake

Strength
3,000	5,000
- Location within Nagano Prefecture Siege of Fukuyo (Japan)

The siege of Fukuyo was one of many steps taken by the Japanese feudal lord Takeda Shingen in his bid to seize control of Shinano Province. The fortress at Fukuyo lay in the Ina valley, south of Lake Suwa. Tozawa Yorichika, an ally of Takatō Yoritsugu, lord of Takatō Castle, surrendered quickly. The Battle of Ankokuji followed the siege.
