= Obata Toramori =

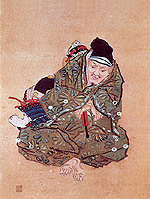
Obata Toramori

Obata Toramori (小畠虎盛, 1491 – July 14, 1561) was a Japanese samurai warrior of the Sengoku Period. He is known as one of the "Twenty-Four Generals of Takeda Shingen"

He also recorded as having been wounded 41 times in 36 encounters. He was the father of Obata Masamori.

== See also ==
- Isao Obata
