= Battle of Ankokuji =

Coordinates: 36°13′17″N 137°13′54″E

- Part of aftermath of Fukuyo
Date	2 November 1542
Location	Ankokuji, Chino City, Nagano Prefecture
Result	Takeda victory

Belligerents
Takeda forces	Takato Yoritsugu's forces

Commanders and leaders
Itagaki Nobukata; Takeda Shingen	Takato Yoritsugu †; Takato Yorimune †

The Battle of Ankokuji (安国寺の戦い) was a battle on 2 November 1542 during the Sengoku period (16th century) of Japan.

The Battle of Ankokuji was a rather minor battle that took place after the fall of Fukuyo, in which Tozawa Yorichika, an ally of Takato Yoritsugu had surrendered to the Takeda forces. Following this, Itagaki Nobukata, a retainer under Takeda Shingen, would personally finish off Yoritsugu at Ankokuji. Yoritsugu's younger brother, Yorimune, however would be killed during this battle.
