= Siege of Odawara (1561) =

1561 siege in Japan

First Siege of Odawara
- Part of Sengoku period
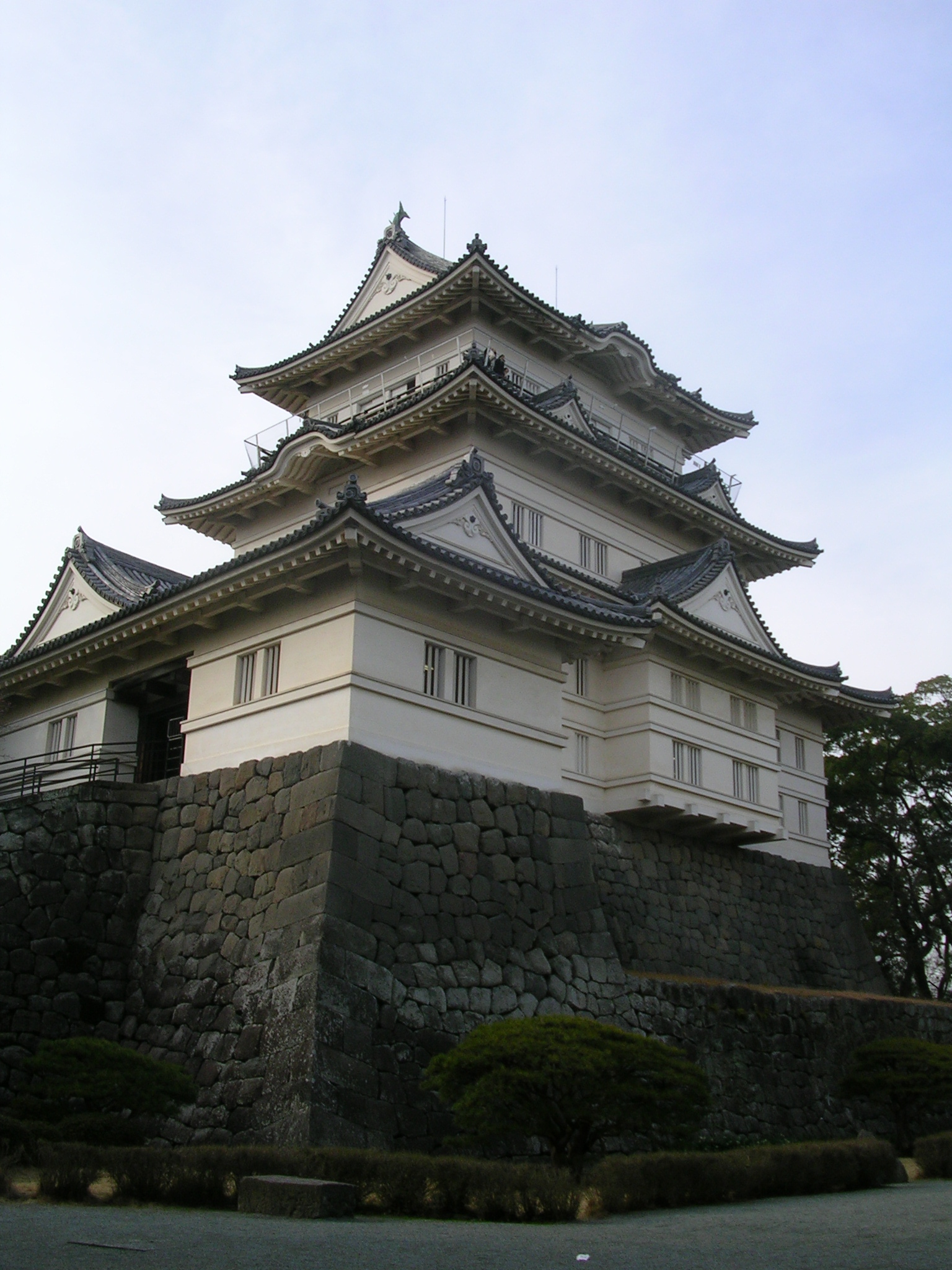
- One corner tower of Odawara Castle today
Date	1561
Location	Odawara Castle, Sagami Province, Japan 35°15′03″N 139°09′13″E
Result	Hōjō victory
Territorial changes	Uesugi withdrawal, castle town burned

Belligerents
Uesugi clan forces	Hōjō clan forces

Commanders and leaders
Uesugi Kenshin; Uesugi Norimasa; Satomi Yoshihiro; Oda Ujiharu; Utsunomiya Hirotsuna; Satake Yoshiaki; Oyama Hidetsuna; Nasu Suketane; Ōta Sukemasa; Mita Tsunahide; Narita Nagayasu	Hōjō Ujiyasu; Hōjō Ujimasa; Hōjō Ujiteru; Hōjō Tsunashige

Strength
90,000–113,000	15,000
- Location within Kanagawa Prefecture Siege of Odawara (1561) (Japan)

In the 1561 siege of Odawara, a battle of Japan's Sengoku period, Uesugi Kenshin attacked Odawara castle. This was the first of several sieges which would befall Odawara castle, the home castle of the Hōjō clan.

== Background ==
In 1559, Kenshin was pushed once again by Uesugi Norimasa to take control of the Kantō back from the Hōjō, and in 1560 he was able to comply. In August of the same year, he put southern Echigo under control of a five-man council for broad mobilization, as well formed a small investigative council for any kind of unrest. In 1561 he marched to Odawara.

Fearing Hojo's expansion, various Kanto lords like the Satake and Satomi joined the Uesugi army, bringing its total strength to around 100,000.

== Siege ==
Uesugi Kenshin was at the height of his campaign against the Hōjō clan, as he captured several of their castles. Kenshin was successful in taking a number of castles from the Hojo clan, like Numata Castle and Umayabashi Castle.

Later, Kenshin besieged the Hōjō's main castle, Odawara Castle. The Uesugi breached the defenses, and burned the castle town. However, Kenshin would withdraw after two months. This came as the result of a lack of adequate supplies, and the reappearance of Takeda Shingen, Kenshin's long-time rival, who was threatening his territories.

== Aftermath ==
The Odawara castle itself however remained unconquered; this ended the first of three sieges of the Odawara castle.

== Sources ==
- Goldsmith, Brian (2008). Amassing Economies: The Medieval Origins of Early Modern Japan, 1450–1700. ISBN 9780549851158.
- Turnbull, Stephen (1998). The Samurai Sourcebook. London: Cassell & Co.
