= Yokota Takatoshi =

Japanese samurai (1487-1550)

- 横田 高松
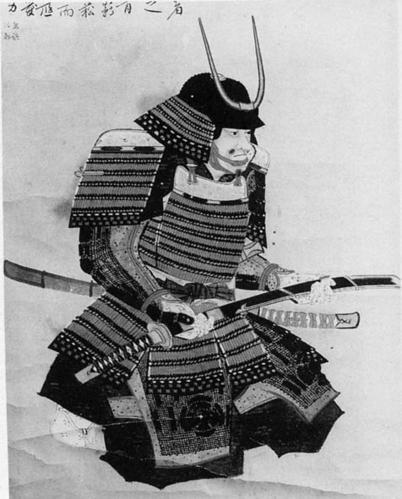
- Born: 1487
- Died: November 9, 1550 (aged 62–63); Toishi Castle, Shinano Province, Japan
- Military career
- Allegiance: Takeda clan
- Conflicts: Sieges of Toishi (1550)

Yokota Takatoshi (横田 高松; 1487 – November 9, 1550) was a Japanese samurai of the Sengoku period. He was known as one of the "Twenty-Four Generals of Takeda Shingen".

== Military life and Death ==
He was most known for his participation in Sieges of Toishi where he together with Sanada Yukitaka fight Murakami Yoshikiyo. he reportedly put a fervent strong drill to his Spear soldier during the sieges, ordered them to consecutively perform a certain maneuver on battlefield, as such if a single line were to be formed with a depth of three-ranks, they would level their spear tips while advancing. however, despite the success of the siege he was killed in the battle
