= Tsuchiya Masatsugu =

Japanese samurai warrior

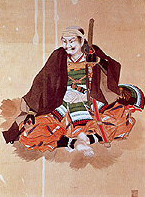
Tsuchiya Masatsugu

Tsuchiya Masatsugu (土屋昌次; 1544 – July 9, 1575) was a Japanese samurai warrior in the Sengoku period. he is known as one of the "Twenty-Four Generals of Takeda Shingen".

In 1573, he fought at Battle of Mikatagahara against Tokugawa Ieyasu. In 1575, he was killed at the Battle of Nagashino against Oda-Tokugawa forces. His sons followed Takeda Katsuyori until his death at Temmokuzan in 1582

== See also ==
- Tsuchiya clan
