= Itagaki Nobukata =

Japanese Samurai (1489–1548)

- 板垣 信方
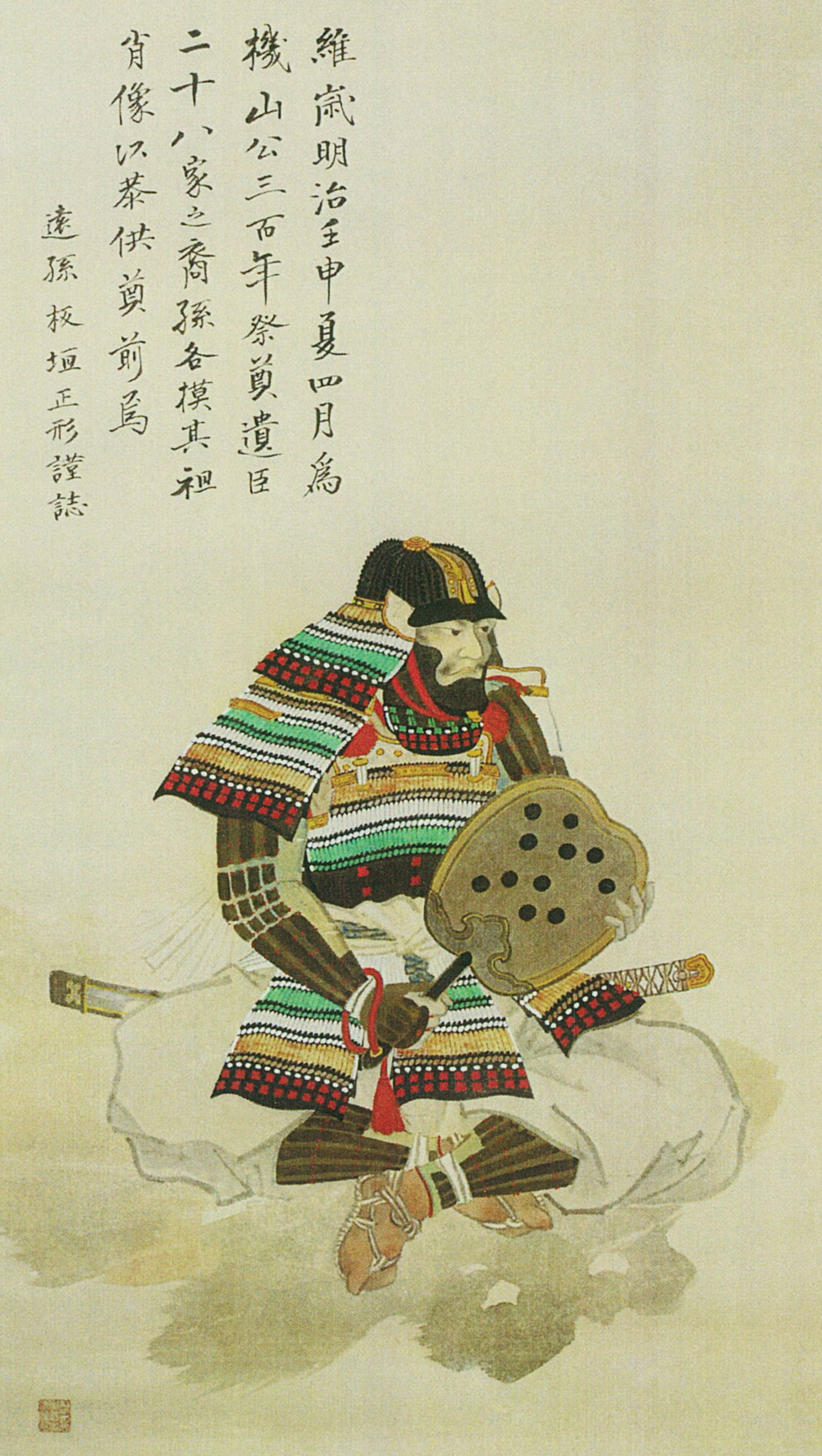
- Born: 1489
- Died: March 23, 1548 (aged 58–59)
- Relatives: Itagaki Taisuke
- Military career
- Allegiance: Takeda clan
- Nickname: 信形
- Conflicts: Battle of Ankokuji (1542); Battle of Odaihara (1547); Siege of Shika Castle (1547); Battle of Uedahara (1548)

Itagaki Nobukata (板垣 信方; 1489 – March 23, 1548) was a retainer of the Takeda family. He was known as one of the "Twenty-Four Generals of Takeda Shingen". His name is also seen with different kanji as 信形. Nobukata served under both Takeda Nobutora and Takeda Shingen and also was tasked with young Shingen.

== Military life ==
In 1541 Nobutora, along with Amari Torayasu, was driven out from the position of the head of Takeda clan, and he served as the general for Shingen often leading the troops into a battle when Shingen could not.

In 1542, he would personally finish off Takato Yoritsugu at Battle of Ankokuji, shortly after the Siege of Fukuyo.

In 1545, he successfully besieged and captured Takato castle.

In 1546, he defeated Uesugi Norimasa at Usui Toge in Battle of Odaihara. With these victories, he was instrumental in gaining the control of Shinano Province and proved himself a skilled tactician. He was known as one of the "Twenty-Four Generals of Takeda Shingen". After these victories, Nobukata increasingly became selfish and started to hold victory ceremonies without firmly winning a battle. These victories rapidly became fewer. As Nobukata was the eldest of the Takeda retainers and having educated Shingen, few could criticize his actions.

In 1547, during Siege of Shika Castle, Nobukata and his troops were almost completely wiped out in a battle and without a timely rescue by Hara Toratane, Nobukata himself would have been in danger as well. Shingen offered the following waka to Nobukata to encourage him to correct his act.

Dare mo Miyo Mitsureba Yagate Kaku Tsuki no Izayofu Ana ya Hito no Yo no Naka誰もみよ 満つればやがて 欠く月の 十六夜ふ穴や 人の世の中 (Translation) "Everyone sees that even a beautiful full moon starts to change its shape, becoming smaller as the time passes. Even in our human lives, things are as it is."

In 1548, at the Battle of Uedahara, Nobutaka satisfied with a victory, had his troops stand down to hold a ceremony. Murakami Yoshikiyo's troops regrouped and counterattacked, killing Nobutaka and Amari Torayasu.

== Personal life ==
The Meiji era politician Itagaki Taisuke was Nobukata's direct descendant, 12 generations removed.

== In fiction ==
In NHK's 2007 Taiga drama Fūrinkazan, Itagaki is played by Sonny Chiba. Like in the novel it was adapted from, Nobukata was portrayed more heroically, supposedly the one who was trying to rein in the young Takeda Harunobu (Shingen) from his arrogance and chose to sacrifice himself so that Harunobu may survive the Battle of Uedahara.

== Genealogy ==
∴
Takeda Nobuyoshi
Ichijo Tadayori	^{1}Itagaki Kanenobu	Henmi Ariyoshi	Takeda Nobumitsu
Itagaki Yoritoki	^{2}Itagakiyorishige
^{3}Itagaki Yorikane	Itagaki Nobuyori	Itagaki sanekane	Takeda Nagakane
^{4}Itagaki Yukiyori	Takeda Nobusada
^{5}Itagaki Nagayori	Nakamura Kanekuni
^{6}Itagaki Saburozaemon	Nakamura Kanesada
^{7}Itagaki Shiro
^{8}Itagaki saburo
^{9}Itagaki Shokei
^{10}Itagaki Kanemitsu
^{11}Itagaki Zenman-bo
^{12}Itagaki Bishu	^{13}Itagaki Nobuyasu
Itagaki Hokinokami	^{14}Itagaki Nobukata	Morozumi Genbanojo	woman
^{15①}Itagaki Nobunori	Sakayori Masamitsu	^{16}Itagaki Nobuyasu	wife of Itagaki Nobuyasu
^{②}Itagaki Masanobu	Itagaki Masatora	woman	^{17}Itagaki Surinosuke	Itagaki Hayato
^{③}Inui Masayuki	Itagaki Masayoshi	Sakayori Masayoshi
^{④}Inui Masasuke	^{1}Inui Masanao	Inui Tomomasa
^{⑤}Inui Masakata	Inui Jujiro	^{2}Inui Masafusa	Inui Muichi
Inui Kasuke	^{⑥}Inui Masakiyo	wife of Kondo Michikata	Inui Jusuke	^{3}Inui Yoshikatsu
^{⑦}Inui Naotake	Inui Naokowa	Nakayama Hidenobu	Inui Kowamasa	^{4}Inui Masafusa	Inui Masanaru
^{⑧}Inui Masa-akira	^{5}Inui Masahisa
^{⑨}Inui Nobutake	Nomoto Nobuteru	woman	^{6}Inui Masaharu	Motoyama Shigeyoshi
^{⑩}Inui Masashige	wife of Hirai Masazane	wife of Nagaya Hikodayu	Inui Masakatsu	^{7}Inui Masa-atsu	Inui Masa-atsu
^{⑪}Itagaki Taisuke	Inui Kyuba	wife of Hino Shigeyoshi	woman	woman	^{8}Inui Seishi
Itagaki Hokotaro	^{8}Inui Seishi	Itagaki Magozaburo	Itagaki Masami	Inui Muichi	Kataoka Hyoko	Miyaji Gunko	Ogawa Enko	Asano Chiyoko	Oyama Ryoko
Itagaki Takeo	^{⑫}Itagaki Morimasa	^{⑬}Itagaki Masatsura	Kawase Miyoshi	Nakamura Choshi	^{9}Inui Ichiro	Miyaji Shigeaki	Motoyama Nobuko	Asano Kazuharu	Asano Fusako	Oyama Tomomitsu
Ozaki Tadashi	Mishima Takuko	Itagaki Masa-aki	Akiyama Noriko	^{⑭}Itagaki Taitaro	Itagaki Naomaro	Kawase Katsuyo	Sugisaki Mitsuyo	Nakamura Junko	^{10}Takaoka Mariko	Oyama Tomokazu
Ozaki Kimimasa	Akiyama Takeo	Akiyama Takeshi	Akiyama Yuri	Itagaki Yuko	Itagaki Akihiro	Nakamura Naotaka	Nakamura Kazutaka	Ibuka Mika	Takaoka Koutaro	Oyama Tomoaki	Oyama Tomohide

Source "Kai Kokushi". Matsudaira Sadayoshi. 1814. Japan.(Aduchi-Momoyama period part) "Kwansei-choshu Shokafu". Hotta Masaatsu, Hayashi jyussai. 1799. Japan.(Aduchi-Momoyama period part) "Osamuraichu Senzogaki-keizucho"(Edo period part)
