= Battle of Uedahara =

1548 battle in Japan using firearms

- Part of the Sengoku period
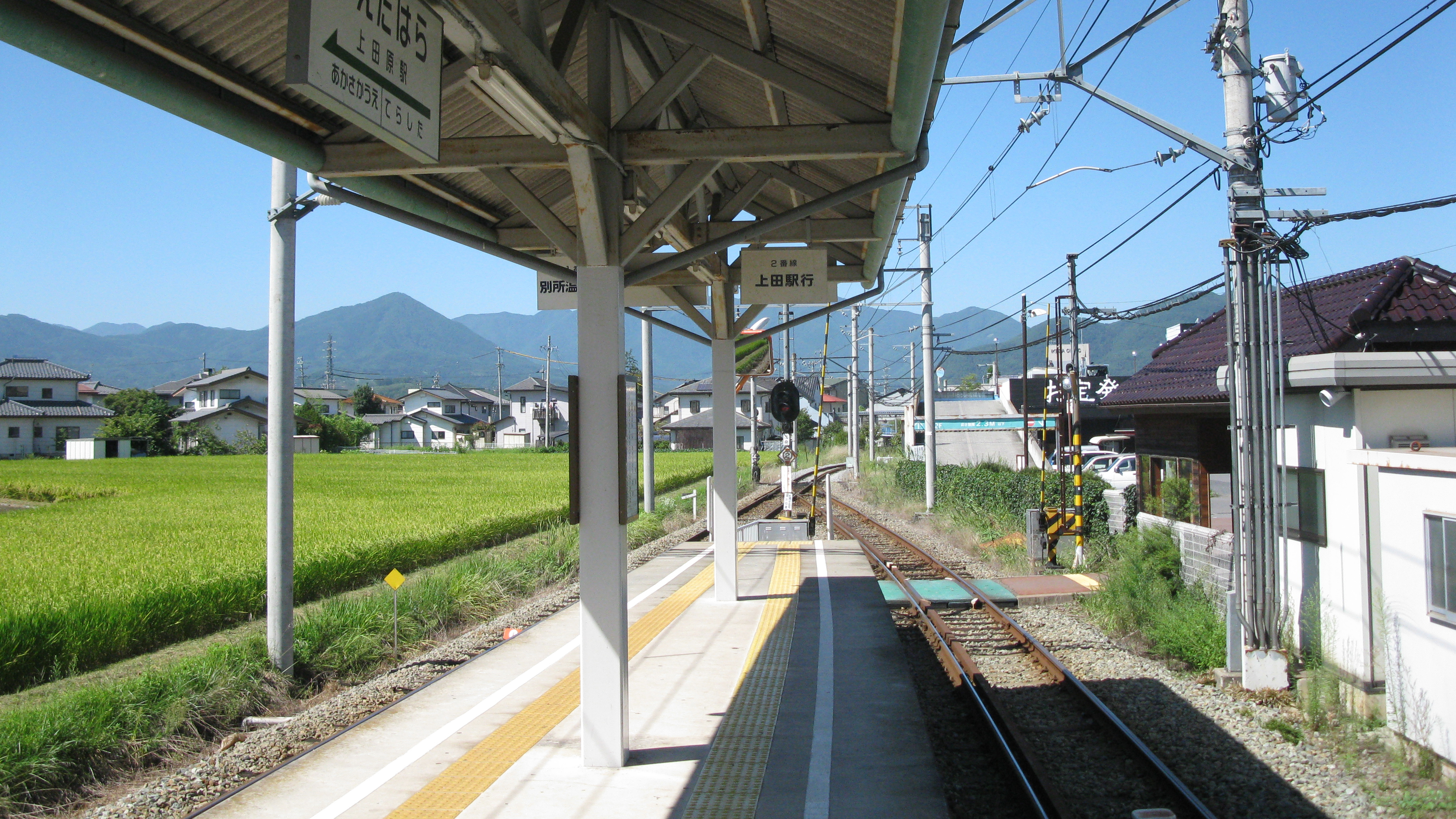
- Uedahara today
Date	February 14, 1548
Location	Uedahara, Shinano Province (now Ueda, Nagano Prefecture) 36°23′44″N 138°12′48″E
Result	Murakami victory

Belligerents
Takeda clan	Murakami clan

Commanders and leaders
Takeda Shingen; Itagaki Nobukata †; Amari Torayasu †; Hajikano Den'emon †	Murakami Yoshikiyo

Strength
7,000	3,000

Casualties and losses
700 men	120
- Location within Nagano Prefecture Battle of Uedahara (Japan)

The Battle of Uedahara (上田原の戦い) was the first defeat suffered by Takeda Shingen, and the first field battle in Japan in which firearms were used. It took place in Shinano Province or the modern-day Nagano Prefecture.

== Battle ==
The Battle of Uedahara was part of Shingen's attempt to control Shinano Province. Shingen's father had invaded the territory and the clan was already in control of the bulk of its southern region around Lake Suwa. Shingen's campaign began with the takeover of Shika castle, which alarmed Murakami Yoshikiyo due to its proximity to his territories. The latter sent an army tasked with aiding Shika but it was ambushed by Shingen's troops at Odaihara. Yoshikiyo began mobilizing his forces in March 1548 to capture Shiga and drive Shingen out of Shinano.

Takeda Shingen met up with his force that had taken Shika castle, and led 7000 men north to face the threat posed by Yoshikiyo. Shingen's vanguard was led by Itagaki Nobukata; when they charged head-on into Murakami's vanguard, the charge was absorbed, and Itagaki was killed.

Murakami made use of 50 ashigaru armed with Japanese "hand cannon" arquebuses, who were meant to serve as support for archers. The army also used short-barreled Chinese handguns to counter the enemy's cavalry. Shingen, on the other hand, adhered to the traditional battle strategy and failed to use the tanegashima first. Around 700 of Takeda's men were killed, including Itagaki, and two other generals, Amari Torayasu and Hajikano Den'emon. Shingen himself even suffered a spear wound to his left arm.

== Aftermath ==
Despite Murakami's victory, his power was significantly diminished after the Battle of Uedahara. This was attributed to the death of his top-ranking samurai, crippling his capability to stand up on his own. On the other hand, Shingen benefited from the conflict, expanding his power further as he gained the Kousaka, Inoue, Mennai, Suda, Takanashi, and Seba districts.
