= Sieges of Toishi =

1550 siege

- Part of Sengoku period
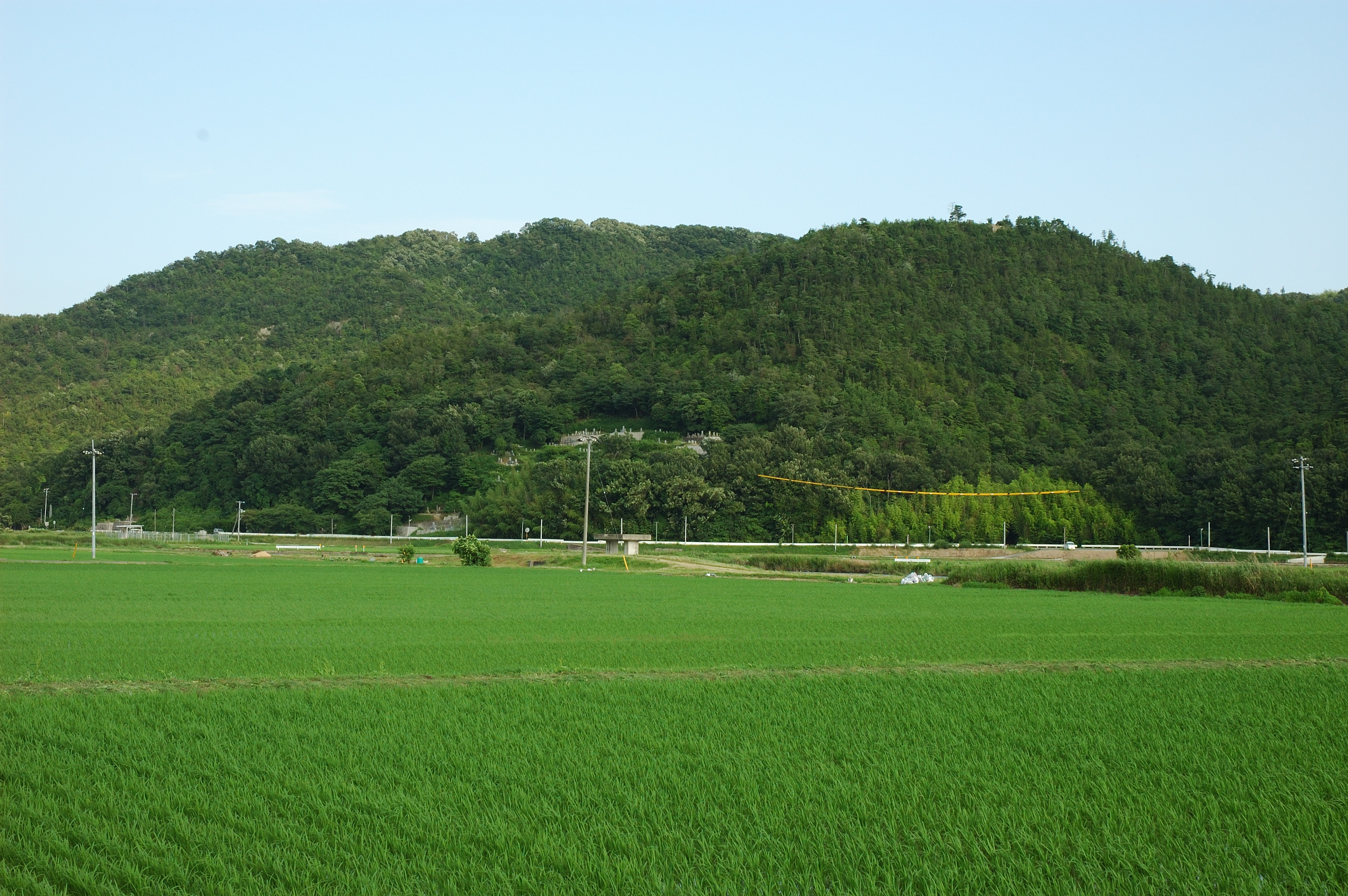
- Toishi Castle
Date	1550–1551
Location	Toishi Castle, Shinano Province, Japan 36°25′28″N 138°17′29″E
Result	Takeda victory
Territorial changes	Takeda Shingen takes Toishi

Belligerents
Takeda clan	Murakami clan

Commanders and leaders
Sanada Yukitaka; Yokota Takatoshi †	Murakami Yoshikiyo

Strength
4,000	3,000

Casualties and losses
Unknown	1,000+ killed
- Location within Nagano Prefecture Sieges of Toishi (Japan)

The sieges of Toishi castle (砥石崩れ, Toishi kuzure; "Rout of Toishi") took place during Takeda Shingen's campaign to take over Shinano Province. His army, led by Sanada Yukitaka, began besieging the castle in 1550. The defending lord, Murakami Yoshikiyo, held out until the following year, but his garrison suffered over 1,000 casualties, and was ultimately forced to surrender.

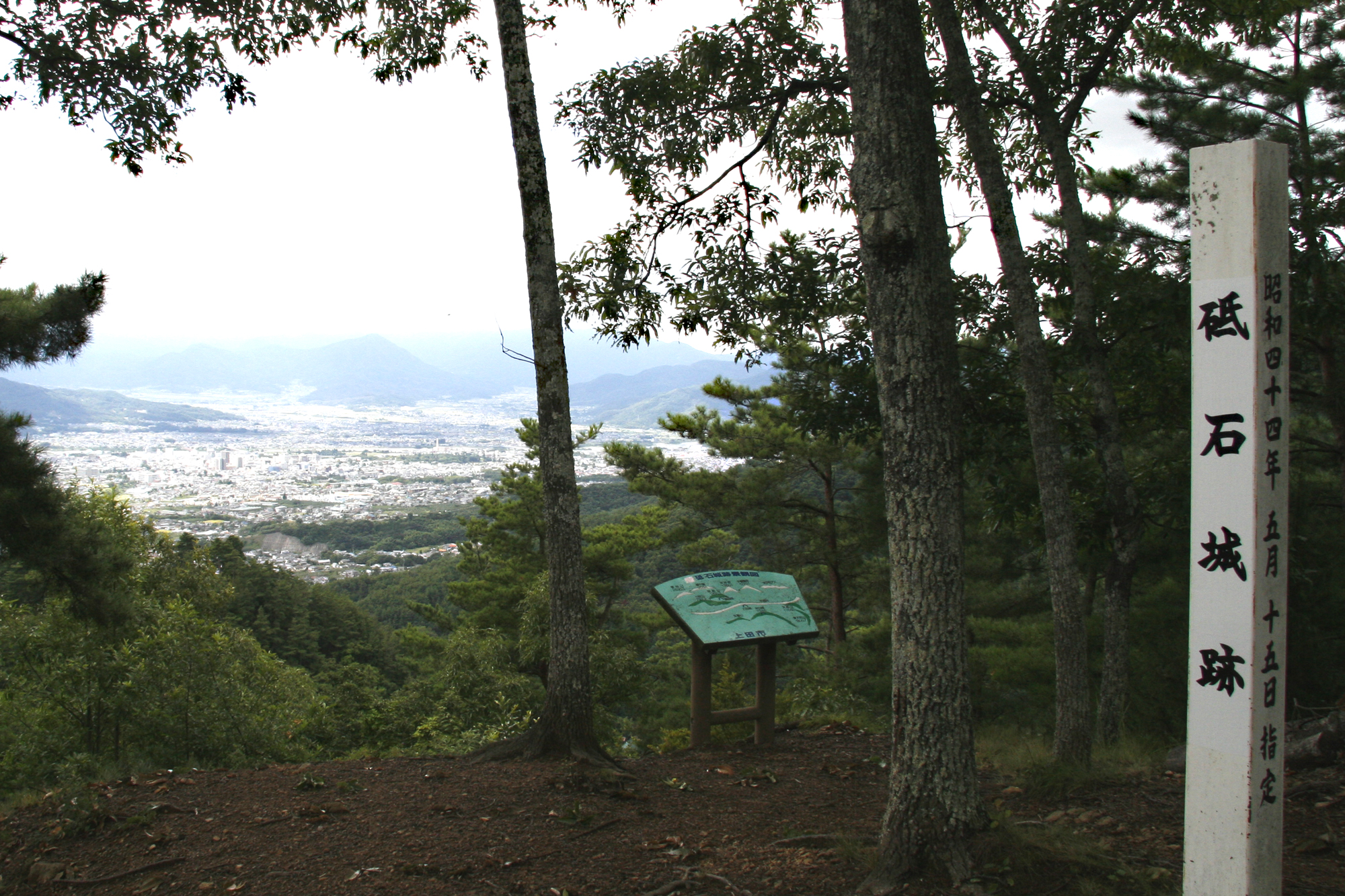
Toishi Castle
