= Baba Nobuharu =

Japanese samurai

- 馬場 信春
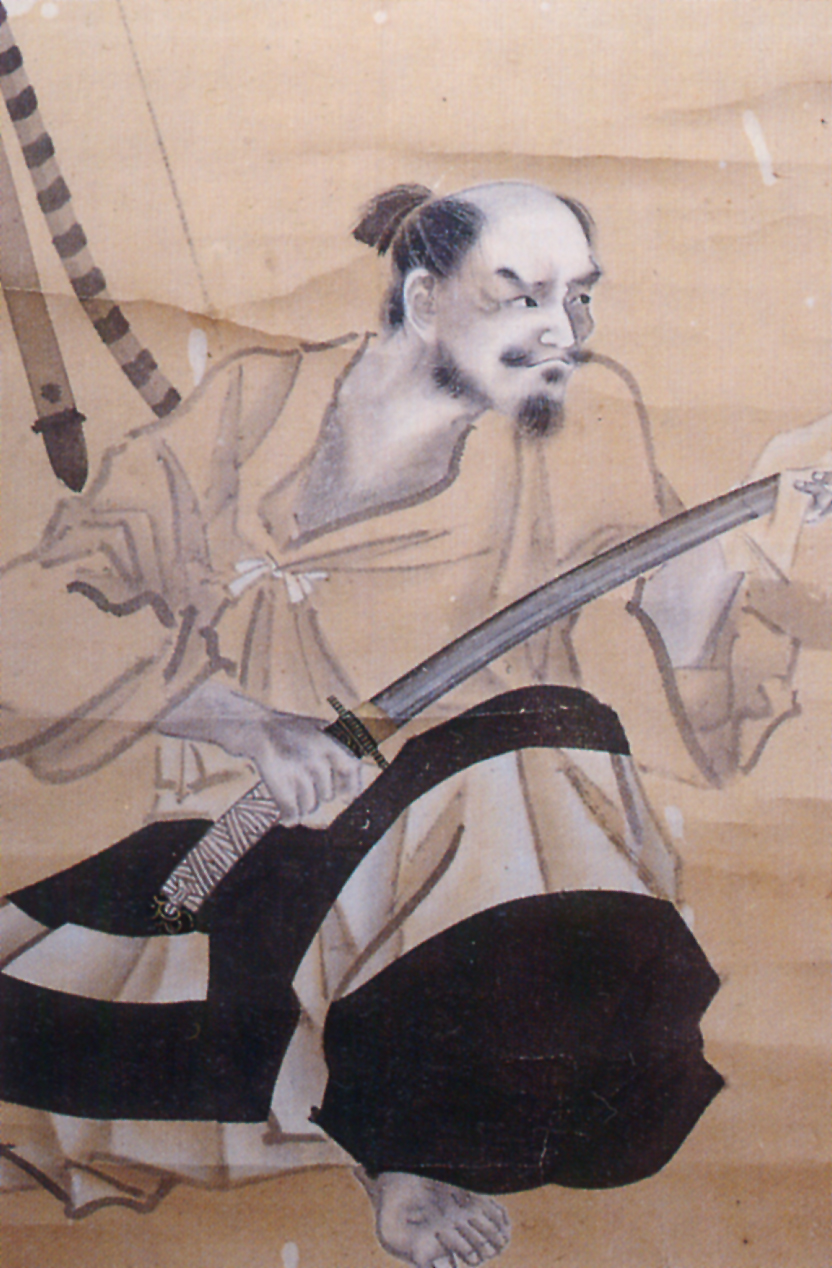
- Born: 1514/15
- Died: June 29, 1575
- Military career
- Allegiance: Takeda clan
- Nickname: Baba Nobufusa (馬場 信房)
- Conflicts: Siege of Katsurayama (1557); Siege of Iwamura Castle (1572); Battle of Mikatagahara (1573); Battle of Nagashino (1575)

Baba Nobuharu (馬場 信春; 1514/15 – June 29, 1575), also known as Baba Nobufusa (馬場 信房), was a Japanese samurai of the Sengoku period. He was known as one of the "Twenty-Four Generals of Takeda Shingen". When Takeda Shingen took Fukashi castle (now Matsumoto Castle) in 1550, he entrusted it to Baba.

According to records, he was in charge of the Suwa area in Shinano from around 1553. This was a border area with the northern Daimyo, and was a defensive base to monitor invasions from the north. He was also an intermediary for the Shiina family of Etchu.

== Military life ==
In 1557, Baba fought in the Kawanakajima campaigns, and led the Takeda army that besieged and destroyed Katsurayama, a major Uesugi clan stronghold.

In 1562, he was allowed to take the name of "Mino no Kami", the guardian of Mino, in honor of Hara Toratane, a former "Mino no Kami" who had retired the previous year, and changed his name to Baba Mino no Kami Nobuharu. The Kōyō Gunkan states that Shingen often consulted Nobuharu on important matters.

In 1572, he took part in the Siege of Iwamura Castle against Oda clan garrison.

In 1573, he took part in the Battle of Mikatagahara, during which the troops under his command chased Tokugawa Ieyasu's army back to Hamamatsu fortress; upon seeing the gates open and braziers lit, Baba mistakenly suspected a trap, and did not press the fleeing army further. Following Takeda Shingen's death, Baba served his successor Takeda Katsuyori.

In 1575, knowing Nobunaga's participation in the Battle of Nagashino, he advised Katsuyori to withdraw but Katsuyori rejected the idea. He led the Takeda army's right-wing, and was killed in combat during that engagement. It is said that he served to cover the retreat, enabling Katsuyori to escape the battlefield. The deaths of Baba Nobuharu, Sanada Nobutsuna, Naito Masayo, Yamagata Masakage, and other brave warriors of Shingen's reign in the Battle of Nagashino led to the weakening of the Takeda family and its destruction in 1582. Prior to Nagashino, Nobuharu was reputed to have fought in 70 battles without receiving a single wound. For this reason, he is known today as "Baba Mino the Immortal" or "Oni Mino the Immortal".
