= Murakami Yoshikiyo =

Japanese samurai

Murakami Yoshikiyo

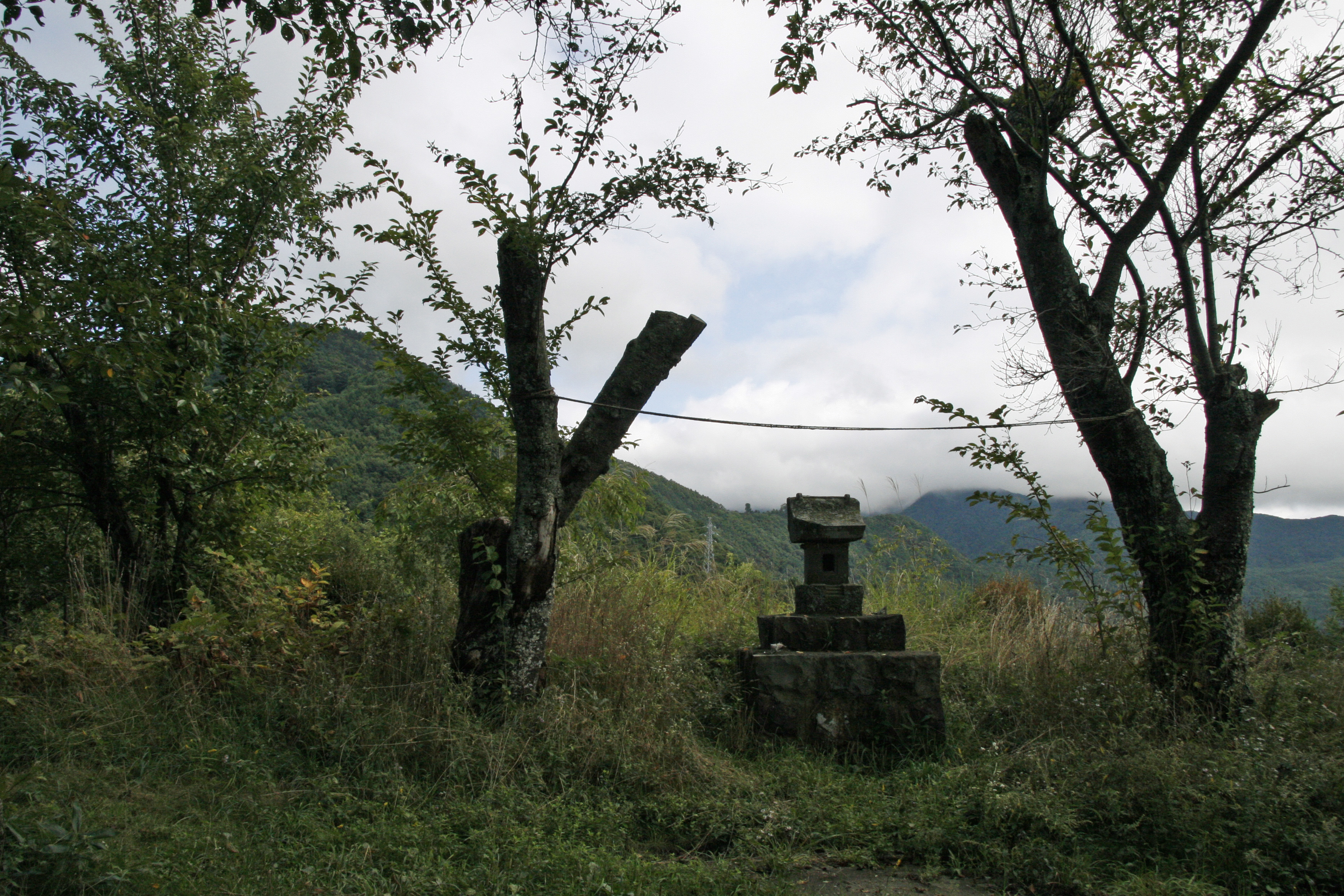
Yoshikiyo's Katsurao Castle

Murakami Yoshikiyo (村上 義清; 1501–1573) was a Japanese samurai from the Murakami clan and retainer of the Uesugi clan during the Sengoku period of the 16th century. Yoshikiyo followed in fighting against both Takeda Nobutora and his son Takeda Shingen. Yoshikiyo was also a very close ally under Uesugi Kenshin and one of Shingen's bitterest opponents for his high kill-counts in their conflicts.

Before Murakami came into conflict with Takeda, they had good diplomatic relations as Yoshikiyo had sent back Oi Sadataka, a common enemy of both Murakami and Takeda when he was captured in Murakami's domain back to Takeda's base city of Kōfu as a prisoner for execution.

In 1542, Murakami joined a coalition with Ogasawara Nagatoki, Suwa Yorishige, and Kiso Yoshiyasu to oppose Takeda Shingen's growing forces. The two sides met at the Battle of Sezawa, with the coalition suffering a defeat in the battle.

In 1546, when Shingen and the Takeda forces arrived to attack Toishi Castle. Yoshikiyo came to the rescue commanding 6000 soldiers, crushing Shingen's spearhead and claiming the life of some commanders such as Amari Bizen and Yokota Bitchū. He suffered defeat after some of Takeda's more brilliant strategists, Yamamoto Kansuke, Sanada Yukitaka and his son Sanada Masayuki join the fray and each score their brilliant strategems to ensure Harunobu's series of victories; however, in 1547 Yoshikiyo settled the score with Shingen, who had just enjoyed victory for seizing Shiga castle. Yoshikiyo caught him off guard and attacked him with entire force and routed him. One year later in 1548 he provided more severe defeats for Takeda by killing three of Shingen's generals Itagaki Nobukata, Amari Torayasu, and Hajikano Den'emon in Battle of Uedahara in similar full-scale counterattack as before and causing Shingen to retreat into Kai after losing 700 men

In 1550 he held Toishi Castle for one year against Sanada Yukitaka and suffered a loss but not before inflicting a loss with the death one of Takeda's general, Yokota Takatoshi. Then in 1553, Katsurao happened and Yoshikiyo lost Katsurao Castle.

In 1553 he was forced to abandon Shinano after losing to Takeda in Siege of Kannomine and forced to seek aid to Kenshin and serve as his retainer. Murakami was granted Nechi castle in Echigo for his service at the Battles of Kawanakajima as center division commander of the Uesugi army.

One source says at the fourth battle of Kawanakajima he had killed Takeda Nobushige, Shingen's brother and one of his most important generals and strategists although another source was saying it was Kenshin himself who personally slew Nobushige

He was never able to restore his old territory and died in Echigo in 1573, and his son Murakami Kunikiyo (Yamaura Kagekuni) became retainer of Uesugi.

== See also ==
- Uesugi clan
- Nagano Narimasa
