= Hara Toratane =

Japanese samurai

Hora Toratane

Hara Toratane (原 虎胤; 1497 – 1564) was a Japanese samurai lord of the Sengoku period. He is known as one of the "Twenty-Four Generals of Takeda Shingen". He once became a vassal of the Later Hojo clan, but returned to Kai and became a vassal of Takeda Shingen.
