= Yamamoto Kansuke (general) =

Samurai of the Sengoku period (1501–1561)

- 山本勘助
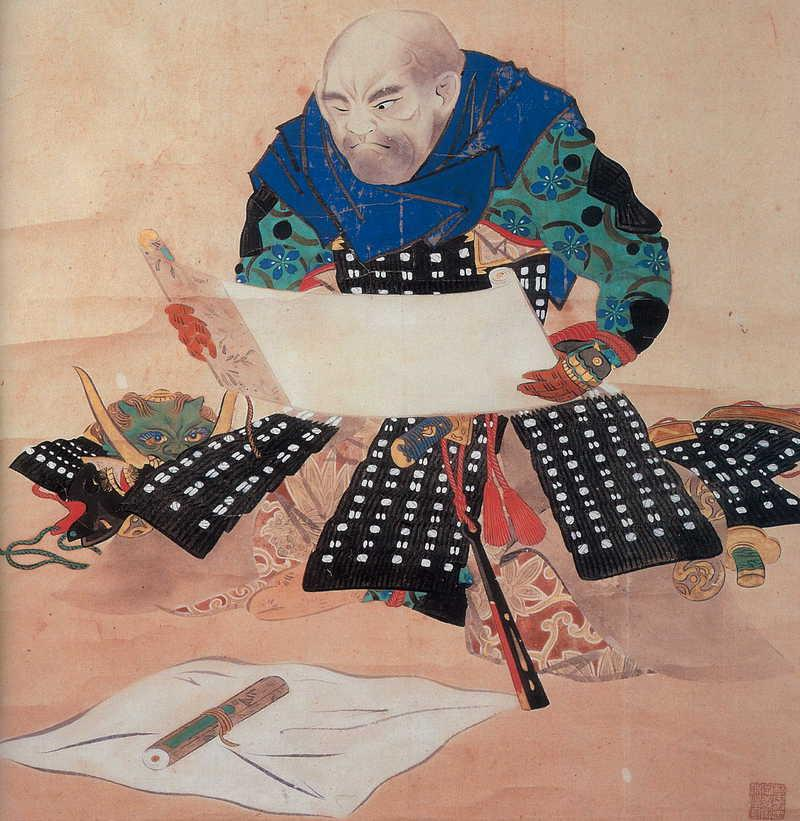
- Born: 1501; Ushikubo, Mikawa Province, Japan
- Died: October 18, 1561 (aged 59–60); Shinano Province, Japan
- Military career
- Allegiance: Takeda clan
- Rank: Strategist
- Conflicts: Shinano Campaign (1543-1557); Battles of Kawanakajima (1561)

Yamamoto Kansuke (山本 勘助; 1501 – October 18, 1561) was a Japanese samurai of the Sengoku period. He was known as one of the "Twenty-Four Generals of Takeda Shingen". Also known by his formal name, Haruyuki (晴幸). He was a brilliant strategist, and is particularly known for his plan which led to success in the fourth battle of Kawanakajima against Uesugi Kenshin. However, Kansuke never lived to see his plan succeed; thinking it to have failed, he charged headlong into the enemy ranks, dying in battle.

== Biography ==
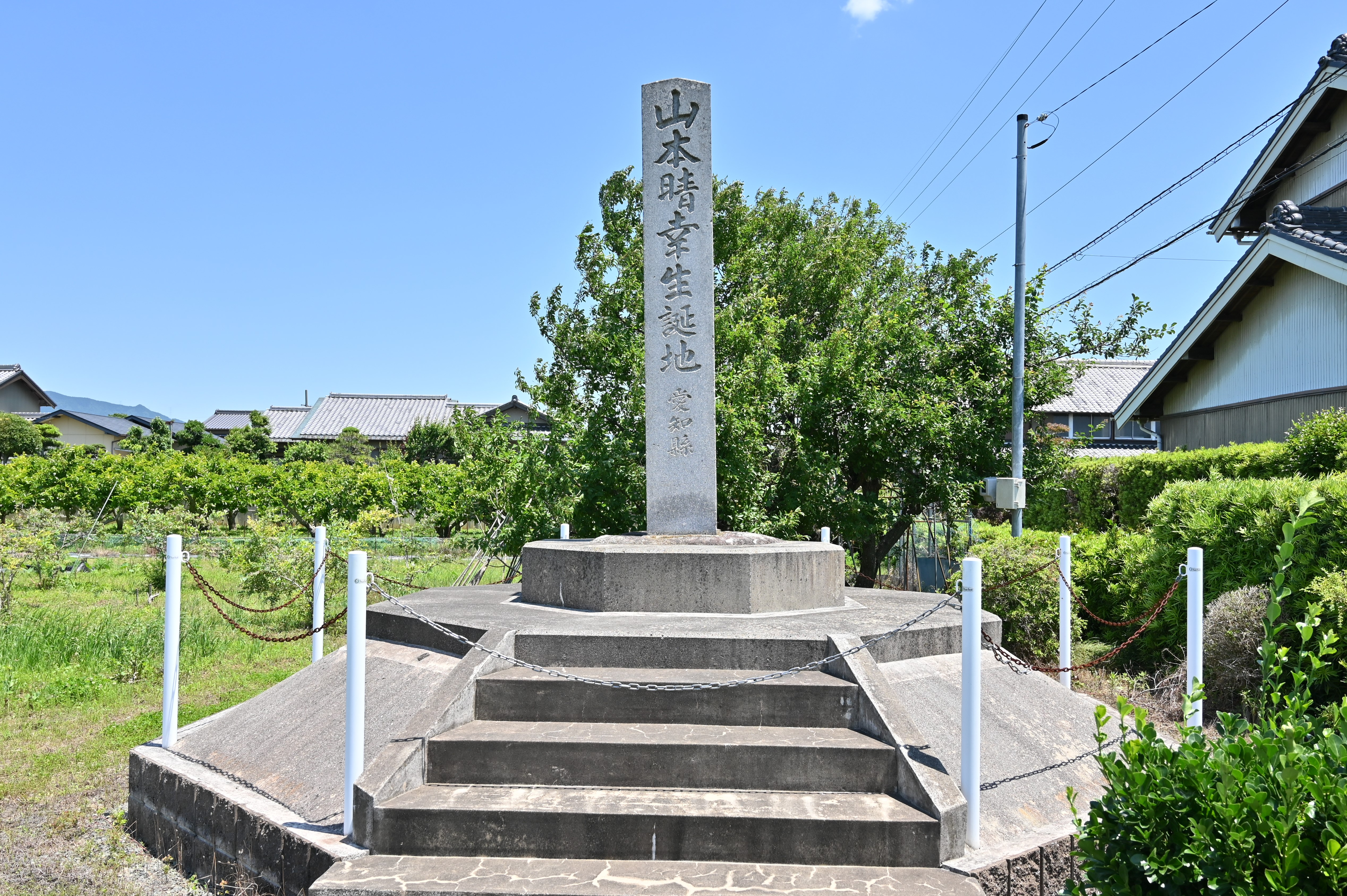
Yamamoto Kansuke's birthplace monument (Toyohashi City, Aichi Prefecture)

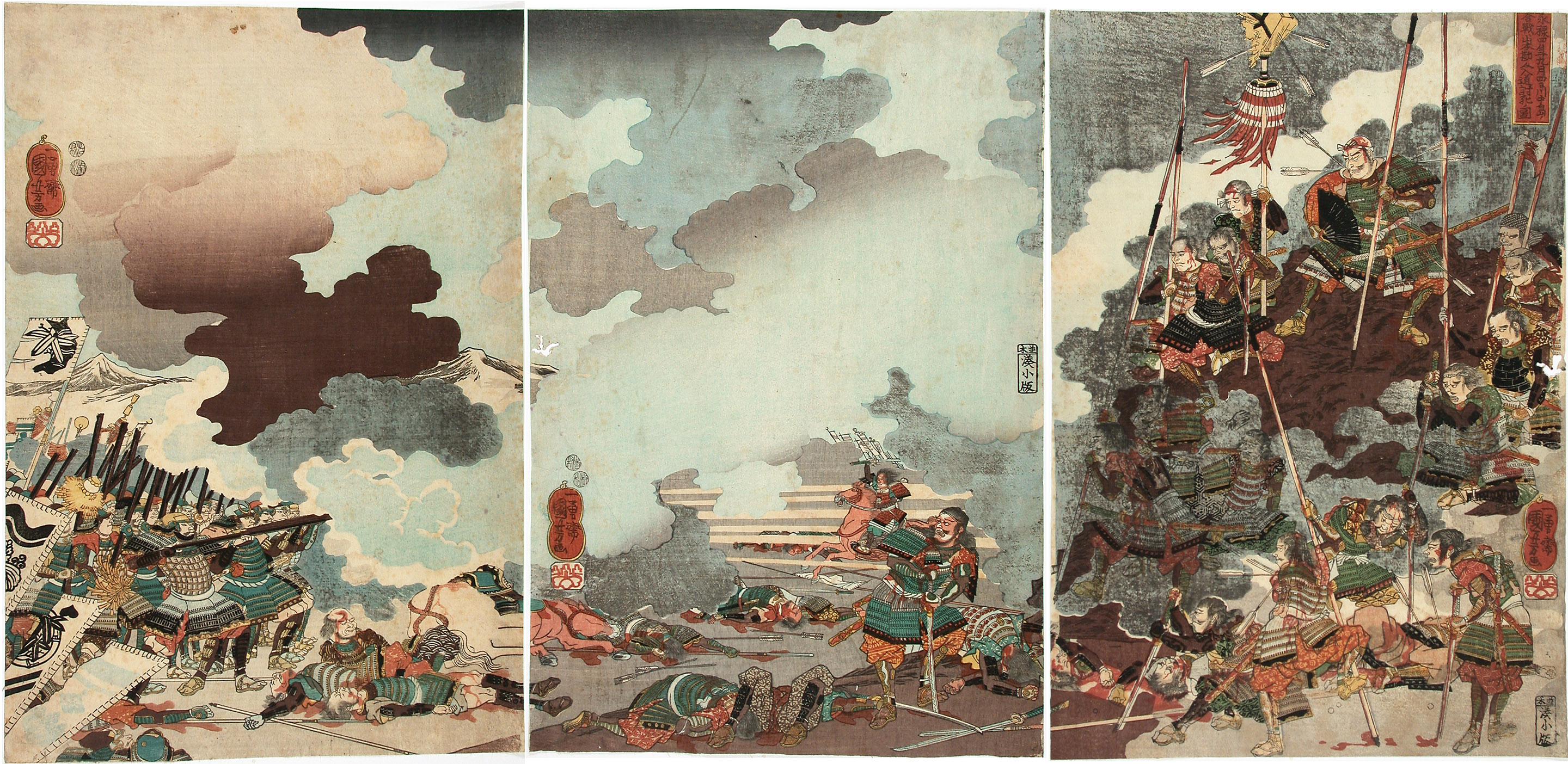
The death of Yamamoto Kansuke. Believing his strategy had failed, Kansuke charged the enemy and died fighting.

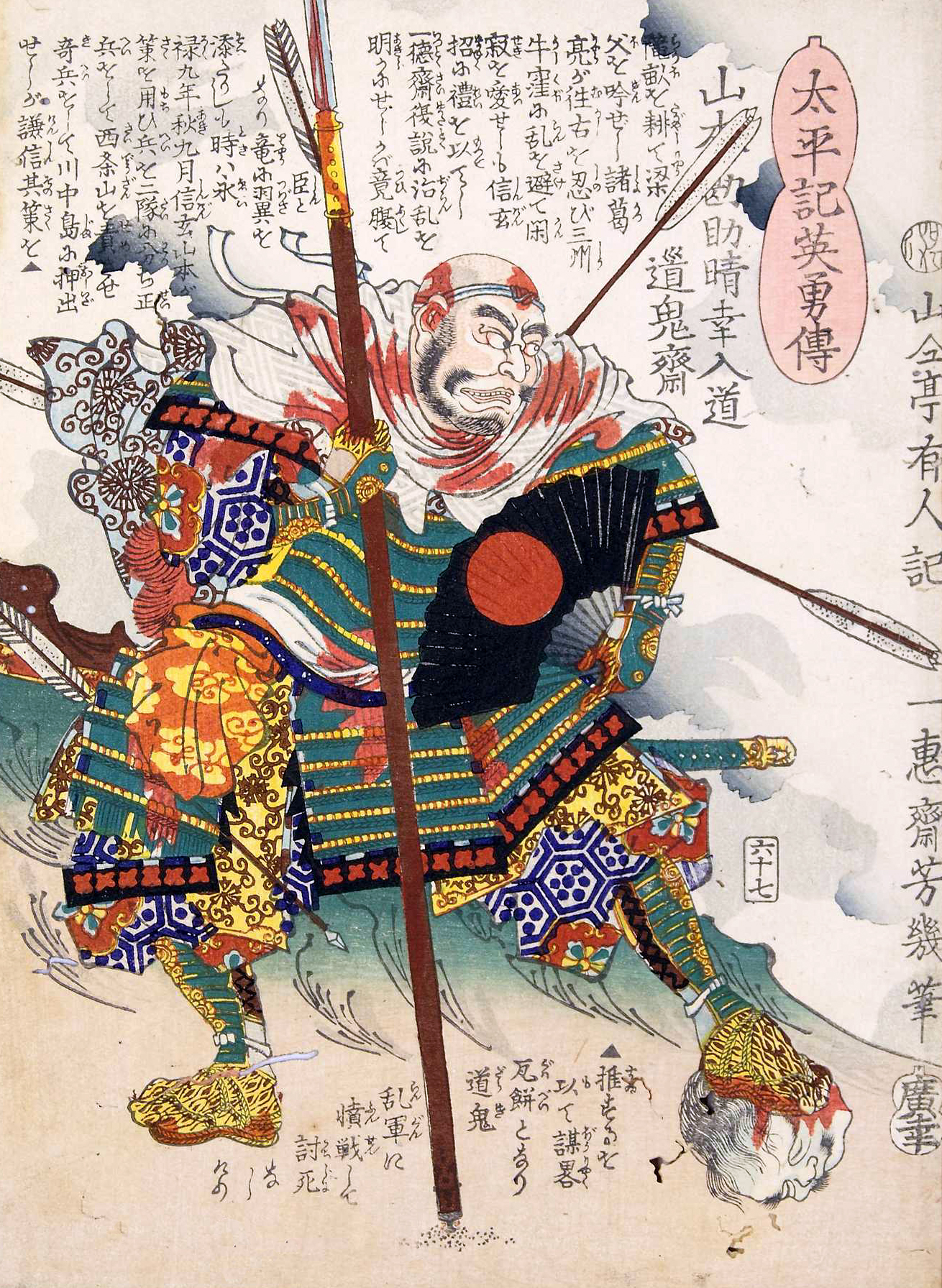
Taihei-Kin Yuden Sixty-Seven "Yamamoto Kansuke Haruyuki" (Utagawa Yoshiiku)

Kansuke's origins are not known for certain, but he is believed to have originated from Ushikubo, a town in Mikawa Province, which was then under the suzerainty of the Imagawa clan. He came to Kai and began to serve Takeda Shingen in 1543, receiving a position as an infantry commander (ashigaru-taishō 足軽大将). Legend says that Kansuke was blind in one eye and lame, but a fierce warrior and military strategist nevertheless. In various works of art, he is depicted holding a naginata as a support for his weak leg. Kansuke was also involved in bringing the defeated Suwa Yorishige's daughter to Shingen as a concubine.

He led the Pincer movement at the fourth Battle of Kawanakajima, but as he believed it to be a failure, he charged into the enemy ranks, being killed in action with his two chief retainers, Osaragi Shōzaemon (大仏庄左衛門) and Isahaya Sagorō (諫早佐五郎). Kansuke's adopted son Yamamoto Kanzō Nobutomo, was killed at the Battle of Kawanakajima.

Kansuke was an ancestor of Yamamoto Yaeko of Aizu, a famed Bakumatsu period woman warrior.

The Heihō Ōgisho (兵法奥義書), a treatise on strategy and tactics attributed to Kansuke, is included in the Takeda family chronicle, the Kōyō Gunkan. In it, he focuses particularly on the strategic behavior of individual warriors.

== In popular culture ==
For more information on Yamamoto Kansuke, see People of the Sengoku period in popular culture.

- Yamamoto Kansuke was the subject of the 1969 film Samurai Banners, directed by Hiroshi Inagaki, where the role of Kansuke was famously played by Toshiro Mifune.
- The 2007 NHK Taiga drama Fūrinkazan (風林火山) features Yamamoto Kansuke as the main character (played by Uchino Masaaki). It is based on the novel by Yasushi Inoue.
- Kansuke also appears in the Yoshihiro Takahashi's manga Kacchu no Senshi Gamu.
- He is also featured as one of the generals in the strategy game Civilization IV: Warlords.
- Kansuke appears as a minor character in the social romance sim Samurai Love Ballad (天下統一恋の乱 Love Ballad) produced by Voltage (company).
- A statue of Kansuke appears in the Sony Spider-Man Videogame.
- He is depicted as an evil sorcerer in the anime Isekai wa Sumātofon to Tomo ni.
- Yamamoto Kansuke also appeared in the manga Nise No Chigiri as well as its otome game under the name 'Doukisai'.

== Gallery ==
Yamamoto Kansuke

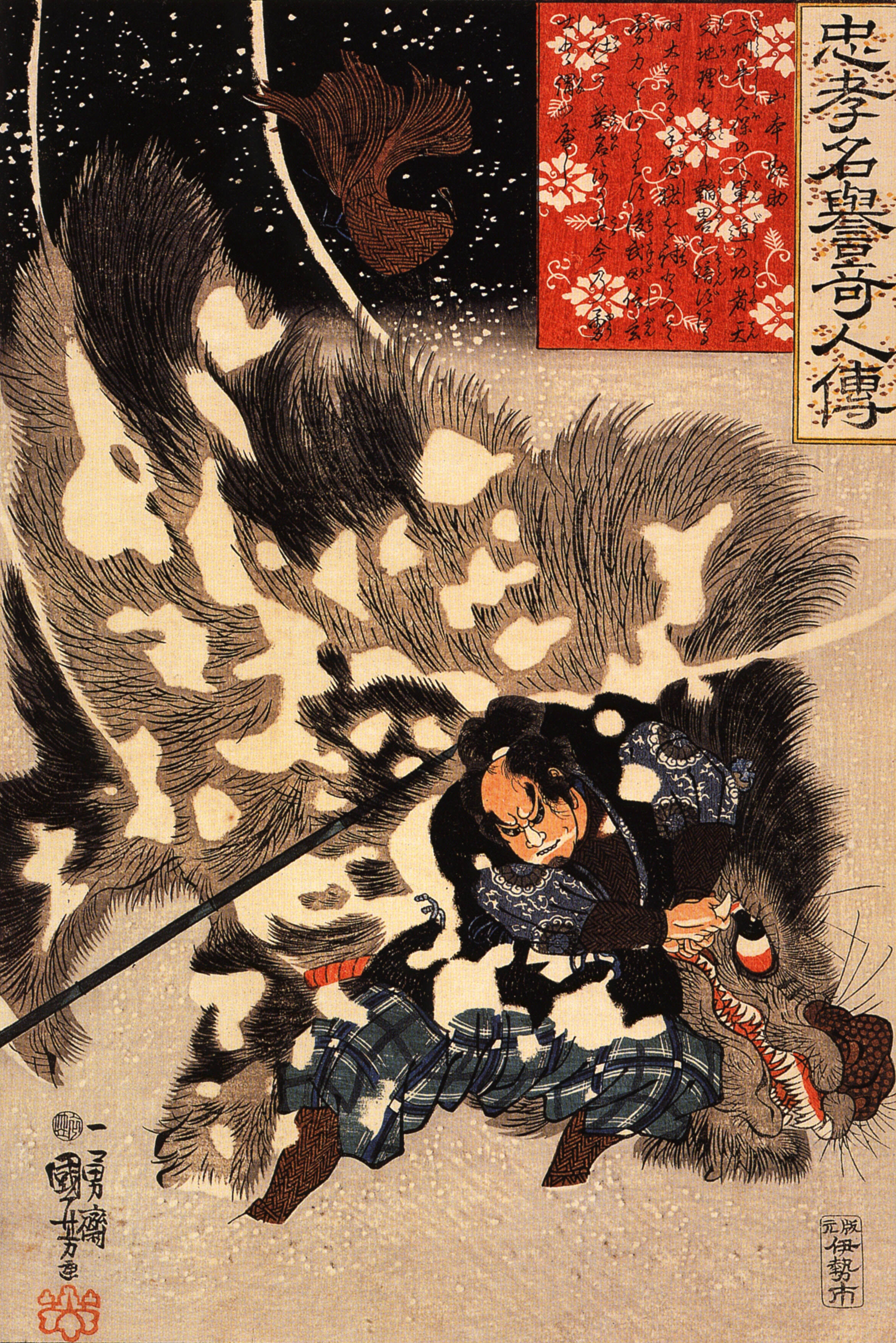
Yamamoto Kansuke fighting a giant boar, in a woodblock print by Utagawa Kuniyoshi

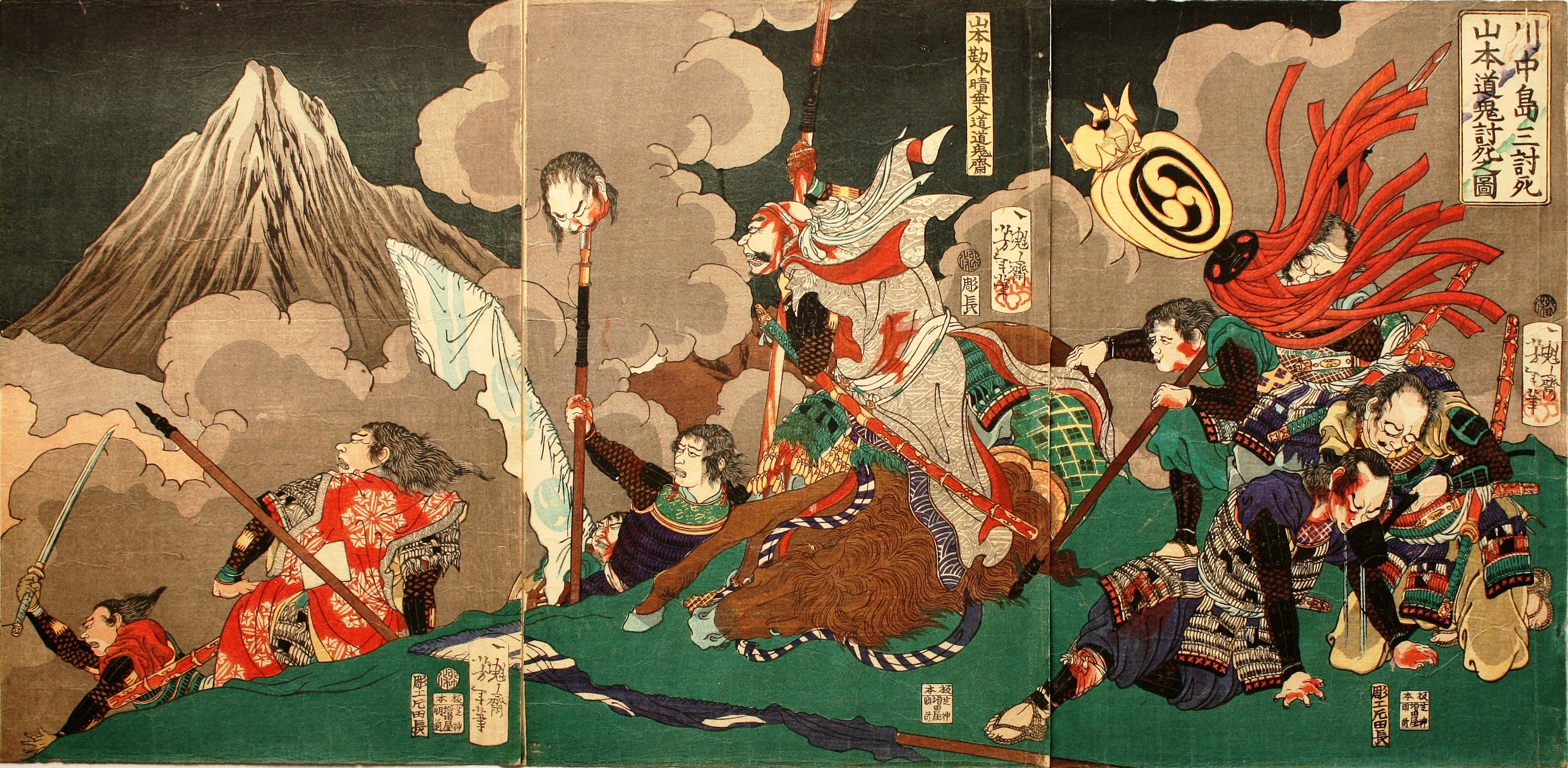
Kanesuke Yamamoto dies in the battle of Kawanakajima (Yoshitoshi)

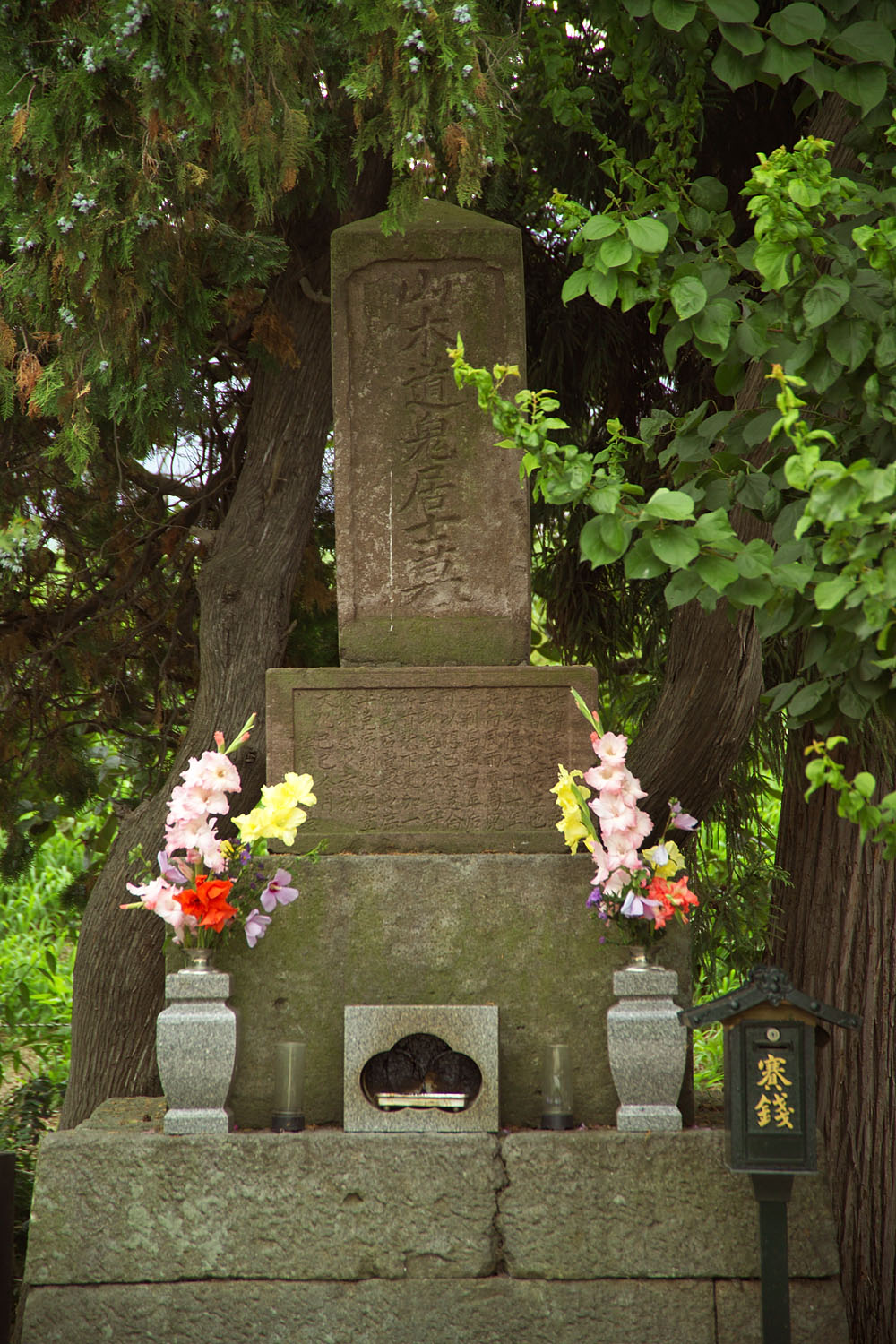
Grave of Kansuke, near site of Battle of Kawanakajima, Nagano
