= Uesugi Norimasa =

Daimyō of feudal Japan

- 上杉 憲政
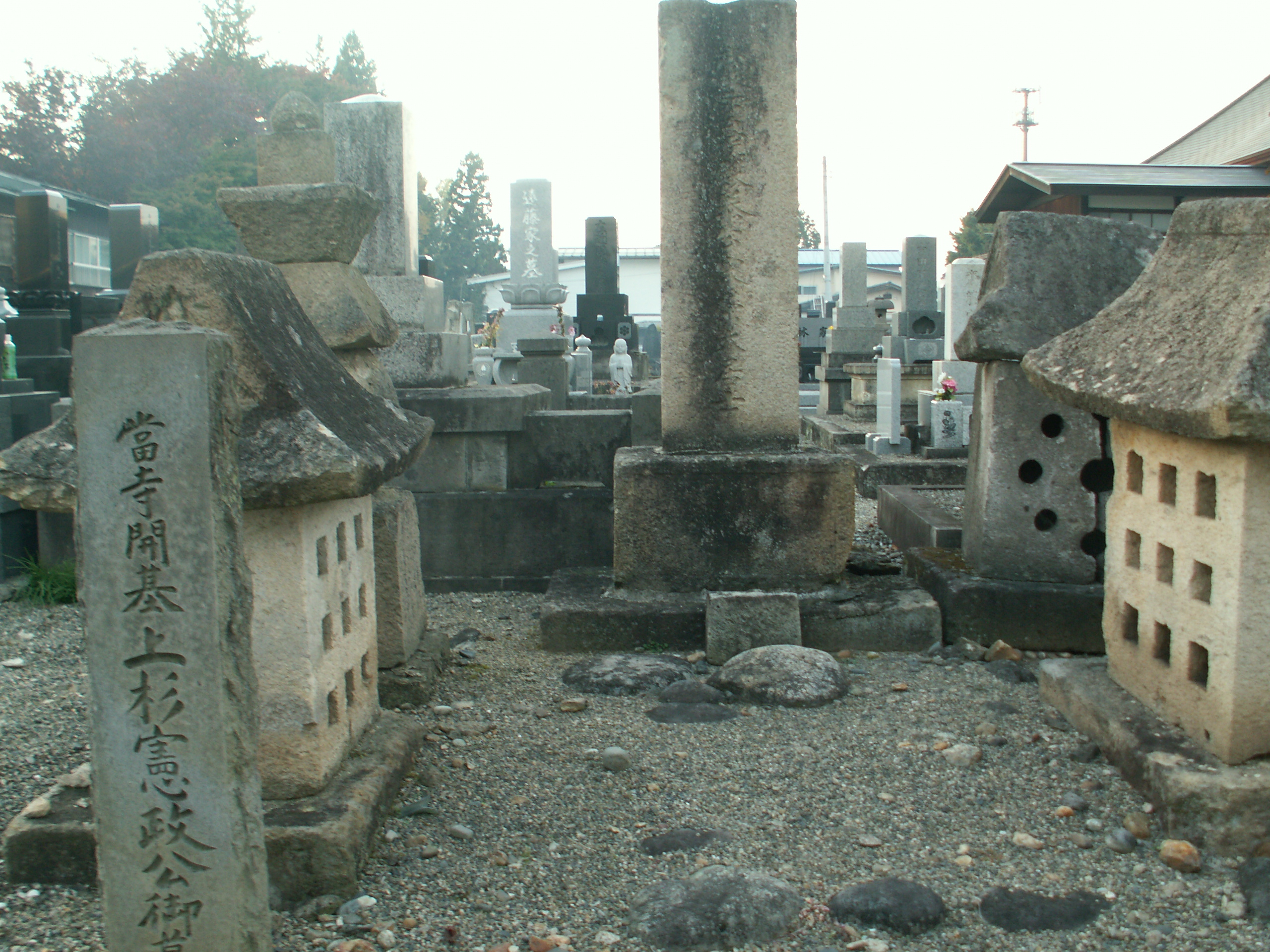
- Grave of Uesugi Norimasa

Head of Yamanaouchi Uesugi clan
- In office 1531–1561
- Preceded by: Uesugi Norihiro
- Succeeded by: Uesugi Kenshin

Personal details
- Born: 1523
- Died: April 13, 1579 (aged 55–56)
- Children: Uesugi Kenshin (adoptive son)
- Parent: Uesugi Norifusa (father)
- Relatives: Uesugi Norihiro (adopted brother)

Military service
- Allegiance: Yamanouchi Uesugi clan
- Rank: Kanrei, Daimyo
- Battles/wars: Battle of Kawagoe (1545); Battle of Odaihara (1547); Siege of Hirai Castle (1551); Siege of Odawara (1561); Siege of Otate (1579)

Uesugi Norimasa (上杉 憲政; 1523 – April 13, 1579) was a daimyō of feudal Japan from Yamanouchi branch Uesugi clan and held the post of Kantō Kanrei, the shōgun's deputy in the Kantō region. He was the adoptive father of Uesugi Kenshin, one of the most famous warlords in Japanese history.

== Biography ==
Norimasa is son of Uesugi Norifusa, he was only three years old when his father died. His adopted brother, Uesugi Norihiro, succeeded his father as head of the clan. When his brother was banished in 1531, Norimasa inherited the title of Kantō Kanrei.

In 1545, at the battle of Kawagoe, Ōgigayatsu and Yamanouchi major branches of the Uesugi family were defeated by Hōjō Ujiyasu of the Hōjō clan.

In 1547, he was defeated again in the Battle of Odaihara, this time by Takeda Shingen. Norimasa's campaigns only continued to be less and less successful.

In 1551, he was defeated once again at Siege of Hirai castle by Hōjō Ujiyasu, and fled to Echigo Province, where he sought asylum with his vassal Nagao Kagetora.

In 1552, Kagetora agreed to grant his lord shelter and protection, but only under certain conditions. Norimasa was forced to name Kagetora his heir, and to grant him the titles of Lord of Echigo and Kantō Kanrei.

In 1559, Norimasa was pushed Uesugi Kenshin to take control of the Kantō back from the Hōjō, and in 1560 Kenshin was able to comply. Heading a campaign against Hōjō Ujiyasu from fall 1560 to the summer of 1561, Kenshin was successful in taking a number of castles from the Hojo clan, like Numata Castle and Umayabashi Castle, which ended with the first siege of Odawara Castle in Sagami Province.

In 1561, Uesugi Norimasa, passed on the Uesugi clan to Nagao Kagetora, who was gaining power as the Governor of Echigo and succeeding as head of the Yamanouchi-Uesugi family and assuming the position of Kanto Kanrei. Kagetora then changed his name to Uesugi Terutora, to reflect his inheritance of Norimasa's lineage; he took the given name Terutora for a short time before choosing to be called Uesugi Kenshin.

In 1579, Norimasa died at the hands of Uesugi Kagekatsu's troops along with Uesugi Kagetora's oldest son, Doumanmaru, during the Otate power struggle.
