= Sixteen Divine Generals of Tokugawa =

Group of Sengoku-period generals

The Sixteen Divine Generals of Tokugawa (徳川十六神将, Tokugawa jūrokushinshō) were a group of 16 military commanders and daimyo who served Tokugawa Ieyasu and contributed to the founding of the Edo shogunate. They were credited with the greatest contributions to the establishment of the government. While the group is documented to consist of the Four Heavenly Kings of Tokugawa (徳川四天王, Tokugawa shitennō) and twelve other commanders and warlords, several varying groups have been documented, each with a different composition of individuals (excluding the Four Heavenly Kings, whose presence is consistent). During the Edo period, portraits and iconography depicting Ieyasu and the Sixteen Divine Generals were displayed at Tōshō-gū shrines.

== Background ==
In Japan, group portraits were often created modelled after Buddhist ensembles to honour daimyo families of the Sengoku period.

The reason for choosing the number sixteen is not certain, but it was assumed to have been chosen due to its significance in Buddhism, as it is seen in other Buddhist groupings such as the Sixteen Arhats and the Solosmasthana. The four leading figures — Sakai Tadatsugu, Honda Tadakatsu, Sakakibara Yasumasa, and Ii Naomasa — are particularly venerated in a higher status as the Four Heavenly Kings of Tokugawa. It is believed that the combined figures of the Four Heavenly Kings and the Twelve Heavenly Generals in Buddhist belief led to the establishment of this group. However, there also exists a larger grouping known as the Twenty-Eight Generals, which features an additional dozen generals, all of whom have also been portrayed together. Ieyasu, who was posthumously deified as the Tōshō Daigongen, was regarded as a Gongen, a reincarnation of the Buddha.

While the criteria for selection were not ascertained, it was believed that the men were powerful retainers of Ieyasu who distinguished themselves on the battlefield during periods of territorial expansion. It was therefore believed that their images were chosen to serve as reminders of the hardships and achievements of the founding figures of the regime for the future generations, as peace would begin to prevail in the region and administrative positions would gain prominence over military ones.

However, this theory has been criticised by historian Hiroyuki Kikuchi for several reasons. One reason is that the group contains a mixture of highly influential retainers and allegedly obscure persons. Another is that no other clans from this period appear to have honoured their military commanders in such a manner. He then concluded that the concept of the Sixteen Divine Generals was devised by Watanabe Moritsuna, who had sought to honour his friend Torii Tadahiro, who had died in battle. Kikuchi asserted that in the process of doing so, he included lesser-known generals and warriors of a similar rank.

== Persons ==
A woodblock print of the Sixteen Divine Generals of Tokugawa with Tokugawa Ieyasu pictured centrally, directly under the mountain peak.

As depicted in the woodblock print by Unsen in 1874, seven years after the end of the Tokugawa shogunate and the occurrence of the Meiji restoration, the sixteen individuals identified are:

- In the left sheet, clockwise from the top left:
  - Torii Mototada (鳥居元忠), 1539–1600
  - Hachiya Sadatsugu (蜂屋貞次), 1532–1564
  - Yonekitsu Tsuneharu (米津常春), 1524–1612
  - Torii Tadahiro (鳥居忠広), ?–1573
  - Hiraiwa Chikayoshi (平岩親吉), 1542–1611
- In the central sheet, clockwise from the top right:
  - Matsudaira Yasutada (松平康忠), 1545–1618
  - Sakakibara Yasumasa (榊原康政), 1548–1606
  - Honda Tadakatsu (本多忠勝), 1548–1610
  - Watanabe Moritsuna (渡辺守綱), 1543–1620
  - Ii Naomasa (井伊直政), 1561–1602
  - Sakai Tadatsugu (酒井忠次), 1527–1596
- In the right sheet, clockwise from the top centre:
  - Ōkubo Tadayo (大久保忠世), 1532–1594
  - Takagi Kiyohide (高木清秀), 1525–1610
  - Ōkubo Tadasuke (大久保忠佐), 1537–1613
  - Hattori Masanari (服部正成), 1542–1596
  - Naitō Masanari (内藤正成), 1528–1602

It is to be noted that some sources spell the name Masanari as Masashige; this is due to two possible readings of the kanji 成 (nari or shige). Therefore, Hattori Masanari and Naitō Masanari may be written differently. Similarly, several samurai and daimyo had different names at different stages of life (such as Ieyasu himself), and this can also lead to confusion. Hattori Masanari, for example, is also known as Hattori Hanzō, and Honda Tadakatsu was also known as Honda Heihachirō. In general, several typographic errors and confusions have been noted in listings.

== See also ==
- Four Heavenly Kings (Tokugawa)
- Tokugawa Ieyasu
