= Shitennō (Tokugawa clan) =

Group of four Japanese samurai

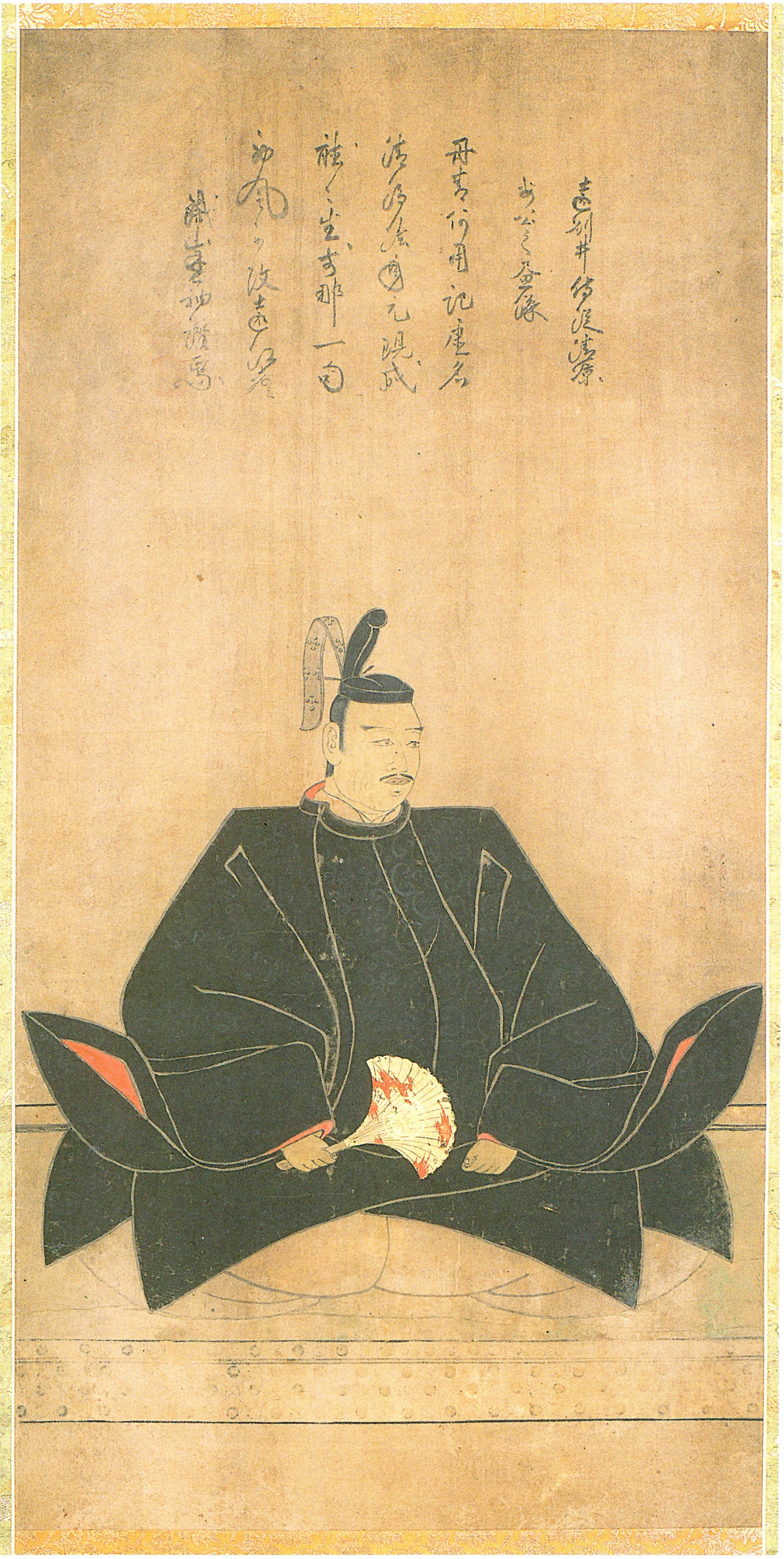
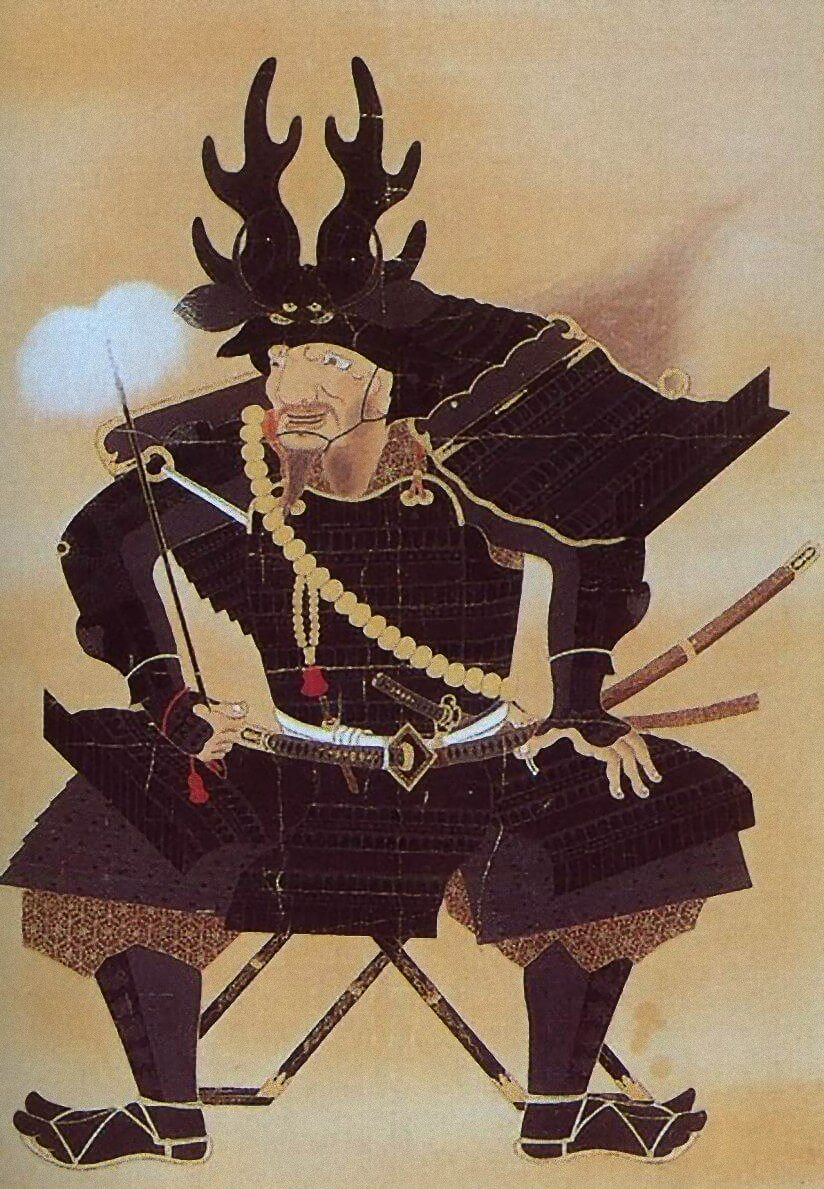
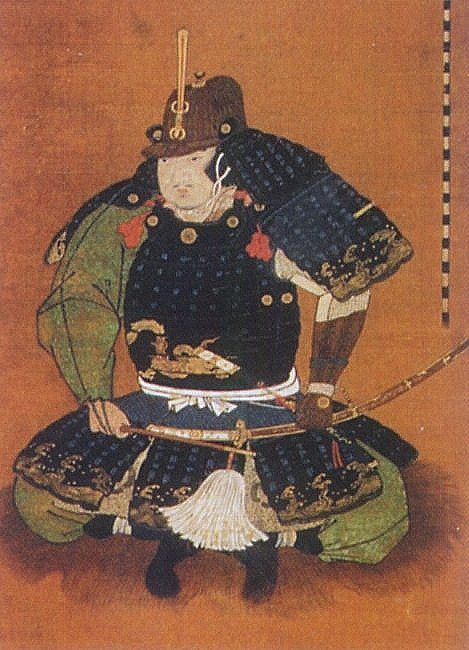
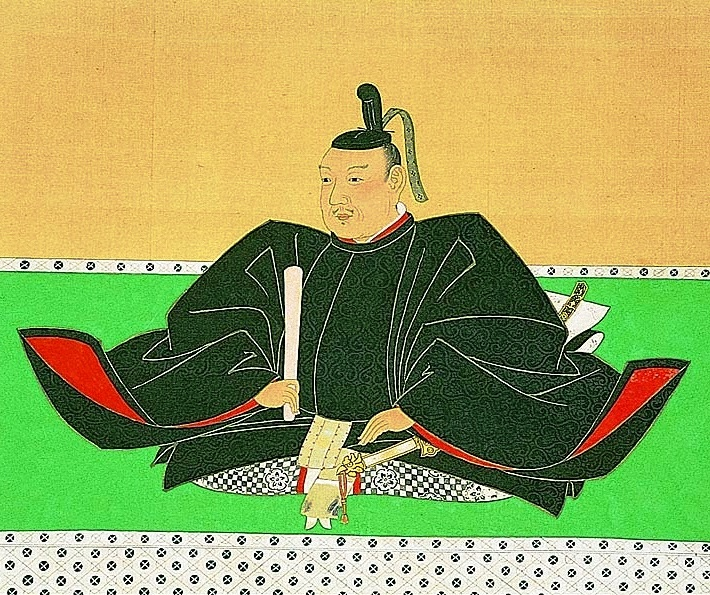
Four Heavenly Kings of the Tokugawa. Clockwise from upper left: Ii Naomasa, Honda Tadakatsu, Sakai Tadatsugu, Sakakibara Yasumasa.

The Four Heavenly Kings of the Tokugawa (徳川四天王, Tokugawa-shitennō) is a Japanese sobriquet describing four highly effective samurai generals who fought on behalf of Tokugawa Ieyasu in Sengoku period. They were famous during their lifetimes as the four most fiercely loyal vassals of the Tokugawa clan in the early Edo period.

Each of those four generals was the founder of a cadet branch clan:

- Honda Tadakatsu of the Honda clan
- Ii Naomasa of the Ii clan
- Sakakibara Yasumasa of the Sakakibara clan
- Sakai Tadatsugu of the Sakai clan

== Fudai leaders ==
Originally, the sobriquet did not exist during the Sengoku period, it first appeared in Arai Hakuseki work of Hankanfu in the Edo period. Regarding the subject figures of this grouping in 1586, according to "Sakakibara clan historical records", Ieyasu sent Honda Tadakatsu, Sakakibara Yasumasa, and Ii Naomasa as representatives to Kyoto, where the three of them were regarded as "Tokugawa Sanketsu" (Three great nobles of the Tokugawa). In following month, they were joined by Sakai Tadatsugu and were to accompany Ieyasu on his personal trip to Kyoto, where the four of them "became famous".

In 1894, Frederick Dickins recorded in English the existence of "four Tokugawa guardians" during Sengoku period, although he did not name these individuals.

=== Political aspects ===
After the peace negotiations between Tokugawa Ieyasu and Toyotomi Hideyoshi following the battle of Komaki and Nagakute, Tadatsugu, Naomasa, Tadakatsu, and Yasumasa gained fame in Kyoto.

All of the Tokugawa Shitennō possessed more than 10,000 koku (rice unit) as a Daimyo (provincial governor). Naomasa already possessed 120,000 koku, while Yasumasa and Tadakatsu respectively held domains worth 100,000 koku. However, Tadatsugu, who retired in 1588, had his successor Sakai Ietsugu only inherit a domain worth 37,000 koku. There are several theories regarding this:

- Shigeo Negishi, professor of history at Kokugakuin University, is of the opinion that the clear disparities between them were due to several factors: The first was due to deliberate political strategy by Ieyasu to strengthen control over his vassals after he relocated to the Kantō region by promoting the younger generations of loyal vassals, as he viewed that Yasumasa, Tadakatsu, and Naomasa were great assets for the future. The second reason was due to Tadatsugu himself being content with his relatively low stipend, as he already held a pivotal position as Fudai daimyō who had de facto control over the old loyalist clans of the Tokugawa originating from Higashi-Mikawa.
- Kawada Sadao, and other researchers who agreed with him, instead argued it was actually Toyotomi Hideyoshi who decided the location of the territories and domains of Tadakatsu, Yasumasa, and Naomasa. The aim of Hideyoshi was that he valued the military capabilities of the Shitennō, and the domains distributed to them held significant strategic values to defend against potential threats from Uesugi Kagekatsu, who at that time had still not submitted to Toyotomi rule. Kawada Sadao opinion is that during the restructuring of the Tokugawa clan management after the retirement of Tadatsugu, the memberships of the "Shitennō" actually consisted of five people, with Ōkubo Tadayo and Torii Mototada taking Tadakatsu's place. This version did not include Tadatsugu, since he had already retired from military service.

Regardless the version, Yū Kawamura from Chiba University saw the step to place of most military effective Tokugawa vassals in control of those regions were to pacify the populations of newly subdued territory which formerly ruled by the Hōjō clan before the Siege of Odawara (1590), while also guard the eastern domains from any influence or threat from the Satomi clan which has not yet submit to Toyotomi rule at that time.

Stephen Turnbull stated that prior to the inclusion of Ii Naomasa, the Tokugawa-shitennō consisted of Ishikawa Kazumasa, Sakai Tadatsugu, Sakakibara Yasumasa, and Honda Tadakatsu, as they fought in the battle of Anegawa.

After Battle of Sekigahara however, Ieyasu seems to have disproportionate attitude towards the Fudai daimyo vassals, as it seems he rewarded Tozama daimyō, newcomers who just entered Ieyasu service during Sekigahara Campaign such as Ikeda Terumasa, with far bigger reward of domains increase than his hereditary Fudai vassals like Yasumasa, Tadakatsu, or Naomasa. (Note: This theory is often used in popular historical novels such as Ryu Keiichiro.) It is recorded by Arthur Lindsay Sadler that Naomasa and Honda Tadakatsu expressed dissatisfaction of their rewards to Ieyasu. But this theory were contested as theory pointed records that Ieyasu originally intended to reward his Fudai generals far bigger, such as when he offered Yasumasa with 250,000 koku of domain increase, or Tadakatsu with 150,000 koku. However, both of them refused and instead assign the domain rewards to their sons. Furthermore, Harold Bolitho pointed out after the Tokugawa shogunate established, these Fudai lords refused to take part in larger government administration and rather focusing on governing their own respective military domains.

=== Cultural & Religious aspects ===
The sobriquet evolved from the "Four Heavenly Kings" of Buddhist iconography. These are said to be the guardians of the four horizons.

"Tokugawa 16 Divine Generals" (Tokugawa jūrokushinshōjin); Another cultural depiction about Tokugawa Fudai lords group has the original Shitenno Ii Naomasa, Sakai Tadatsugu, Honda Tadakatsu, and Sakakibara Yasumasa included in the more expanded version of collectives. The name of those 16 generals were enshrined in Nikkō Tōshō-gū shrine. It is thought that the numbers of the Four Heavenly Kings and Twelve Divine Generals of Buddhism were added together to form the "16 Divine Generals" has religious and cultural aspect to associate Ieyasu Tokugawa as central figure of personality cult, just like Buddha is guarded by sixteen divines or celestial deities in Buddhism. This list has additional 12 figures:

1. Ōkubo Tadayo (1532 – 1594)
2. Torii Mototada (1539 – 1600)
3. Hattori Hanzō (1542 - 1596)
4. Watanabe Moritsuna（1542 - 1620）
5. Ōkubo Tadasuke (1537-1613)
6. Yonegizu Tsuneharu (1524 - 1612)
7. Takagi Kiyohide (1526 - 1610)
8. Naitō Masanari (1528 - 1602)
9. Hachiya Sadatsugu (1539-1564) / Uemura Iemasa (1541-1577)
10. Torii Tadahiro (? - 1573)
11. Hiraiwa Chikayoshi (1542 - 1611)
12. Matsudaira Yasutada (1545-1618) / Matsudaira Ietada (1555-1600)

"Tokugawa 24 generals" (Tokugawa Nijūshi-shōjin); Another cultural depiction also expand the names above into more expanded version of the 16 Tokugawa generals with 8 more addition members. This list include another 8 Tokugawa generals:

1. Osuga Yasutaka (1527-1589)
2. Itakura Katsushige (1545 - 1624)
3. Toda Tadatsugu (1531 - 1597)
4. Mizuno Tadashige (1541 - 1600)
5. Atsumi Katsukichi (1557 - 1616)
6. Andō Naotsugu（1555 - 1635）
7. Sakai Shigetada (1549 - 1617)
8. Matsudaira Sadakatsu（1560 - 1624）
9. Honda Toshimasa (? - ?)

"Tokugawa 28 generals" (Tokugawa nijūhachishinshōjin); A bigger version of the groupings which depicted in the painting made by Tsukioka Yoshitoshi (1839–1892). This group were consisted of the original 16 Tokugawa generals plus another addition Tokugawa generals. It consisted of 12 different figures from the "Tokugawa 24 generals" version. The 12 additional members consisted:

1. Okudaira Nobumasa (1555 – 1615)
2. Sakai Masachika (1521 - 1576)
3. Ina Tadatsugu（1550 – 1610）
4. Honda Tadatoshi (? - 1564)
5. Okabe Nakamori (1568 - 1632)
6. Ōkubo Tadataka (1560 – 1639)
7. Suganuma Sadamitsu (1542–1604)
8. Naitō Ienaga (1546 – 1600)
9. Naitō Nobunari (1545 – 1612)
10. Honda Yasutaka (? - ?)
11. Matsudaira Koretada (1537 - 1575)
12. Mizuno Katsunari (1564–1651)

== Tokugawa Four Gallery ==
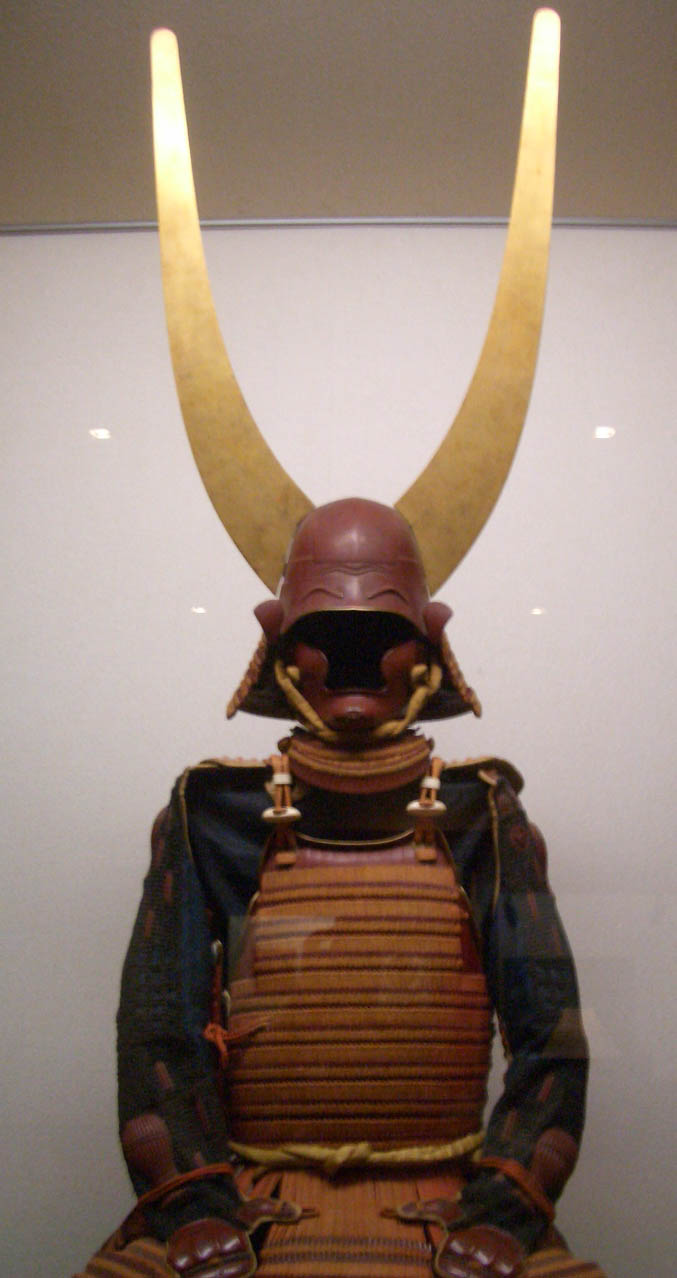
Ii Naomasa Armor at Hikone Castle (1561–1602)

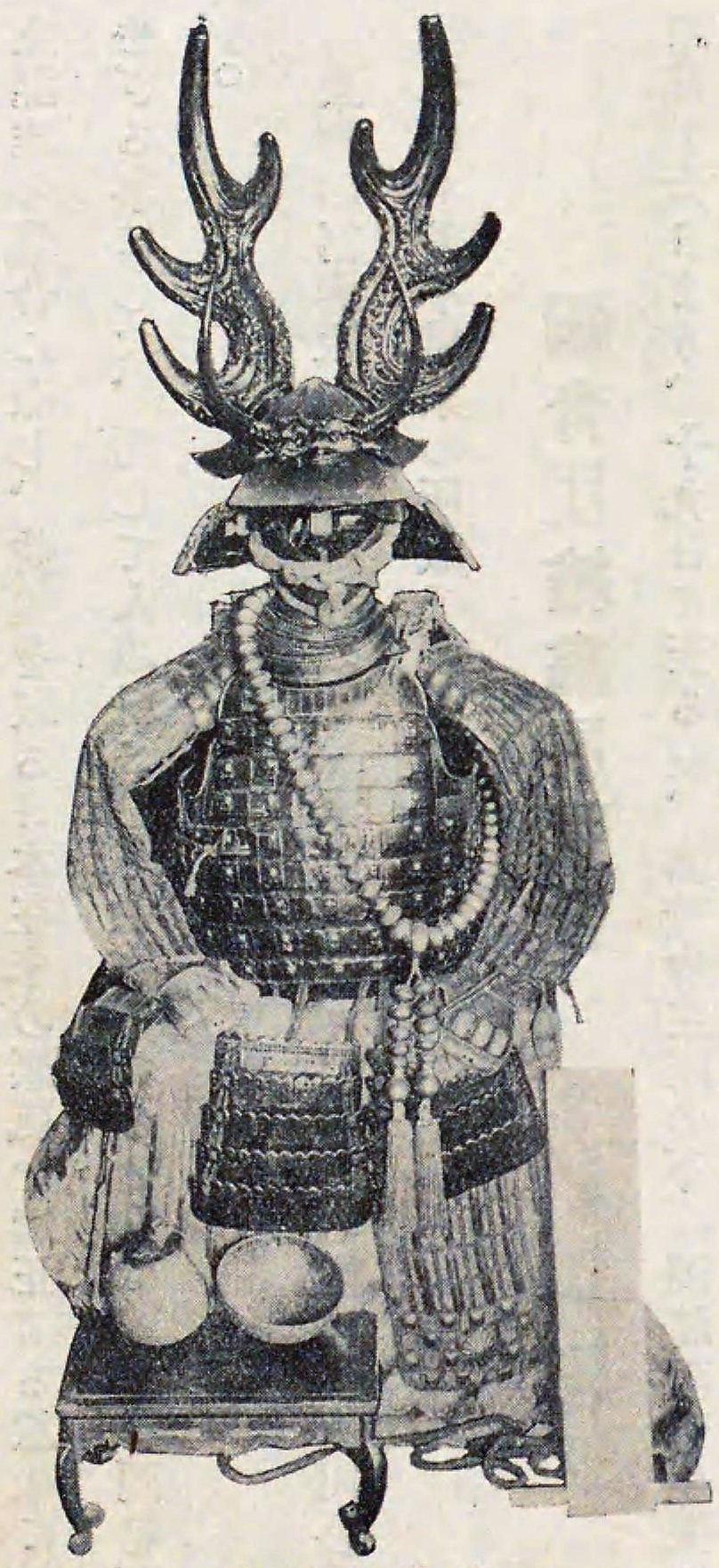
Honda Tadakatsu armor, at Mikawa Bushi Museum, Okazaki, Aichi prefecture (1548–1610)

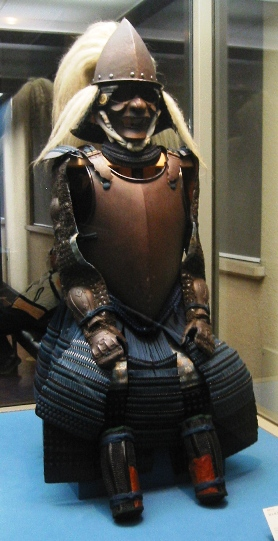
Sakakibara Yasumasa's Gusoku armor with Nanban(european) style. (1548–1606)

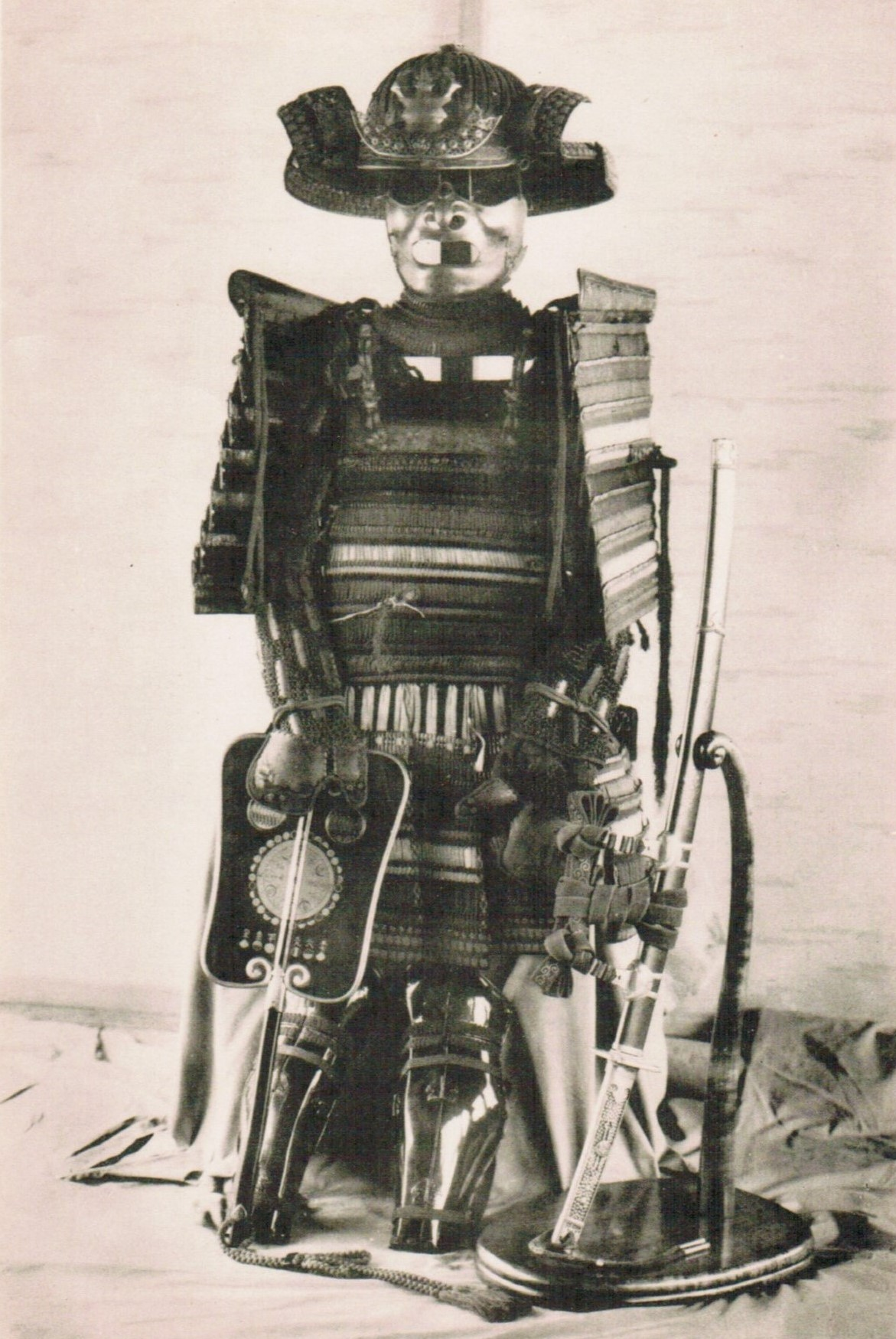
Sakai Tadatsugu Iroiro Dō-maru armor, Chidō Museum (1527–1596)

== See also ==
- Shitennō (samurai)
- Shitennō-ji
- Kōdōkan Shitennō

== Appendix ==
=== Bibliography ===
- Appert, Georges and H. Kinoshita. (1888). Ancien Japon. Tokyo: Imprimerie Kokubunsha. OCLC 4429674
- Harada Kazutoshi (2009). Art of the Samurai Japanese Arms and Armor, 1156-1868. Metropolitan Museum of Art (New York, N.Y.). ISBN 9781588393456.
- Nussbaum, Louis Frédéric and Käthe Roth. (2005). Japan Encyclopedia. Cambridge: Harvard University Press. ISBN 978-0-674-01753-5; OCLC 48943301
- Bolitho, Harold. (1974). Treasures Among Men: The Fudai Daimyo in Tokugawa Japan. New Haven: Yale University Press. ISBN 978-0-300-01655-0; OCLC 185685588
