= Masashige =

- Gender: Male

Origin
- Origin: Japanese
- Meaning: Different meanings depending on the kanji used

Masashige (written: 正成, 正重, 政重 or 政繁) is a masculine Japanese given name. Notable people with the name include:

- Hattori Masashige (服部 正重) (1580–1652), Japanese samurai
- Inoue Masashige (井上 政重) (1585–1662), Japanese daimyō
- Jōjō Masashige (上条 政繁) (1545–1643), Japanese samurai
- Kusunoki Masashige (楠木 正成) (1294–1336), Japanese samurai
