= Watanabe Moritsuna =

Samurai of the Sengoku era; major samurai ally of the Tokugawa clan

- 渡辺 守綱
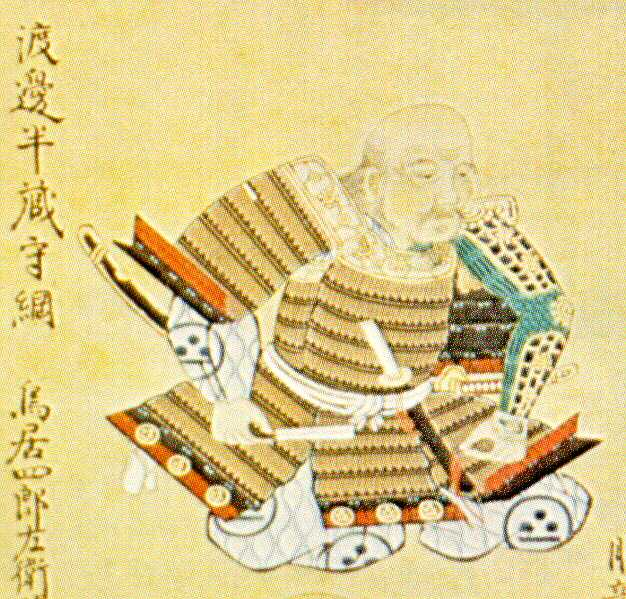

Lord of Terabe Castle
- In office 1590–1620

Personal details
- Born: 1542 Mikawa Province
- Died: 1620 (aged 77–78) Mikawa Province
- Nickname: Yari no Hanzō (Hanzō the spear)

Military service
- Allegiance: Tokugawa clan Tokugawa Shogunate
- Commands: Terabe Castle
- Battles/wars: Battle of Nagasawa (1561); Battle of Azukizaka (1564); Siege of Kakegawa (1569); Battle of Anegawa (1570); Battle of Mikatagahara (1573); Battle of Nagashino (1575); Battle of Komaki-Nagakute (1584); Siege of Odawara (1590); Battle of Sekigahara (1610); Siege of Osaka (1614)

Watanabe Moritsuna (渡辺 守綱; 1542–1620) or Watanabe Hanzō, nicknamed Yari no Hanzō (槍の半蔵, Spear Hanzō), was a Japanese samurai of the Watanabe clan, who served the Tokugawa clan under Tokugawa Ieyasu and later served as a hatamoto and then a daimyo to the Tokugawa shogunate. He is one of the Tokugawa 16 divine generals (Tokugawa jūrokushinshōjin).

== Biography ==
Watanabe Moritsuna was born in Urabe Village in Nukata District, Mikawa Province (present day Okazaki) in 1542. His father was Watanabe Takatsuna, a retainer for the Matsudaira clan. His maternal grandfather was Watanabe Yoshituna, who fought under Sakai Tadatsugu against the Oda clan.

Moritsuna joined the Tokugawa in 1557, and served Matsudaira Motoyasu (later named Tokugawa Ieyasu) in major military campaigns for most of his career. In 1561, Moritsuna achieved military merit during the battle of Nagasawa castle, as he managed to personally slay the enemy general during the battle. After this battle, he participated with the Tokugawa clan pacification of the rest of Mikawa province.

In 1563, Moritsuna joined the Ikkō-ikki rebels in Mikawa along with his father Takatsuna, and for a time became an enemy of Tokugawa Ieyasu. After the uprising was subdued in 1564 by Ieyasu at the Battle of Azukizaka, where Moritsuna was wounded by Abe Tadamasa and Takatsuna was killed, Moritsuna was pardoned and returned to serve the Tokugawa clan.

In 1569, during the Siege of Kakegawa Castle in Tōtōmi Province, Moritsuna, together with Honda Shigetsugu and other Tokugawa samurai, fought in close combat until they managed to breach the castle gate. In 1570, Moritsuna fought in the Battle of Anegawa against the Azai and the Asakura clans.

In 1573, during the Battle of Mikatagahara, Moritsuna and Hattori Hanzō performed with exceptional skill with their spears (in Japanese, yari (槍)). During the battle he fought in retreat to cover Ieyasu and personally blocked any incoming enemy attacks with his spear. Following the retreat, Moritsuna, along with Torii Mototada, led the flanking maneuver of the Tokugawa counter attack. Following the battle, Moritsuna was nicknamed Yari no Hanzō (Spear Hanzo) and praised in poetry, alongside Hattori Hanzō as Oni no Hanzō (Hanzō the demon) and Atsumi Gengo as Kubi-Tori Gengo (Gengo the headtaker).

In 1575, Moritsuna fought in the Battle of Nagashino, where he killed both Yamamoto Sugasuke, the eldest son of Yamamoto Kansuke, and the ronin Nawa Murisuke, a commander under Takeda Nobuzane. At the same battle, Moritsuna's younger brother, Watanabe Masatsuna, killed Sanada Nobutsuna.

In 1579, Matsudaira Nobuyasu was accused of treason and conspiracy by Oda Nobunaga and was therefore ordered to commit seppuku by Ieyasu. Moritsuna was to assist in the seppuku ritual and behead Nobuyasu but wavered at the last second. (Note: The source of Watanabe Moritsuna's involvement in Nobuyasu's seppuku is the Kashiwazaki Monogatari (柏崎物語; 1787), cited in the Tokugawa Jikki (1849). The Kashiwazaki Monogatari is notable for associating Tokugawa superstition of Muramasa swords to Nobuyasu's seppuku. Later editions of the Tokugawa Jikki replace Moritsuna with Hattori Hanzō.)

In 1582, Moritsuna was one of Ieyasu's escorts during his escape to Mikawa in the aftermath of the assassination of Oda Nobunaga.

In 1584, Moritsuna fought in the Battle of Komaki and Nagakute. (Note: Chinoike Park, literally "Blood Pond Park", in Nagakute is named for the pond where Watanabe Moritsuna and his soldiers washed their weapons following the battle.) After the Siege of Odawara (1590), Moritsuna was given control of a domain in Musashi of 3,000 koku and command of 50 ashigaru infantry.

In 1600, Moritsuna served in Ieyasu's guards during the Battle of Sekigahara.

In 1608, Moritsuna became a retainer for the ninth son of Ieyasu, Tokugawa Yoshinao of the Owari Domain. His domains were increased with lands in Owari Iwasaku of 5,000 koku and in Mikawa of 5,000 koku, making him a daimyo with a total of 14,000 koku. Moritsuna served in both the Winter Siege (1614) and the Summer Siege (1615) of Osaka, as guardian to Yoshinao. In 1618, he was appointed Lord of Terabe Castle.

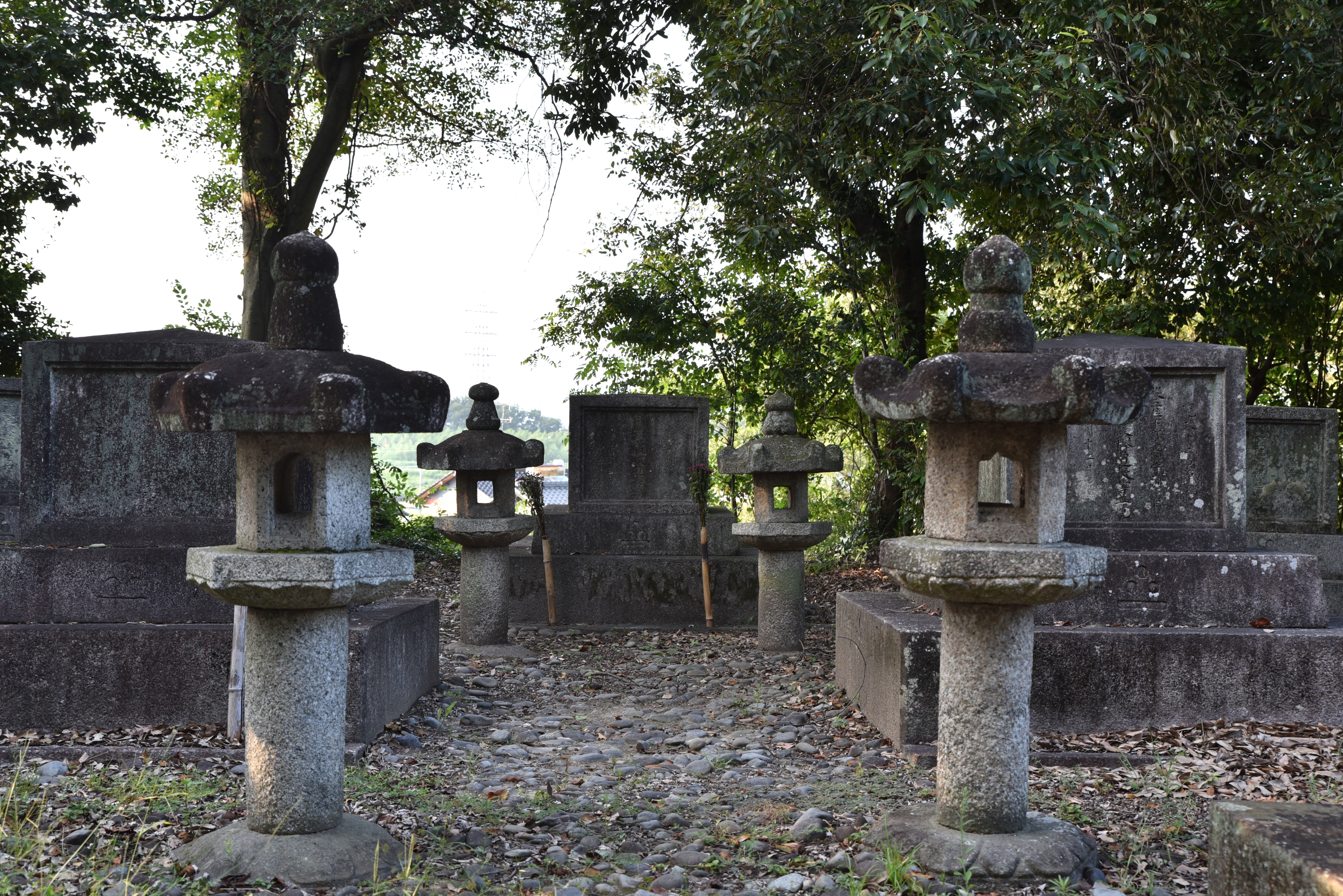
Watanabe Moritsuna's grave (Toyota, Aichi Prefecture)

Moritsuna died in 1620. His grave is located in Shukoji Temple in Toyota, Aichi, founded in his honor by his grandson, Watanabe Harutsuna. A second Shukoji temple in his honor is located in Nagoya.

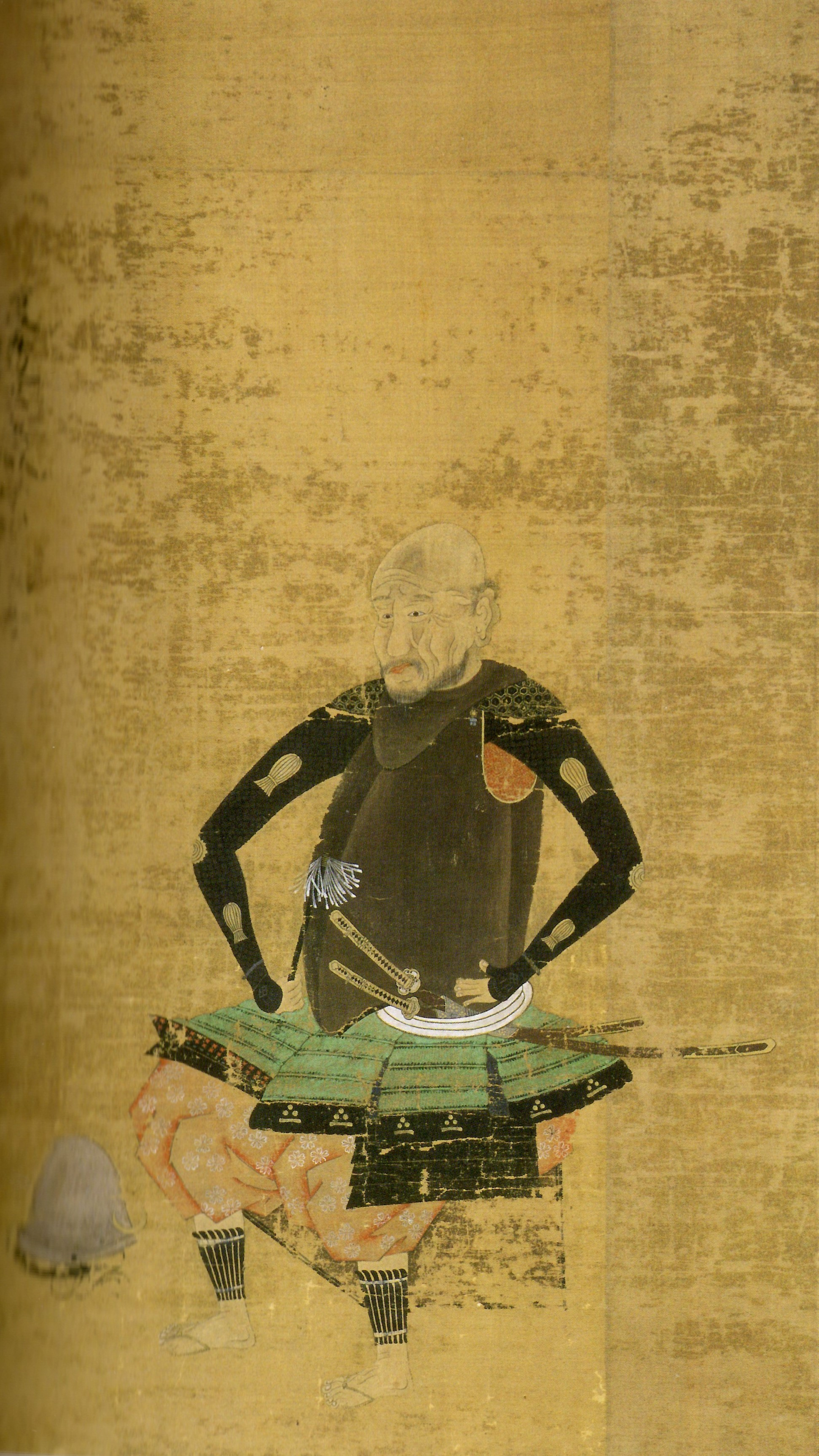
Watanabe Moritsuna wearing nanban dou (dō) gusoku

== Personal info ==
Watanabe Moritsuna wore European-style armor, including a morion helmet and nanban dou (dō) gusoku.

Moritsuna wrote his memoirs in Watanabe Chūemon.

== Family ==
Watanabe Moritsuna's wife was the daughter of Hiraiwa Chikayoshi. He had three sons and four daughters. The eldest son, Watanabe Shigetsuna (1574-1648), fought for Ieyasu at the Battle of Sekigahara and would be the first of the Hanzo branch of the Watanabe clan. Moritsuna's grandson and Shigetsuna's fifth son, Watanabe Yoshitsune (1611-1668), would be the first of the Hakata Watanabe.

== Appendix ==
=== Bibliography ===
- Harada Kazutoshi (2009). Art of the Samurai Japanese Arms and Armor, 1156-1868. Metropolitan Museum of Art (New York, N.Y.). ISBN 9781588393456.
