= Inuyama Domain =

Feudal domain in Owari Province, Japan

Inuyama Domain 犬山藩
- Domain of Japan
- 1600–1611; 1616–1871
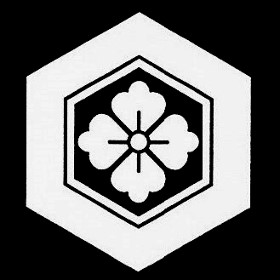
- Mon of the Naruse clan
- Capital: Inuyama Castle
  - Type: Daimyō
- Historical era: Edo period
  - Established: 1600
  - Disestablished: 1871
- Today part of: Aichi Prefecture

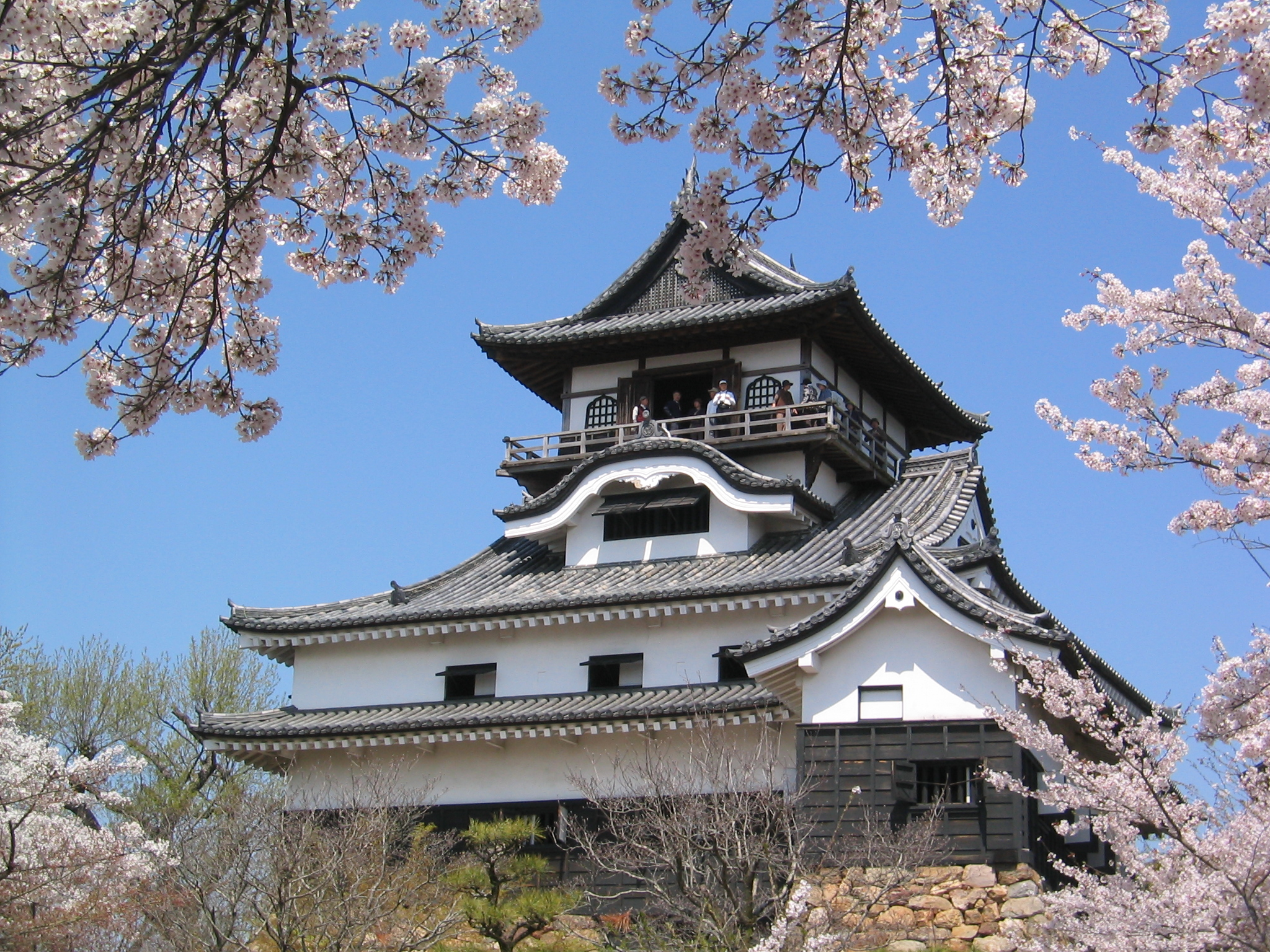
Inuyama Castle

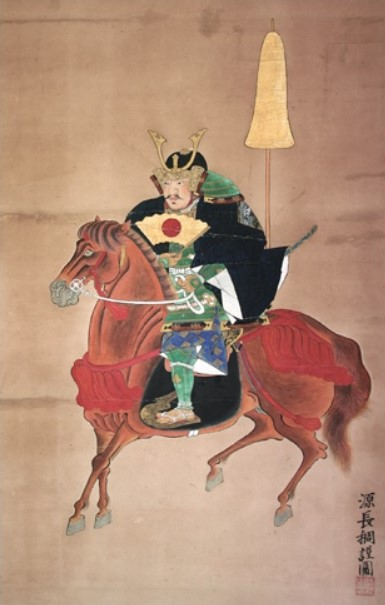
Ogasawara Yoshitsugu, founder of Inuyama Domain

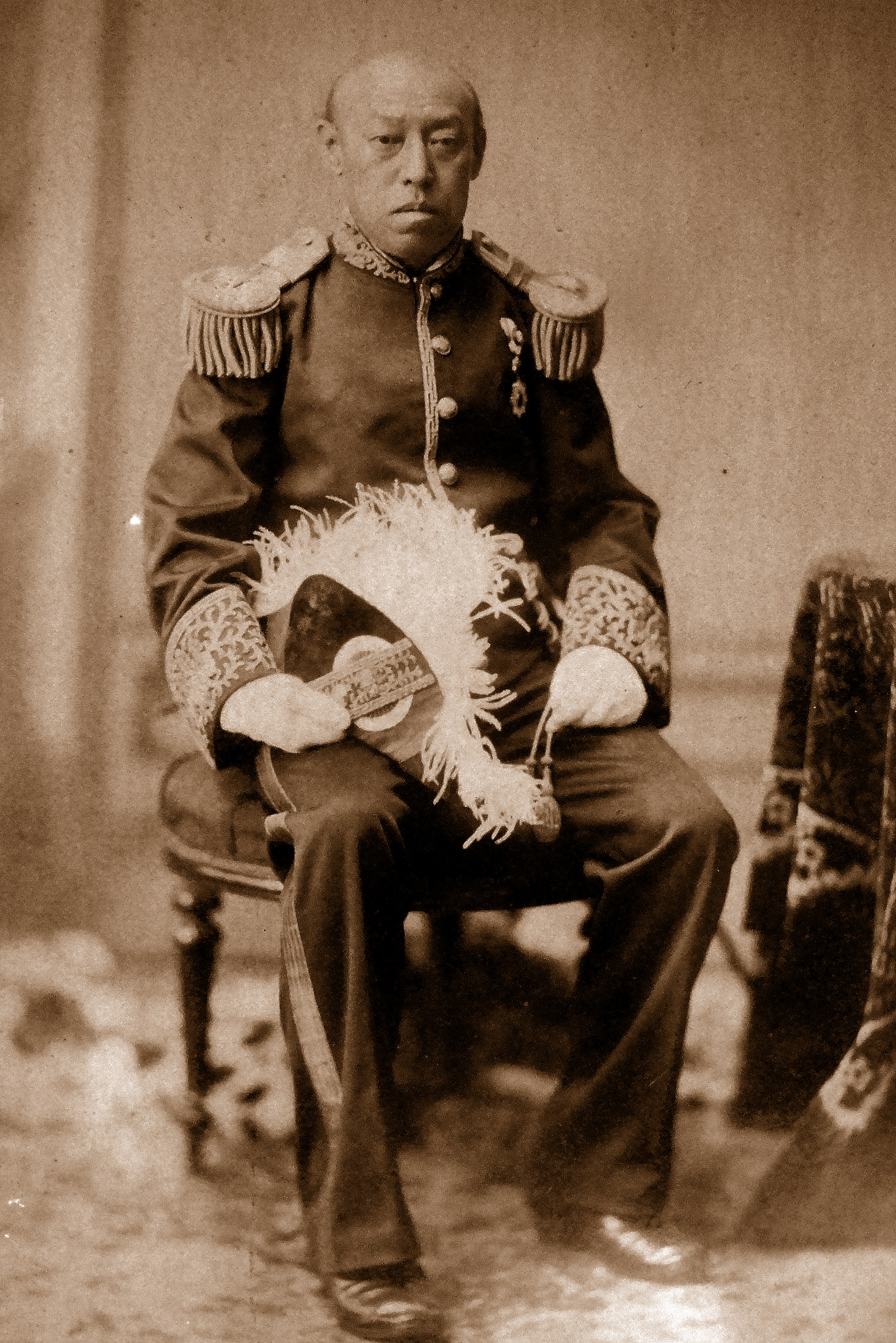
Naruse Masamitsu, final daimyo of Inuyama Domain

The Inuyama Domain (犬山藩, Inuyama-han) was a feudal domain in Owari Province, Japan. It was not officially designated as a domain by the Tokugawa Shogunate, when major domains were established, but was finally designated a domain in 1868. The domain was controlled from Inuyama Castle, which is located in present-day Inuyama, Aichi Prefecture.

== History ==
Ishikawa Mitsuyoshi, the daimyo of Inuyama Castle, who joined the West Army at the Battle of Sekigahara in 1600, was deprived of his fief, and instead, Matsudaira Tadayoshi the fourth son of Tokugawa Ieyasu, who joined the Kiyosu Domain, entered Owari with 520,000 koku. At this time, it was the beginning of Inuyama's territory that Ogasawara Yoshitsugu was given territory to Inuyama as the chief retainer of Tadayoshi. In 1607, Yoshitsugu was transferred to the Shimosa Sakura Domain. In this year, in the Kiyosu Domain, the daimyo of the domain, Tadayoshi, died of illness without an heir, and the Kiyosu Domain became a uninusted and kaieki. After that, Ieyasu's ninth son, Tokugawa Yoshinao, ruled Owari as the lord of the Owari Domain, and Hiraiwa Chikakichi, a senior vassal of the Tokugawa clan, entered Inuyama Castle with 113,000 koku (93,000 koku according to one theory) as Yoshinao's chief retainer. However, in 1611, Chikayoshi died of illness without an heir, and according to his will, his territory was absorbed by the Owari Domain (however, in the history of the Inuyama Domain, Hiraiwa Yoshinori succeeded Chikayoshi and ruled until 1617).

In 1617, Naruse Masashige, a chief retainer of Yoshinao, entered with 30,000 koku, and Naruse Inuyama, who assisted the Owari Domain, was established here. In 1659, when the third head of the family, Naurse Masachika, he ruled a total of 35,000 koku with an increase of 5,000 koku, and became a senior vassal who ruled the largest chigyo of the Owari Domain. In addition, Inuyama Castle was developed under the reign of Yoshitsugu, and the castle town and castle were maintained, and it is considered to be a national treasure as a castle with the oldest keep. In January 1868, due to the new government's Ishin-Ritsuhan, the Inuyama Naruse clan officially became the lord of the Inuyama Domain and became independent from the Owari Domain of the Owari Tokugawa clan. In 1869, the final daimyo of the domain, Naruse Masamitsu, was appointed as the governor of the Inuyama Domain due to the return of lands and people.

On July 14, 1871 the Inuyama Domain became Inuyama Prefecture, and on November 22, it was merged into Nagoya Prefecture (based on the Owari Domain). Later, after the name of this Nagoya Prefecture was renamed Aichi Prefecture, Nukata Prefecture (former Mikawa Province and former Chita County, Owari Province) were merged.

== Holdings at the end of the Edo period ==
- Owari Province
  - Aichi County - 3 villages
  - Kasugai-gun - 6 villages
  - Niwa County - 33 villages
  - Haguri County - 1 village
  - Nakajima-gun - 4 villages
  - Kaito County
  - Kaisai County - 1 village
  - Chita County - 4 villages
- Mino Province
  - Nakajima County - 3 villages
  - Tage County - 1 village
  - Anpachi County - 2 villages

== List of daimyo ==
The Inuyama Domain was controlled by three families: Ogasawara, Hiraiwa, and Naruse.

| # | Name | Tenure | Courtesy title | Court Rank | kokudaka |
|---|---|---|---|---|---|
Ogasawara clan, 1600 - 1606 (fudai daimyo)
| 1 | Ogasawara Yoshitsugu (小笠原吉次) | 1600 - 1606 | Iyo no kami, Izumo no kami (いよの神、出雲の神) | Junior 5th Rank, Lower Grade (従五位下) | 113,000 koku |
Hiraiwa clan, 1607 - 1611 (fudai daimyo)
| 1 | Hiraiwa Chikayoshi (平岩親吉) | 1607 - 1611 | Jugoinoge (十人野人) | Junior 5th Rank, Lower Grade (従五位下) | 113,000 koku |
Naruse clan, 1616 - 1625 (fudai daimyo)
| 1 | Naruse Masanari (成瀬正成) | 1616 - 1625 | Hayato Tadashi (早人忠) | Junior 5th Rank, Lower Grade (従五位下) | 40,000 koku |
| 2 | Naruse Masatora (成瀬正虎) | 1625 - 1659 | Hayato Tadashi (早人忠) | Junior 5th Rank, Lower Grade (従五位下) | 40,000 koku |
| 3 | Naruse Masachika (成瀬正親) | 1659 - 1703 | Shiano no kami, Hayato Tadashi (早人忠) | Junior 5th Rank, Lower Grade (従五位下椎野の神) | 40,000 koku |
| 4 | Naruse Masayuki (成瀬正幸) | 1703 - 1732 | Hayato Tadashi (早人忠) | Junior 5th Rank, Lower Grade (従五位下) | 40,000 koku |
| 5 | Naruse Masamoto (成瀬正泰) | 1732 - 1768 | Hayato Tadashi (早人忠) | Junior 5th Rank, Lower Grade (従五位下) | 40,000 koku |
| 6 | Naruse Masanori (成瀬正典) | 1768 - 1809 | Hayato Tadashi (早人忠) | Junior 5th Rank, Lower Grade (従五位下) | 40,000 koku |
| 7 | Naruse Masanaga (成瀬正壽) | 1809 - 1838 | Minbu Shofu (早人忠) | Junior 5th Rank, Lower Grade (従五位下) | 40,000 koku |
| 8 | Naruse Masazumi (成瀬正住) | 1838 - 1857 | Hayato Tadashi (早人忠) | Junior 5th Rank, Lower Grade (従五位下) | 40,000 koku |
| 9 | Naruse Masamitsu (成瀬正肥) | 1857 - 1871 | Hayato Tadashi (早人忠) | Junior 5th Rank, Lower Grade (従五位下) | 40,000 koku |

== See also ==
- List of Han
- Abolition of the han system
