= Hattori Masanari =

Samurai of the Sengoku era; major samurai ally of the Tokugawa clan

- 服部 正就

Leader of Iga Ninja
- In office 1596–1615
- Preceded by: Hattori Hanzo
- Succeeded by: Hattori Masashige

Personal details
- Born: Masanari; 1565
- Died: June 3, 1615 (aged 49–50)
- Parent: Hattori Hanzo (father)
- Relatives: Hattori Masashige (brother); Hattori Masahiro (brother)

Military service
- Allegiance: Tokugawa clan Tokugawa Shogunate
- Battles/wars: Siege of Odawara; Osaka Campaign

Hattori Masanari (服部 正就; 1565 – June 3, 1615) was the third Hattori Hanzō and a retainer under the Tokugawa clan during the late Sengoku period of Japanese history. He was the eldest son of the famous Hattori Hanzō.

Masanari began to fight alongside his father by the mid 1590s, succeeding him in 1596 at age 31. Following the Battle of Sekigahara of 1600, Masanari was enlisted by Tokugawa Ieyasu as captain of the Edo Castle guards. The band of Iga placed under his command, however, rebelled in response to Masanari's treatment causing him to be utterly humiliated in the face of the Tokugawa. While tracking two members who had fled, he killed a man in what turned out to be a case of mistaken identity and was relieved of his position. In order to repair the Hattori name and his reputation, Masanari valiantly fought during the Siege of Osaka in 1614-1615 as head of 60 Iga ninja. He was cut down in the process of the second siege of Osaka, and was succeeded by his brother Hattori Masashige.
