= Sainen-ji (Shinjuku) =

Buddhist temple in Tokyo, Japan

Coordinates: 35°41′05″N 139°43′32″E

- 西念寺
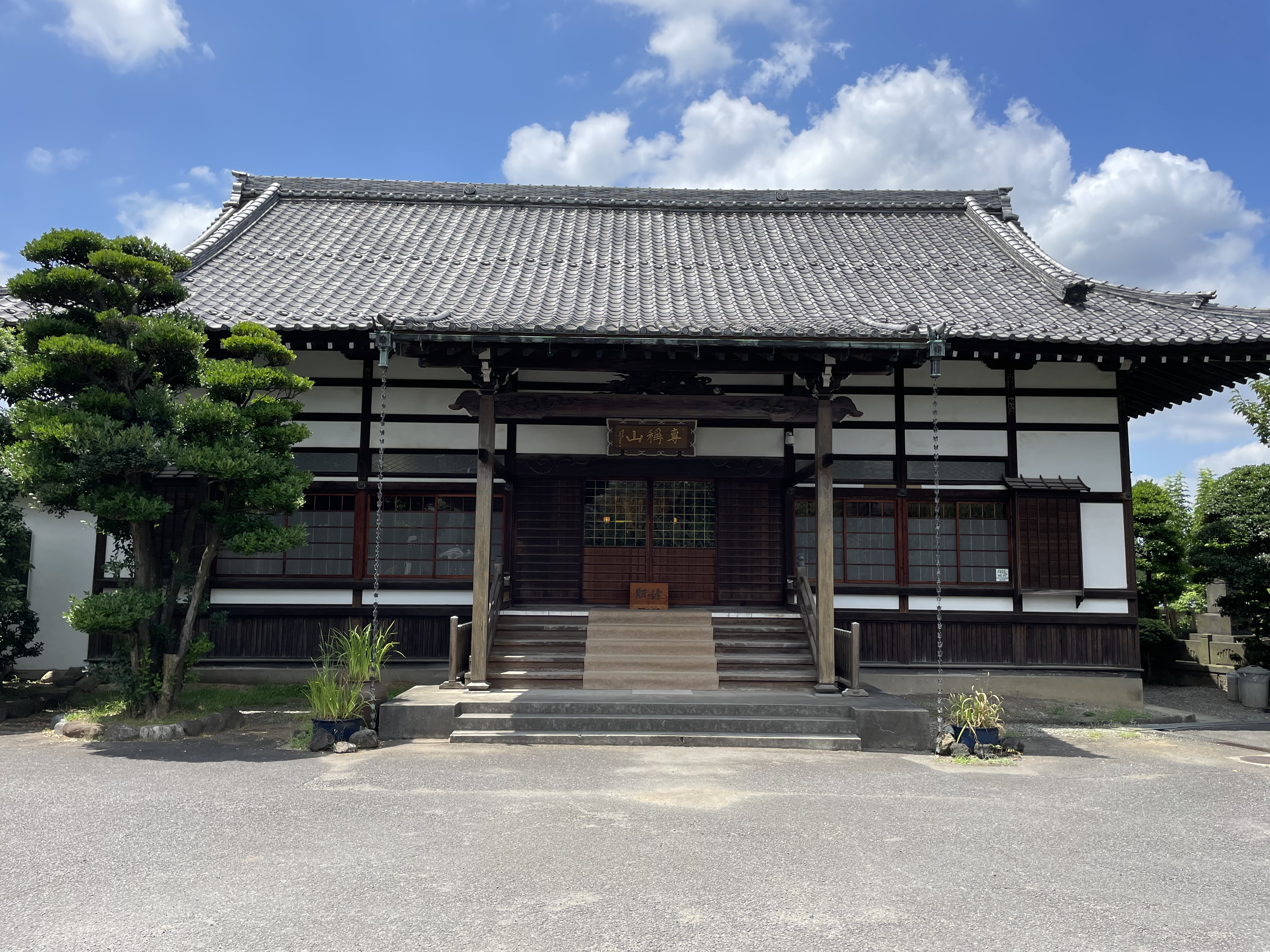
- The Main Hall of Sainen-ji

Religion
- Affiliation: Jōdo-shū

Location
- Location: Japan, 〒160-0011 Tokyo, Shinjuku City, Wakaba, 2 Chome−
- Interactive map of Sainen-ji

Architecture
- Founder: Hattori Hanzō

Website
- www.yotsuya-sainenji.or.jp

Sainen-ji (西念寺) is a Buddhist temple belonging to the Jōdo-shū sect, located in Shinjuku Ward, Tokyo, Japan. It is known as the temple founded by Hattori Hanzō, a famous samurai of the Sengoku Period who served Tokugawa Ieyasu. The temple is the family temple of the Hattori clan, and contains the graves of Hanzō and other members of the Hattori clan. In addition, there is a memorial tower that is said to have been built by Hanzō for Tokugawa Ieyasu's eldest son, Nobuyasu, whom Hanzō served as guardian.

== History ==
Sainen-ji Temple was founded in 1594, shortly after the Tokugawa clan took possession of Edo, when Hattori Hanzō founded its predecessor, An'yoin, in Shimizudani, Kojimachi, Edo (near modern-day Shimizudani Park in Kioicho, Chiyoda Ward). Hanzō took the Buddhist name Saien to commemorate the soul of Matsudaira Nobuyasu, who had died an untimely death. He built a memorial tower at An'yoin and spent the rest of his life praying for Nobuyasu's soul. After his death in 1597, he was posthumously given the Buddhist name Senshoinden An'yo Saien Daizenjomon and was buried in the same hermitage.

Later, due to the expansion of Edo Castle in the surrounding area, An'yo-in was moved to its current location in around 1634 and newly built as a temple. The current mountain name and temple name of Sainen-ji are derived from his posthumous name.

== Historic sites and cultural properties ==
- Tokugawa (Matsudaira) Nobuyasu Memorial Tower: Shinjuku Ward designated historic site. Located behind the current main hall on the right side, it is a large Gorinto (stone tower) in a stone fence with a stone door bearing the three-leaf hollyhock crest, and has an inscription on the front that reads "Sanshu Tatsuiwa Zentsu Daikoshi in front of Seiryu-ji Temple." There is an explanatory board for the "Okazaki Saburo Nobuyasu Memorial Tower" installed by the Shinjuku Ward Board of Education.
- The Grave of Hattori Hanzō: A designated historic site by Shinjuku Ward. A large stone pagoda to the immediate left of the entrance to the temple cemetery is engraved with the words "Anyo Saien Daizenjomon" and "14th day of the 1st year of the Heishin era (1606)." There is also an explanatory board for "Hattori Hanzo's Grave" set up by the Shinjuku Ward Board of Education.
- Hattori Hanzo's spear: Registered tangible cultural property of Shinjuku Ward. The temple has a spear that is said to have been bestowed by Ieyasu at Hamamatsu Castle to Hattori Hanzō, nicknamed "Spear Hanzō" due to his proficiency with spears, as a temple treasure. The spear was once about one and a half ken (about 2.6 meters), but is now chipped and shorter.

== Gallery ==
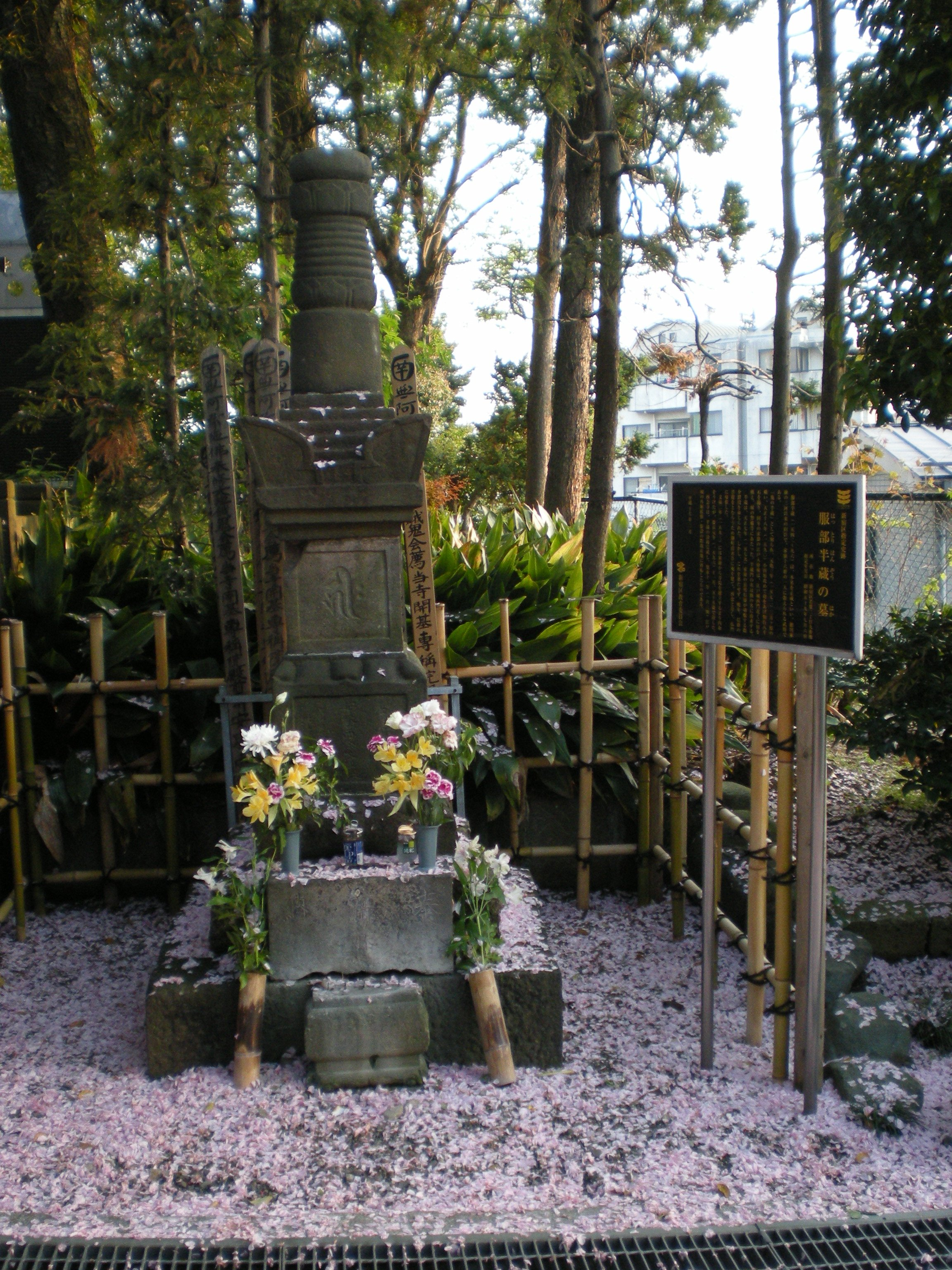
The grave of Hattori Hanzō

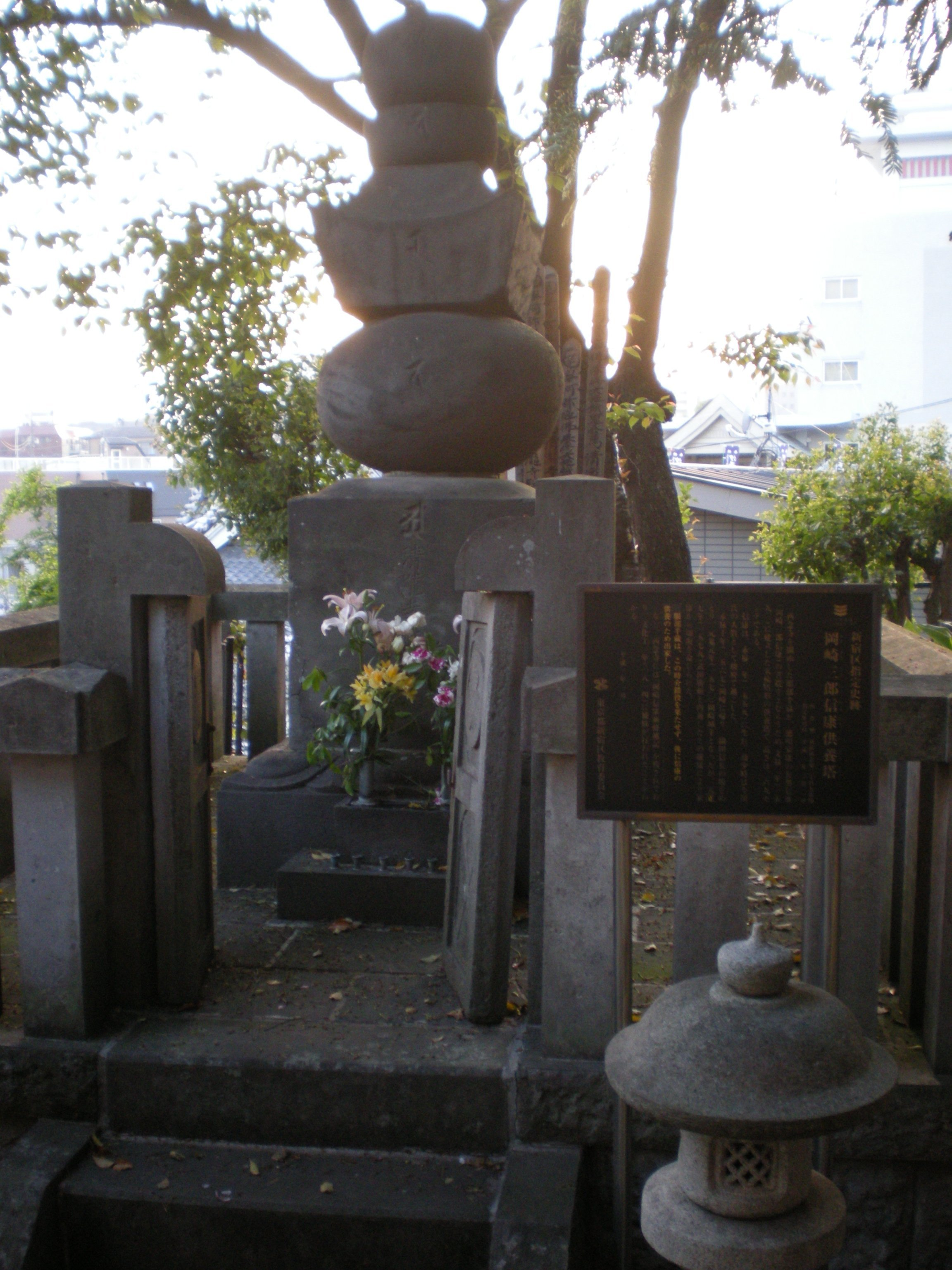
The Gorintō of Matsudaira Nobuyasu
