= Sakakibara Yasukatsu =

Japanese daimyō

2nd Lord of Tatebayashi
- In office 1606–1615
- Deputy: Clan Elders Nakane Kichiemon, Harada Gonzaemon, Murakami Yaemon
- Preceded by: Sakakibara Yasumasa
- Succeeded by: Sakakibara Tadatsugu

Personal details
- Born: 1590
- Died: June 23, 1615 (age 26)
- Spouse: Katō Koya (daughter of Katō Kiyomasa)
- Children: Sakakibara Katsumasa

Sakakibara Yasukatsu (榊原 康勝; 1590 – June 23, 1615) was a Japanese daimyō of the early Edo period who ruled the Tatebayashi Domain. His court title was Tōtōmi no kami. Yasukatsu was the third son of Sakakibara Yasumasa, who was one of the four chief generals of Tokugawa Ieyasu.

As Yasumasa's eldest son Tadamasa was given in adoption to the Osuga family, and the second son Tadanaga died young, Yasukatsu inherited his father's fief and became lord of Tatebayashi, which was rated at 100,000 koku in size. He took part in the winter Siege of Osaka, assisting the hard-pressed forces of Satake Yoshinobu. In the summer siege the following year, he was defeated in Sanada Yukimura's counterattack. Soon after the siege, Yasukatsu died at 26 of a bad case of hemorrhoids. After Yasukatsu's death his son Tadatsugu succeeded him; Tadatsugu's only son Katsumasa became a hatamoto.

Both Yasukatsu and his father Yasumasa are playable characters from the Eastern Army in the original Kessen.

Preceded by Sakakibara Yasumasa	2nd Daimyō of Tatebayashi; 1606–1615	Succeeded by Sakakibara Tadatsugu
