= Hattori Masashige =

Samurai of the Sengoku era; major samurai ally of the Tokugawa clan

- 服部 正重

Leader of Iga Ninja
- In office 1615–1652
- Preceded by: Hattori Masanari

Personal details
- Born: 1580
- Died: 1652 (aged 71–72)
- Parent: Hattori Hanzo (father)
- Relatives: Hattori Masanari (brother); Hattori Masahiro (brother)

Military service
- Allegiance: Tokugawa clan Tokugawa Shogunate
- Battles/wars: Battle of Sekigahara; Osaka Campaign

Hattori Masashige (服部 正重; 1580–1652) was an Edo period Ninja and the fourth Hattori Hanzō. His older brother was Hattori Masanari and his younger brother was the monk Hattori Masahiro. His wife was the daughter of Ōkubo Nagayasu.

He fought his first battle at 20 years old at the Battle of Sekigahara and went on to fight in the Siege of Osaka after his brothers death at Osaka he succeeded him and became leader of the Iga mono. He went on to serve the Tokugawa after they secured the shogunate.
