= Hattori Hanzō =

Sengoku era Samurai and ally of the Tokugawa clan

- 服部 半蔵
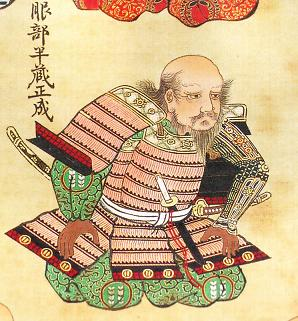

Leader of Iga Ninja
- In office 1557–1597
- Preceded by: Hattori Yasunaga
- Succeeded by: Hattori Masanari

Personal details
- Born: Hattori Masanari (服部 正成) c. 1542 Mikawa Province (now Iga-chō, Okazaki, Aichi)
- Died: January 2, 1597 (aged 54–55) Edo, Musashi province
- Relations: Hattori Yasunaga, 1st-Hanzō (father); Hattori Masanari, 3rd-Hanzō (son)
- Nickname: Oni no Hanzō (Demon Hanzō)

Military service
- Allegiance: Matsudaira clan Tokugawa clan
- Battles/wars: Attack on Udo Castle; Siege of Kaminogō Castle; Siege of Kakegawa; Battle of Anegawa; Battle of Mikatagahara; Tenshō-Jingo war; Battle of Komaki and Nagakute; Siege of Odawara

Hattori Hanzō (服部 半蔵; c. 1542 – January 2, 1597) or Second Hanzō, nicknamed Oni no Hanzō (鬼の半蔵, Demon Hanzō), was a samurai of the Sengoku era. He served the Tokugawa clan as a general and is credited with saving the life of Tokugawa Ieyasu, later helping him to become the ruler of united Japan.

Hanzō was known as an expert tactician and a master of sword fighting, and was included in cultural sobriquet as one of Tokugawa's 16 divine generals (Tokugawa jūrokushinshō). He became known as the Second Hanzō. He later earned the nickname Oni no Hanzō (鬼の半蔵, Demon Hanzō) to distinguish him from another Tokugawa general, Watanabe Hanzō (Watanabe Moritsuna), who is nicknamed Yari no Hanzō (槍の半蔵, Spear Hanzō). Hanzō is often depicted in popular culture as a master ninja or swordsmith.

== Biography ==
Hattori Hanzō was born the son of Hattori Yasunaga (服部 保長), the First Hanzō, a minor samurai in the service of the Matsudaira (later Tokugawa) clan. His real name was Hattori Masanari (服部 正成). Despite being born in Mikawa Province (now Iga-chō, Okazaki, Aichi), he often paid visits to Iga Province, home of the Hattori clan. At the age of 15, his first battle was a nighttime attack during the siege of Uto castle in 1557.

In 1561, Hanzō served Tokugawa Ieyasu (who at the time was still called Matsudaira Motoyasu) and greatly contributed to Ieyasu's rise to power, helping the future shogun bring down the Imagawa clan. After Imagawa Ujizane had held Tokugawa's wife and son as hostages, Hanzō made a successful hostage rescue of Tokugawa's family at Kaminogo castle in 1562.

In 1563, a major incident occurred which involved Hanzō. The Ikkō-ikki followers had rebelled in Mikawa and fought against Ieyasu. Moreover, the majority of the Tokugawa clan's vassals were followers of the Ikko sect. Honda Masanobu and most of the vassals joined the Ikko Ikki and began to take hostile action against Ieyasu. During that time, Hanzō, who was also a follower of the Ikkō-ikki, instead kept his loyalty to the Tokugawa clan and supported Ieyasu to fight the rebels.

In 1569, Hanzō went on to lay siege to Kakegawa castle against the Imagawa clan.

From 1570 to 1573, Hanzō served with distinction at the battles of Anegawa and Mikatagahara respectively; it was during this conflict that Hanzō received the nickname Oni no Hanzō. According to the Kansei Chōshū Shokafu (Note: a genealogy of major samurai completed in 1812 by the Tokugawa shogunate), Hattori Hanzō rendered meritorious service during the Battle of Mikatagahara and became commander of an Iga unit consisting of one hundred fifty men. He captured a Takeda spy named Chikuan, and when Takeda's troops invaded Totomi, Hanzō counterattacked with only thirty warriors at the Tenryū River. He and Watanabe Moritsuna performed with exceptional skill with their spears. This prompting Moritsuna to gain a nickname of Yari no Hanzō (Spear Hanzō) while Hanzō being nicknamed as Oni no Hanzō, (Hanzō the demon).

In 1575, he married the daughter of fellow military commander Nagasaka Nobumasa. His son would be born around a year later.

In 1579, after Matsudaira Nobuyasu was accused of treason and conspiracy by Oda Nobunaga and was ordered to commit seppuku by his own father, Ieyasu, Hanzō was called in to act as an official to assist the seppuku procession, but he refused to take the sword on the blood of his own lord. Ieyasu valued his loyalty after hearing of Hanzō's ordeal and was noted to have said "Even a demon can shed tears".

In 1580, another incident involving Hanzō and the Hattori clan occurred. During that time, a military commander of the Oda clan was staying in Hamamatsu Castle in preparation to assist the Oda-Tokugawa alliance to attack Takatenjin Castle, which belonged to the Takeda clan's forces. However, a friction happened between the commander of the castle with a Tokugawa retainer over a trivial matter. Hanzō was trying to resolve the matter. However, the Ōgaki clan's retainers who were on the side of the castle commander attacked Hanzō, which caused the members of Hattori clan to fight them back, resulting in casualties on both sides. As a result of this incident, the Ōgaki clan demanded Hanzō to be held responsible and executed. Ieyasu then managed to trick the Oda clan by pretending to arrest Hanzō at first. Ieyasu then allowed Hanzō to escape from his prison in Hamamatsu castle along with his wife and children. After that, Ieyasu deceived the Ōgaki clan by presenting them with a head of someone else, while claiming it was Hanzō's head.

=== Journey through Iga province ===
In the middle of June 1582, after the Honnō-ji incident, Tokugawa Ieyasu escaped from Sakai to return into Mikawa, in order to prevent capture from Akechi Mitsuhide and his troops. Ieyasu had only 34 companions with him, including Hanzō. The journey they took was particularly dangerous due to the existence of Ochimusha-gari, or "samurai hunting" gangs (Note: During the Sengoku period, particularly dangerous groups called Ochimusha-gari or "fallen warrior hunter" groups had emerged. These groups consisted of peasants or rōnin who were dispossessed by war and now formed self-defense forces which operated outside the law, while in reality they often resorted to hunting and robbing defeated samurai or soldiers during conflicts. These outlaw groups were particularly rampant on the route which Ieyasu took to return to Mikawa.). Ieyasu and his party, therefore, chose the shortest route back to the Mikawa Province by crossing through the Iga Province, which differed in many versions according to primary sources such as the records of Tokugawa Nikki or Mikawa Todai-Hon:

- The Tokugawa Nikki theory stated that Ieyasu took the roads to Shijonawate and Son'enji, then followed the Kizu stream until they spent a night in Yamaguchi castle. The next day, they reached a stronghold of the Kōka ikki clan of Tarao who allowed them to take refuge for the night. Then in the last day, Ieyasu's group used a ship from Shiroko to reach Okazaki Castle. However, The Tokugawa Nikki theory is doubted by modern historians, since it was not actually the shortest route for Ieyasu to reach Mikawa from his starting position at Sakai, while on the other hand, it was also considered a very risky path due to the existence of Iga ikki clans which were hostile to the Oda and Tokugawa clans.
- The Mikawa Toda-Hon stated that Ieyasu went north from Ogawadate, crossed Koka, and entered Seishu Seki from Shigaraki, passed through Aburahi and entered Tsuge in Iga. This theory was championed by modern Japanese historians such as Tatsuo Fujita from Mie University, who had expressed doubts about the credibility of the story regarding Hattori Hanzō's ninja helping Ieyasu, given that the story does not appear until the 18th century during the rule of Tokugawa Yoshimune. Some people claiming to be descendants of Kōka ikki clans also supported this route theory, and before they reached Kada pass where they could be escorted by the Kōka clan Jizamurai, Ieyasu mostly depended on his high-rank vassals for his protection, particularly the four Shitennō generals, rather than the popular theory about the help of "Iga ninja" clans.

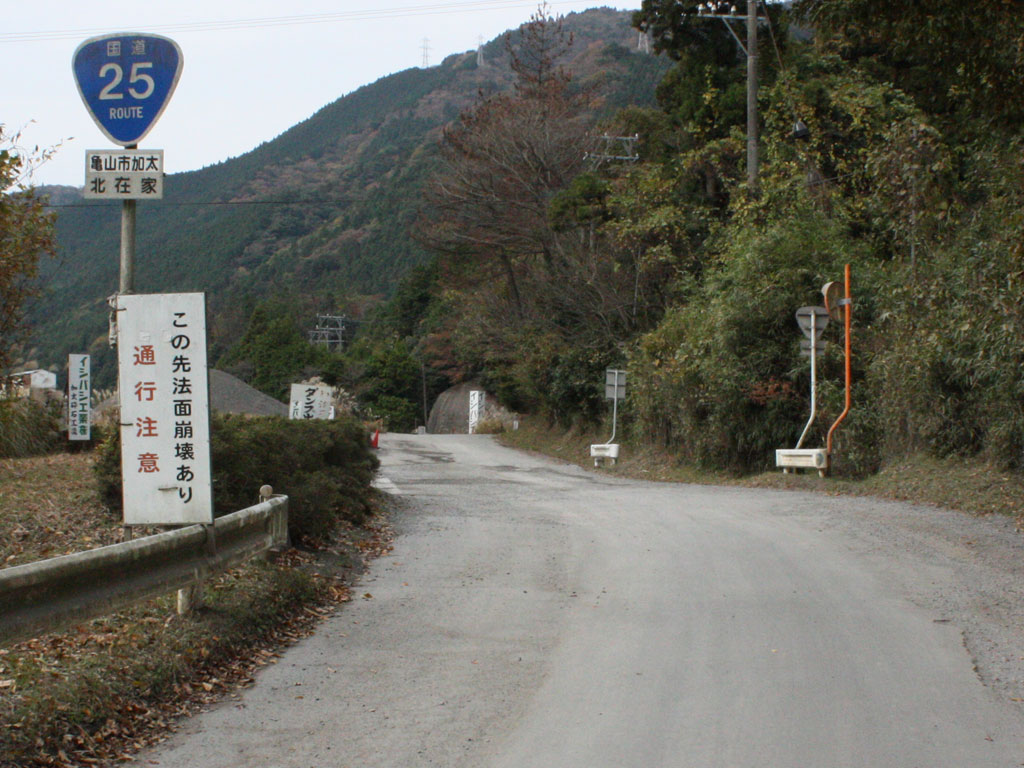
Kada Pass, believed to be the road taken by Tokugawa Ieyasu to return to Mikawa

Regardless of which theory is true, historians agreed that the trek ended at Kada (a mountain pass between Kameyama town and Iga). Tokugawa's group suffered a last attack by the 'ochimusha-gari outlaws at Kada pass where they reached the territory of the Kōka ikki clan of Jizamurai who were friendly to the Tokugawa clan. The Koka ikki samurai assisted Ieyasu to eliminate the threats of raiders and escorted them until they reached Iga Province, where they were further protected by other allied clans from Iga ikki which accompanied the Ieyasu group until they safely reached Mikawa.

Portuguese missionary Luís Fróis had recorded in his work History of Japan, that during this journey, Tokugawa retainers such as Sakai Tadatsugu, Ii Naomasa, Honda Tadakatsu, Sakakibara Yasumasa, and many others fought their way out against the raids and harassments of ochimusha-gari outlaws during their march escorting Ieyasu, while sometimes also paying bribes of gold and silver to those which they could negotiate with. Matsudaira Ietada recorded in his journal, Ietada nikki (家忠日記), that the escorts of Ieyasu had suffered around 200 casualties during their journey due to the raids from bandits and outlaws.

=== Further service under Tokugawa clan ===
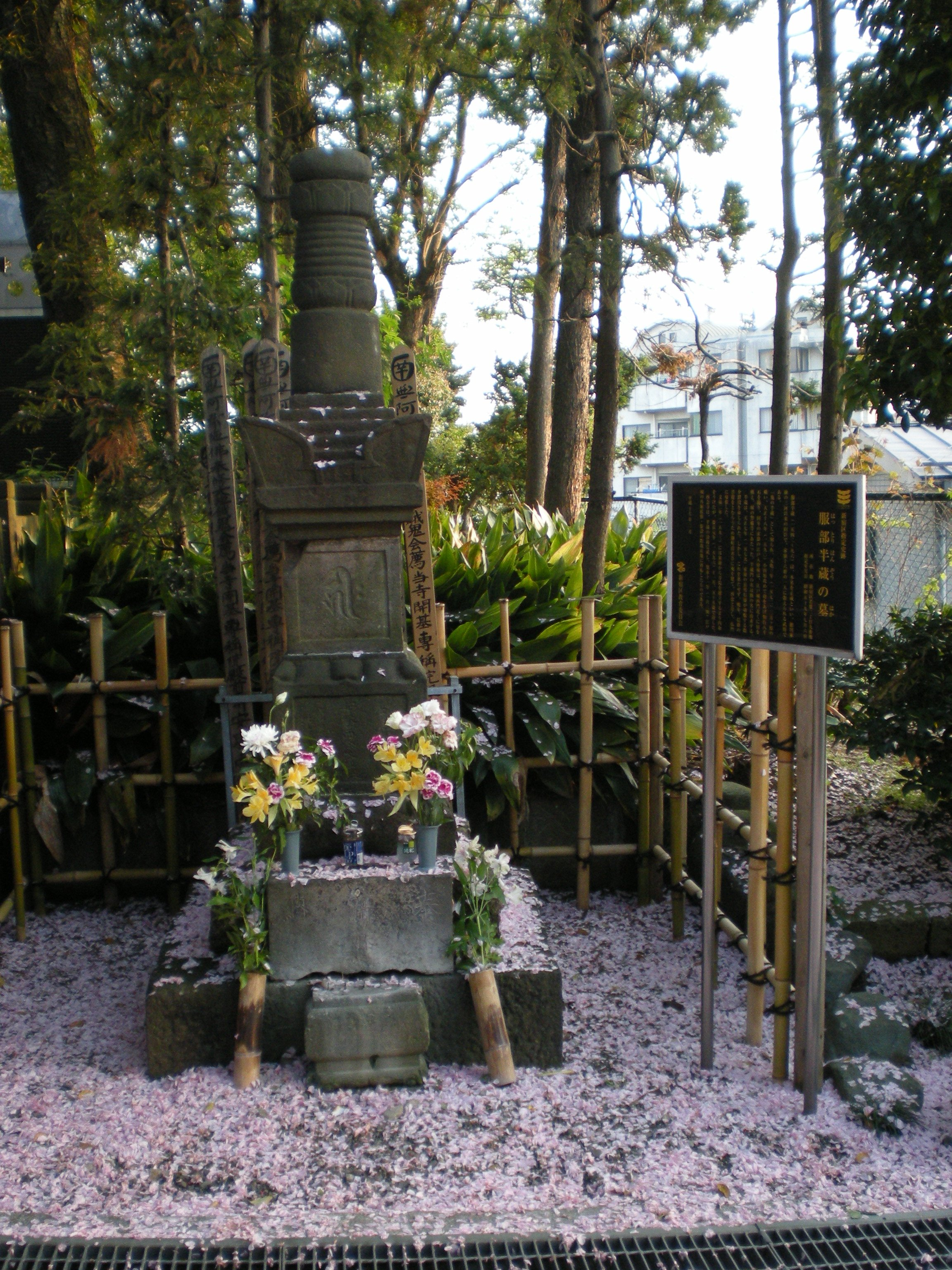
Grave of Hattori Hanzō at Sainen-ji temple in Shinjuku Ward

According to Iga's history book (伊賀者由緒書) compiled during the Edo period, the Iga clan ninja which Hanzō hailed from never missed a single battle which involved the Tokugawa clan, from the Battle of Izu Nirayama in 1582, to the Summer Siege of Osaka in 1615.

In late June 1582, a triangle conflict which was dubbed as the Tenshō-Jingo war broke out between the Tokugawa clan, Uesugi clan, and Hōjō clan. (Note: The name of "Tenshō-Jingo War" was coined by Tashiro Takashi in 1980. Furthermore, there is also a theory that from the perspective of local powers which continued to fight over the possession of the Oda clan's leftover territories, there is evidence that Tokugawa Ieyasu's transfer to the Kantō region following the fall of the Hōjō clan in 1590 and the placement of Toyotomi-line daimyo, until transfer of Uesugi Kagekatsu to Aizu, where the local daimyo were separated from their former territory and the establishment of control by the Azuchi–Momoyama period, was considered to be the extension of this conflict.) Hanzō participated in this conflict on the side of Tokugawa Ieyasu as he deployed his forces in various forts in the Kōfu basin against Ujinao, who camped his army in the area of present-day Hokuto city. Hanzō led the Iga clan warriors to Katsuyama castle (Kamisone-cho, Kofu city), Misakuchi castle, and Kotohirayama castle (Misakuchi-cho, Kofu city), where he monitored the Nakamichi road connecting Kai and Suruga. At the same time, a Tokugawa army detachment from the Iga Province commanded by Hanzō invaded Saku District, where they were also aided by Shinano local samurai warriors from the Tsugane clan led by Ōbi Sukemitsu. In early September, Hanzō and Sukemitsu launched a night attack on Egusuku castle (also known as Shishiku castle) and successfully captured it, under the cover of heavy rain. Later, he also took the Sanogoya castle in Izu Province under cover of heavy rain. Hanzō was praised by Ieyasu for this achievement.

In 1584, Hattori Hanzō continued to serve Ieyasu at the Battle of Komaki and Nagakute. During this battle, Hanzō marched to Ise commanding 100 warriors of Iga and Kōka ninja as reinforcements from Matsugashima Castle. His troops used rifles in defending the castle from the attacking Toyotomi forces. However, within a month, Takigawa Katsutoshi, the lord of Matsugashima Castle, was cornered to the Ninomaru (second bailey of the castle). In the end, the castle fell to the Toyotomi force.

In 1590, Hattori Hanzō participated in the Odawara campaign, where he led a troop of 50 members of Negoro-shū, a group of mercenaries using firearms that originated in Kii Province. After this conflict, for his service in helping Ieyasu crossing of Iga, Hanzō was awarded with 8,000 koku of domain in Totomi Province (present-day Shizuoka Prefecture). By the time Ieyasu relocated to Kantō region, Hanzō was given the command of yoriki officers and 200 civil officials.

In 1597, Hanzō died on 2 January, succumbing to an unspecified illness. (Note: On the native Japanese lunar calendar that was used at the time, his death was marked as 慶長元年11月14日, or the 14th day of the 11th month of the Keichō era, which corresponds to 2 January 1597 AD on the modern Gregorian calendar. Confusingly, the Kansei Chōshū Shokafu recorded his date of death as 4 November 1596, which differs from the Hattori family tradition and the gravestone at the Sainen-ji temple). A fictional account of his death is that while he was pursuing Fūma Kotarō in the Seto Inland Sea, he fell into Kotarō's trap. Kotarō succeeded in luring him into a small channel and a tide trapped the Tokugawa fleet. Then, Kotarō and his men set fire in the channel using oil.

== Weapons and armaments ==
Hanzō's remains now rest in the Sainen-ji temple cemetery in Yotsuya, Tokyo. The temple also holds his favourite yari (Japanese spear) and ceremonial battle helmet.

The spear's blade is in the ryō-shinogi zukuri style, and is now a completely rusted reddish-brown, with the steel no longer visible. The tip broke off in the 1855 Edo earthquake. The wooden handle is black-lacquered, fitted with a copper tube at the base, wrapped in sandalwood, lacquered, and secured with two copper bands. It was originally 14 shaku (424 cm) long, 7.5 kg in weight, but was damaged during the bombing of Tokyo in 1945. This spear is traditionally said to have been awarded by Ieyasu to Hanzō for his valor at the Battle of Mikatagahara (1573). It was later donated to the Sainen-ji temple (founded by Hanzō to honor Ieyasu's eldest son, Matsudaira Nobuyasu, who was ordered to commit seppuku) by Hanzō's descendants in the late Edo period.

Another of Hanzō's spears was recorded being passed down to Ōtani Masazumi, a vassal of Sakai Tadanao Shuri-no-daibu. The blade length is 3 shaku and 7 sun (approx. 111.8 cm), while the groove (hi) depth is medium, approximately 3 bu (about 9 mm).

== Legacy ==
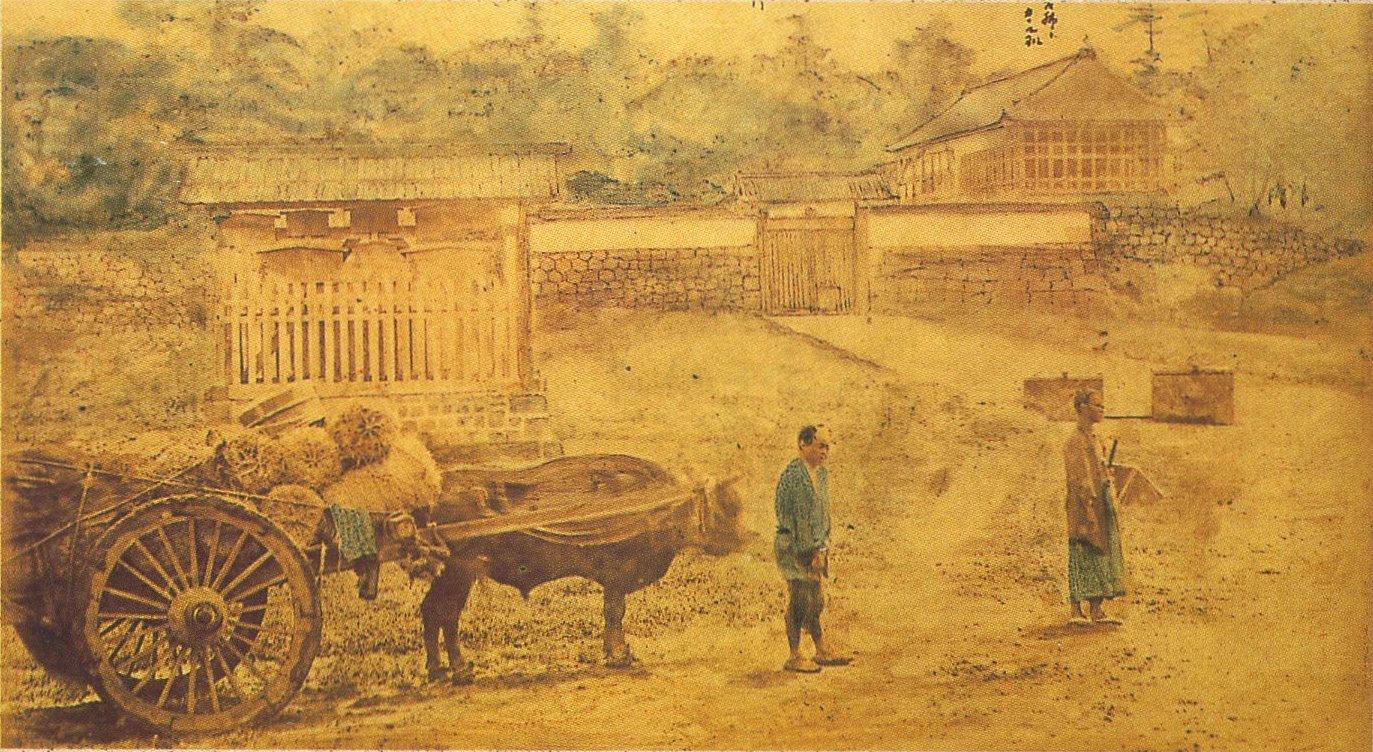
Edo Castle's Hanzōmon gate during the Meiji period (1868–1912)

Hanzō's reputation as a samurai leader who commanded a 200-men strong unit of Iga warriors has grown to legendary proportions. Tales of Hattori's exploits often attributed various supernatural abilities, such as teleportation, psychokinesis, and precognition.

After his death in 1597, Hattori Hanzō was succeeded by his son, whose name was also Masanari (third Hanzō), though written with different kanji (正就 instead of 正成). He was given the title Iwami no Kami (石見守) and his Iga men would act as guards of Edo Castle, the headquarters of the government of united Japan. "Hanzō" is actually a name passed down through the leaders of the Hattori family, meaning his father was also called Hanzō and so was his successor. Indeed, there were at least five people known as Hattori Hanzō throughout history.

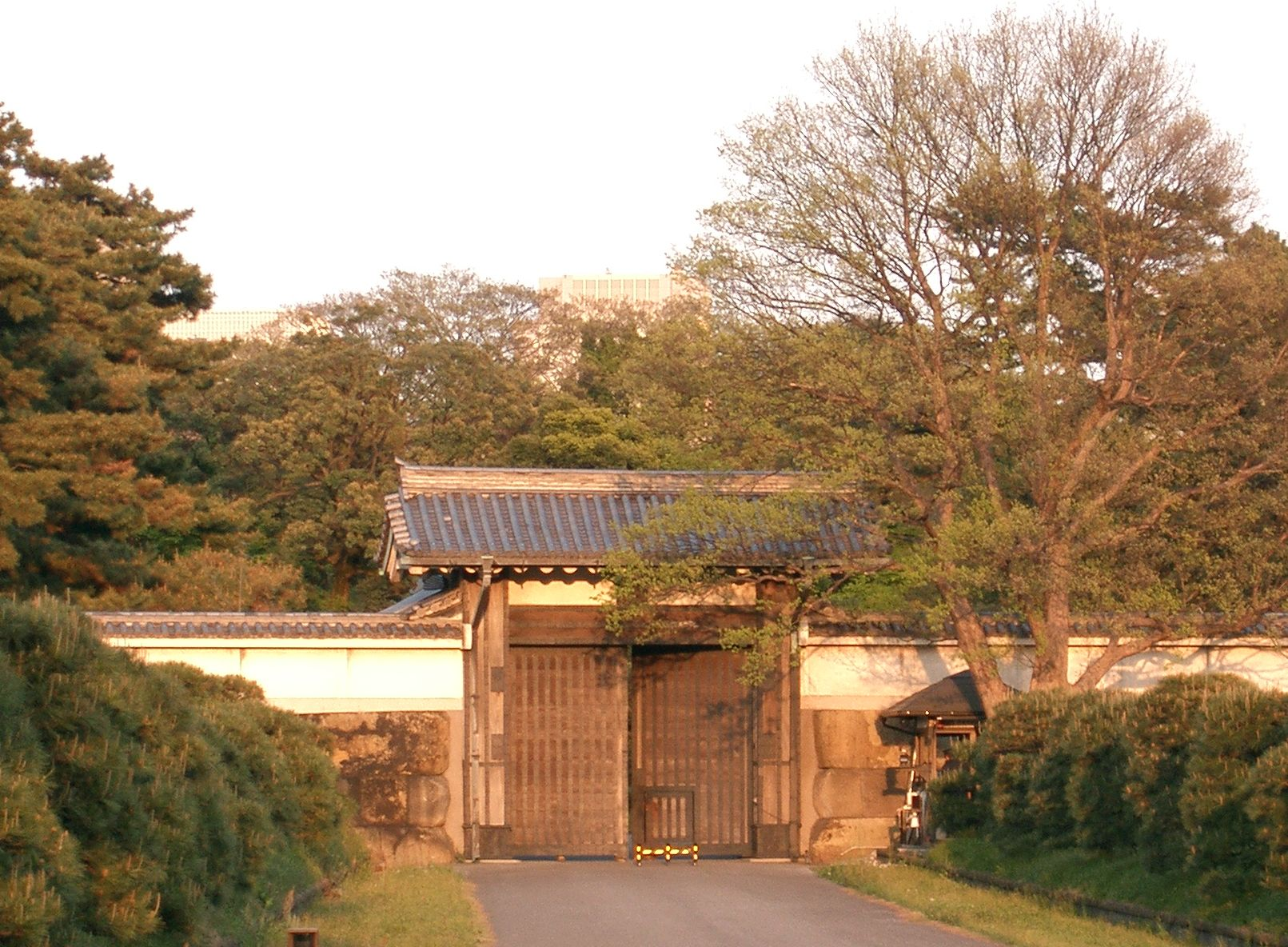
The Tokyo Imperial Palace's Hanzōmon gate in 2007

To this day, artefacts of Hanzō's legacy remain. Tokyo Imperial Palace (formerly the shōgun's palace) still has a gate called Hanzō's Gate (Hanzōmon), and the Hanzōmon subway line which runs from Hanzōmon Station in central Tokyo to the southwestern suburbs is named after the gate, where his house was once located. The neighbourhood outside Hanzō's Gate is known as Wakaba, but before 1943 was named Iga-chō ("Iga Town").

=== Popular culture ===
Despite historically having been a vassal of Tokugawa Ieyasu, Hanzō is more widely known in the modern era as an archetypical ninja figure, and appears in many fictional works. However, Hanzō was not featured in the first ninja boom of the Taishō era (1912–1926), which was dominated by characters such as Sarutobi Sasuke and Kirigakure Saizō. Hanzō started to gain his reputation as a legendary ninja in fictional works in the 1950s in various mediums such as novels, manga, anime, Japanese television drama, movies, and Japanese theatre. Important works in the process of creating the "Ninja Hattori Hanzō" myth include Renzaburō Shibata's Akai Kageboshi (1960) and Futaro Yamada's short story "Ninja Hattori Hanzō" (1964). The former portrays Hanzō as a central character who is deeply involved with the protagonist and appears throughout the story. The latter reinvents "Hattori Hanzō" as a name that is passed down, rather than referring to a specific person. Quentin Tarantino's 2003 film Kill Bill also contributed to his status as a legendary swordsmith.

== See also ==
- Fūma Kotarō

== Bibliography ==
- Hirayama, Masaru (2011), 武田遺領をめぐる動乱と秀吉の野望 [Takeda's Territory and Hideyoshi's Ambitions], 戎光祥出版, ISBN 978-4-86403-035-9
- Hirayama, Masaru (2024). 小牧・長久手合戦 秀吉と家康、天下分け目の真相 [The Battle of Komaki and Nagakute: Hideyoshi and Ieyasu] (in Japanese) (増補改訂版 ed.). KADOKAWA. ISBN 978-4040824949.
- Harada Kazutoshi (2009). Art of the Samurai Japanese Arms and Armor, 1156-1868. Metropolitan Museum of Art (New York, N.Y.). ISBN 9781588393456.
- コロコロさん (2021). "「服部半蔵正成」伊賀随一の忍者にして徳川家臣！？" ["Hattori Hanzō Masanari" Iga's greatest ninja and Tokugawa retainer!?]. 戦国ヒストリーのサイトロゴ (in Japanese). sengoku-his.com. containing references from:
  - Kudo Akioki, "Tokugawa Ieyasu and the Warring States Period: Ieyasu's Agent, Hattori Hanzō Masanari", 2015 (工藤章興 「〈徳川家康と戦国時代〉家康のエージェント 服部半蔵正成」 2015年)
  - Yamakita Atsushi, "Illustrated Ninja", Shinkigensha, 2015 (山北篤『図解 忍者』 新紀元社 2015年)
  - Kubo Fumitake, "Iga History: A Study", Iga Local History Research Association, 1986 (久保文武 『伊賀史叢考』 伊賀郷土史研究会 1986年)
  - Mie Prefecture website, "Historical Information Storehouse: Hattori Hanzō and Ieyasu" (三重県HP 「歴史の情報蔵 服部半蔵と家康」)
  - Shinjuku Ward website, "The Origin of the Name Hanzomon Gate – Hattori Hanzō and the Iga Police Officers" (新宿区HP 「半蔵門の名前の由来ー服部半蔵と伊賀同心ー」)
