= Sakakibara Yasumasa =

Japanese samurai and daimyō

- 榊原 康政

Lord of Tatebayashi
- In office 1590–1606
- Succeeded by: Sakakibara Yasukatsu

Personal details
- Born: 1548 Mikawa Province, Japan
- Died: June 19, 1606 (aged 57–58) Edo, Japan

Military service
- Allegiance: Sakakibara clan Matsudaira clan Tokugawa clan
- Rank: Rōjū; Buke Shitsuyaku
- Commands: Tatebayashi Domain
- Battles/wars: Battle of Azukizaka (1564); Battle of Anegawa (1570); Campaign against Takeda clan (1576-1581); Battle of Mikatagahara; Siege of Nagashino castle; Siege of Komyo castle; Battle of Nagashino; Siege of Suwahara castle; Siege of Takatenjin (1581); Battle of Tanaka castle (1581); Journey in Iga; Tenshō-Jingo War (1582); Battle of Kurokoma; Tokugawa-Toyotomi conflict (1584); Battle of Haguro; Siege of Shimojima castle; Siege of Kanie castle; Siege of Odawara (1590); Kunohe rebellion (1591); Sekigahara Campaign (1600); Siege of Ueda

Sakakibara Yasumasa (榊原 康政; 1548 – June 19, 1606) was a Japanese samurai and daimyō of the late Sengoku period through early Edo period, who served the Tokugawa clan.

As one of the Tokugawa family's foremost military commanders, he was considered one of its "Four Guardian Kings" (shitennō 四天王) along with Sakai Tadatsugu, Honda Tadakatsu and Ii Naomasa. One of his most notable military accomplishments occurred during the Battle of Anegawa when he changed the tide of the battle with a flanking maneuver. He is also famous for conquering many Takeda clan castles in Tōtōmi Province from 1574-1579.

His court title during Toyotomi Hideyoshi's government was Shikibu-Shō (式部大輔). During Tokugawa shogunate, he was appointed as Rōjū, or elder councilor.

== Early life ==
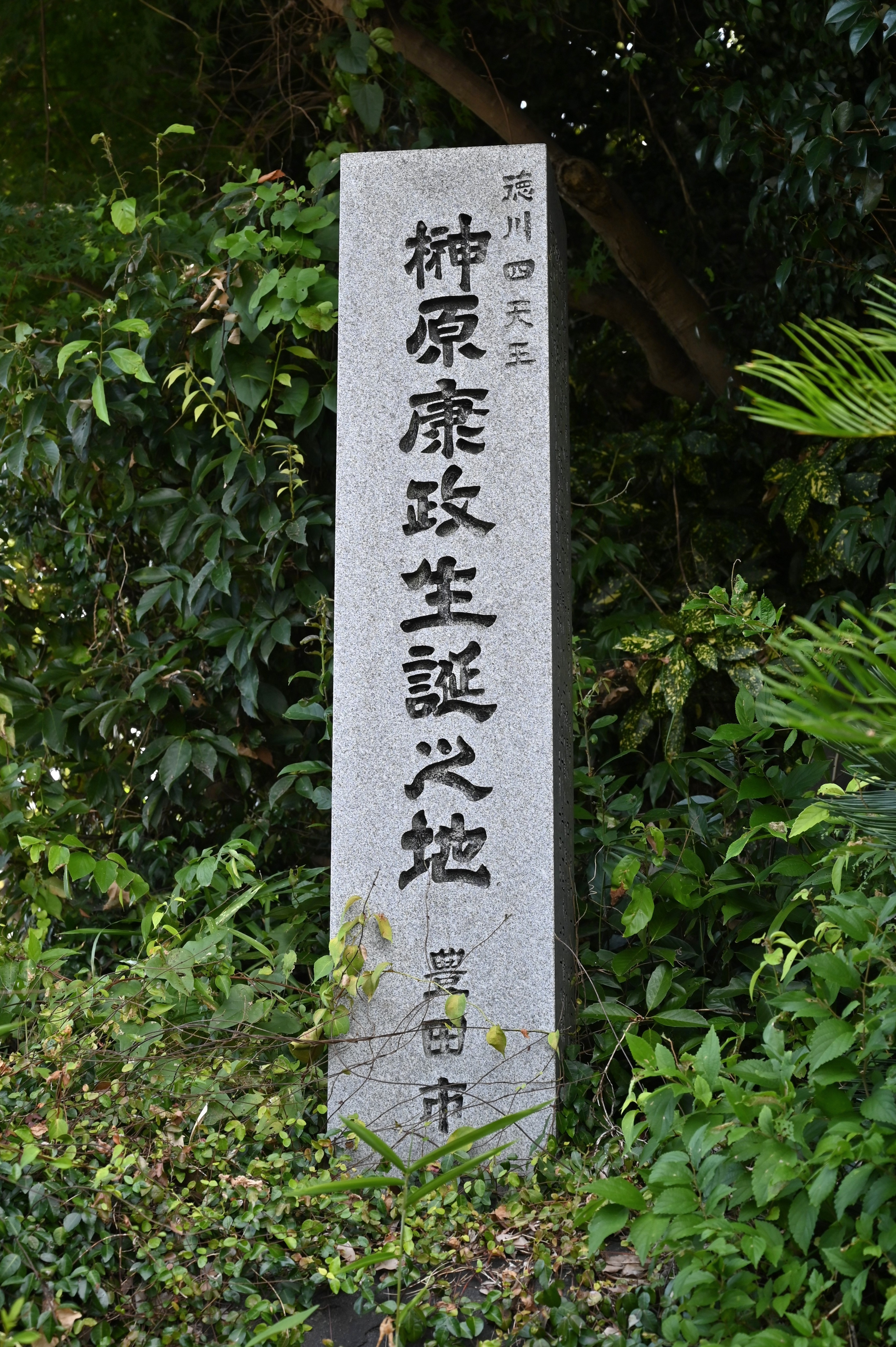
The birthplace of Yasumasa Sakakibara Toyota City, Aichi Prefecture

Sakakibara Yasumasa was born in the year Tenmon-17 (1548), the second son of Sakakibara Nagamasa, in the Ueno district of Mikawa Province. The Sakakibara clan branch from which Yasumasa hailed, traditionally served the Sakai clan, a fudai clan whose lord was Sakai Tadanao, who was in turn a vassal of the Matsudaira clan. This classified the Sakaibara as baishin, or "rear vassals."

The young Yasumasa interacted with Matsudaira Motoyasu (later Tokugawa Ieyasu) often from a young age and was soon appointed as his page. Due to his valor at the Battle of Batogahara in 1564 against the Ikkō-ikki rebels in Mikawa, he was allowed to use the "yasu" from Motoyasu's name. From then on, he would use "Yasumasa" as his name.

In Eiroku-9 (1566), at age 19, Yasumasa had reached adulthood, and soon after, he and Honda Tadakatsu were appointed as hatamoto and each granted the command of 50 cavalrymen. From that point on, they would function as Ieyasu's unit commanders.

In 1568. Ieyasu was eager to expand eastward to Tōtōmi Province. Ieyasu and Takeda Shingen, the head of the Takeda clan in Kai Province, made an alliance for the purpose of conquering all the Imagawa territory. However, on January 8, 1569, the Takeda vassal Akiyama Nobutomo invaded the Tōtōmi province from Shinano Province. The Takeda clan, through Oda Nobunaga, with whom they had a friendly relationship, asked Ieyasu, who was Nobunaga's ally, to reconsider cooperation with the Takeda, but Ieyasu rejected the idea, and Ieyasu is considered to have been in a position of independence from Nobunaga to a certain extent. However, until around April of the first year of the Genki era, diplomatic negotiations were being conducted between Yasumasa and Tsuchiya Masatsugu, who acted as intermediaries between the two sides.

In 1570, Yasumasa fought at the Battle of Anegawa, he was in the second division, along with Honda Tadakatsu, who fought the Asakura Kagetake's left flank. After Tokugawa force was done dealing with Asakura force, they immediately dispatch Yasumasa and Honda Tadakatsu troops to assist Oda's forces who still struggling against the Azai army. Yasumasa and Tadakatsu struck the right flank of Azai Nagamasa's force, while subsequently followed with Inaba Yoshimichi on their track to flank Azai clan's left column, causing the Azai clan forces pushed back.

Later in 1573, He fought at the Battle of Mikatagahara, where he works together with Honda Tadakatsu fighting against a Takeda clan detachment led by Oyamada Masayuki, while Ishikawa Kazumasa covering the retreat of Ieyasu from the battle. Later in the same year Yasumasa and Honda Tadakatsu were tasked to capture the Nagashino Castle. Both of them manage subdue the castle from the Takeda clan. For the rest of the year service, he competed with Tadakatsu in capturing many of Takeda clan castles.

In 1575, During the conflict between Oda-Tokugawa alliance against Takeda Katsuyori, when the latter invaded Enshū province, Yasumasa and Honda Tadakatsu fought against Katsuyori, where they captured the Komyo castle in June. Later, Yasumasa also participate in the Battle of Nagashino when Oda-Tokugawa forces claimed victory against Katsuyori. Immediately after the Nagashino battle, he and Tadakatsu captured the Suwahara Castle, and was awarded by Ieyasu a famous sword which crafted by Takagi Sadamune. In July, Yasumasa and Osuga Yasutaka besieged the Koyama castle.

Later in 1581, Yasumasa stormed Tanaka castle which guarded by Takeda clan general named Ichijō Nobutatsu. In this battle, Yasumasa fought together with Matsudaira Ietada, Ii Naomasa, and Honda Tadakatsu, where they all managed to climb Tanaka castle wall and fought Nobutatsu's soldiers.

== As head of Sakakibara clan ==
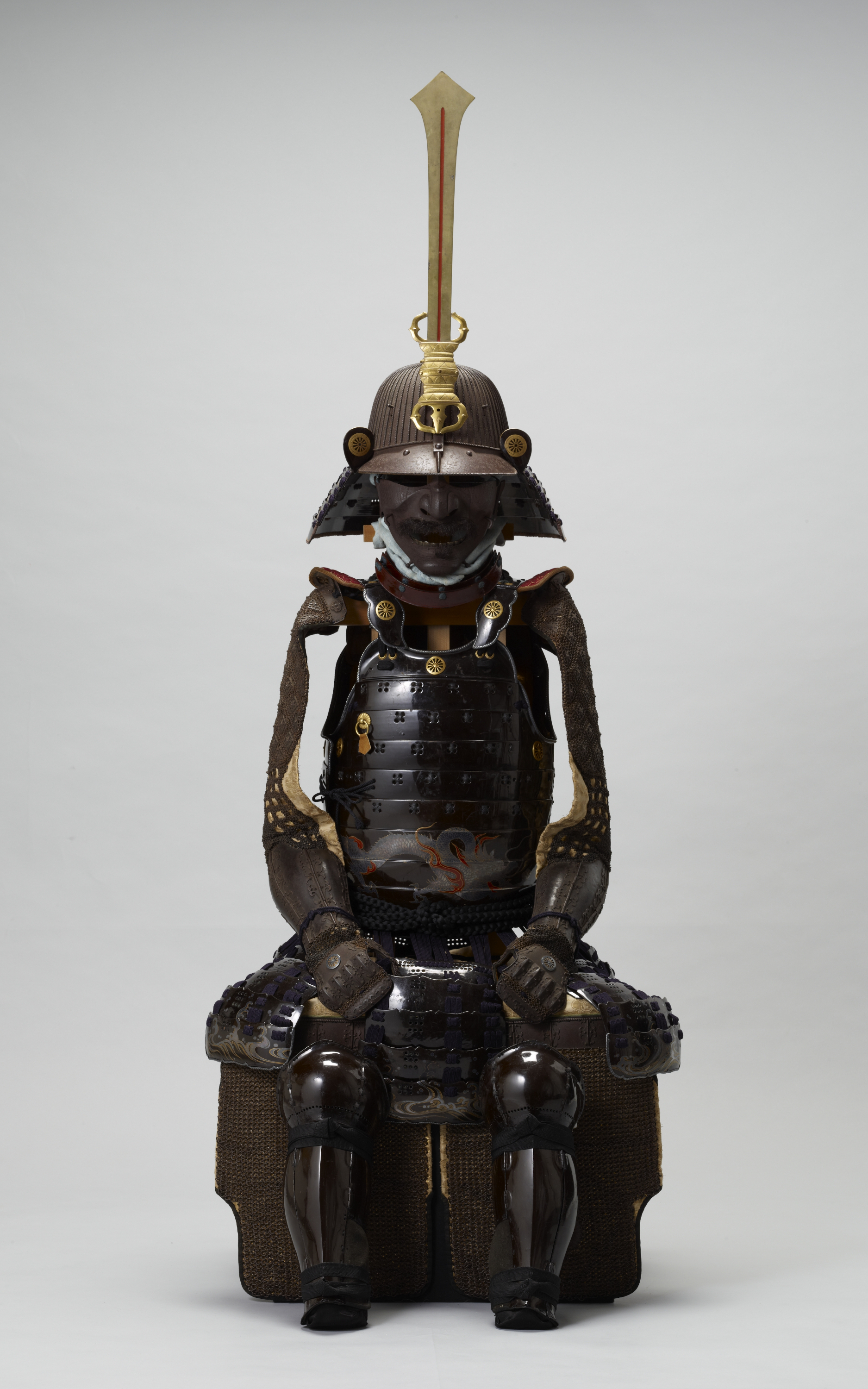
Sakakibara Yasumasa's Gusoku Style Armor

In 1579, Yasumasa was appointed to be the head of Sakakibara clan, succeeding his older brother, Sakakibara Kiyomasa. Kiyomasa decided to retire from his position after the incident of Matsudaira Nobuyasu who ordered to commit seppuku for treason accusation. Before his ascension to lead the Sakakibara clan, historical recorded the Yasumasa only commanded very few of Samurai warriors under him, with only one clan has been identified, which is the Takeo clan. (Note: Takeo clan reportedly never promoted into senior rank throughout the Edo period.)

In 1581, Yasumasa participated in the Tokugawa army attack on Tanaka castle which guarded by Takeda clan general named Ichijō Nobutatsu. In this battle, Yasumasa, Matsudaira Ietada, Honda Tadakatsu, and Ii Naomasa, as they all climbed Tanaka castle wall and fought Nobutatsu's soldiers inside. In the same year, he also participated in the Siege of Takatenjin castle, where he took 41 enemy heads in combat.

In 1582, after the Honnō-ji Incident, Yasumasa accompanied Ieyasu in an arduous journey to escape the enemies of Nobunaga in Sakai and returning to Mikawa. However, their journey was very dangerous due to the existence of "Ochimusha-gari" groups across the route. (Note: According to Imatani Akira, professor of Tsuru University, and Ishikawa Tadashi, assistant professor University of Central Florida, during Sengoku period there are emergence of particularly dangerous groups called "Ochimusha-gari" or "fallen warrior hunt" groups. These groups were decentralized peasant or Rōnin self-defense forces who operates outside the law, while in reality they often resorted to hunt samurai or soldiers who has been defeated in wars.) The Ietada nikki journal has recorded that the escorts of Ieyasu has suffered around 200 casualties and only 34 person left when they finally arrived at Ietada residence in Mikawa.

Later in the same year, the Tenshō-Jingo war broke out between the Tokugawa clan and Hōjō clan in a contest to gain control of Shinano Province, Ueno region, and Kai Province Kai Province (currently Gunma Prefecture), which has been vacant since the destruction of Takeda clan and the death of Oda Nobunaga. Ieyasu lead an army of 8,000 soldiers entering Kai, Shinano Province, and Ueno, to annex it. However, the Hōjō clan in the Kantō region also led an army of 55,000 men and crossed the Usui Pass to invade Shinano Province. During this conflict, Yasumasa once stormed one of a castle belongs to the Hōjō, while Matsudaira Ietada harassing the Hōjō food supplies. Later, in the battle of Kurokoma, Yasumasa fought together with Okabe Motonobu and Mizuno Katsunari to repel the Hōjō army attempt to sneak into the rear of Tokugawa army.

In March of the same year, according to the Meishō genkō-roku record, after the destruction of the war against Hojo clan ended in truce, Ieyasu organized a kishōmon(blood oath) with many samurai clans that formerly were vassals of the Takeda clan assigned under the command of Tokugawa clan retainers. Ieyasu Tokugawa planned to subduct the largest portions of former Takeda samurai under Naomasa's command, having consulted and reached agreement with Sakai Tadatsugu, a senior Tokugawa clan vassal. However, Ieyasu's decision garnered protest from Sakakibara Yasumasa, who went so far as to threaten Naomasa. Tadatsugu immediately defended the decision of Ieyasu in response and warned Yasumasa that if he did any harm to Naomasa, Tadatsugu himself would exact retribution by slaughtering the Sakakibara clan; thus, Yasumasa heeded Tadatsugu and did not protest further. Then Tokugawa decided assigned 70 members of former Takeda samurais from Tsuchiya clan under the command of Ii Naomasa. Meanwhile, Yasumasa himself received the command over 11 former Takeda samurai from Komai clan led by Komai Masanao, who later promoted as Hatamoto retainer of Yasumasa.

== Battle of Komaki-Nagakute ==
In 1584, when Ieyasu chose to defy Toyotomi Hideyoshi, Yasumasa Ieyasu to serve in the campaign of Komaki and Nagakute. Yasumasa suggesting to Ieyasu that the region of Komaki would be suitable for the ensuing campaign. Then as a Toyotomi troops under command of Toyotomi Hidetsugu start entering the area of Komaki, Yasumasa join another Tokugawa general named Osuga Yasutaka to launch a surprise attack against unprepared Hidetsugu, where they inflicting heavy losses to Hidetsugu army. However, Yasumasa and Yasutaka advance were held back by reinforcement forces led by Hori Hidemasa, thus they retreat from the battle.

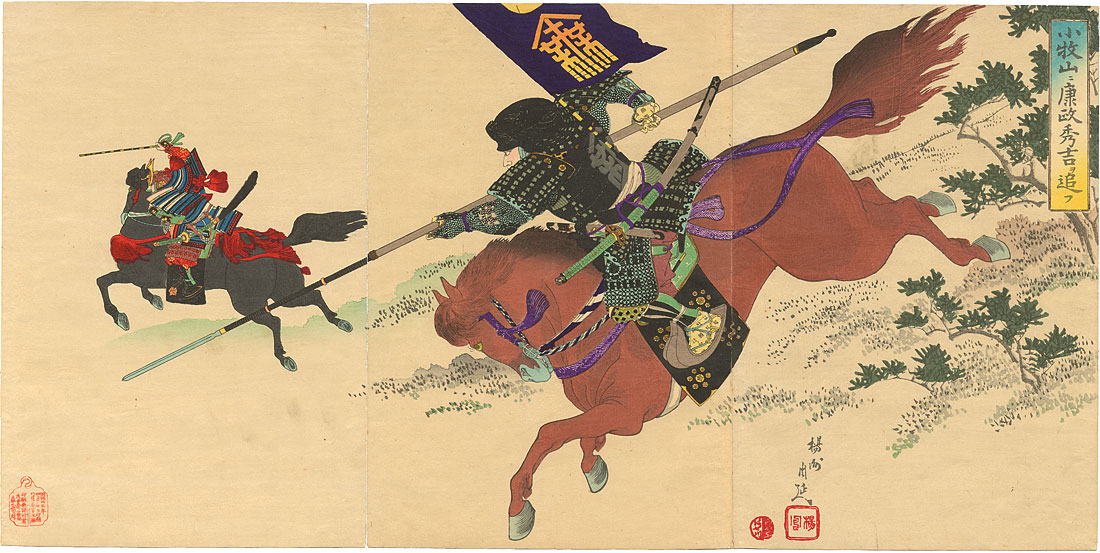
Sakakibara Yasumasa at the Battle of Komaki and Nagakute

In the wake of the victory at Nagakute, Yasumasa circulated a derogatory manifesto proclamations which condemn Hideyoshi's conduct as betrayal towards the will of Oda Nobunaga and also insulting Hideyoshi's origin. This infuriated Hideyoshi, who later promised that he will reward of 100,000 Kan (Japanese gold ingot) to anyone who could bring him the head of Yasumasa. (Note: This story of Yasumasa insulting Hideyoshi was first appeared in a work of Arai Hakuseki. Historian Watanabe Daimon stated that it is difficult to confirm the veracity of this story.)

Later in April, the front line in northern Owari reached stalemate. At this time, Kanie Castle was located about three miles between Ieyasu's Kiyosu Castle and Nobuo's Nagashima Castle, and was connected to the Mie moat and three castles: Ono Castle, Shimojima Castle, and Maeda Castle. At that time, Kanie castle were facing the sea and was one of the leading ports in Owari, along with Atsuta and Tsushima. Then in June 18, Ieyasu and Nobuo led 20,000 soldiers and besieged three castles: Kanie Castle, Maeda Castle, and Shimojima Castle. The Kanie castle were defended by Maeda Nagatane and Takigawa Kazumasu. Tadatsugu, Okanabe Mori, and Yamaguchi Shigemasa spearheading the attack towards Shimojima castle, while Sakakibara Yasumasa, Osuga Yasutaka were deployed to capture any fleeing defenders.

After the fall of Shimojima castle, On June 22, Oda Nobuo and Tokugawa Ieyasu launch an all-out attack on Kanie Castle. The soldiers led by Tadatsugu, who has been deployed at the major entrance, were exhausted after days of fierce fighting, and in the evening, the soldiers of Yasumasa Sakakibara and Ietada Matsudaira entered Kaimonjiguchi in their place. On June 23, Ieyasu entered the castle with Sakakibara Yasumasa, thus the castle were subdued.

== Became famous as Tokugawa-Shitennō ==
On November 13, 1585, Ishikawa Kazumasa, senior vassal of the Tokugawa clan, defected from Ieyasu to Hideyoshi. This incident caused Ieyasu to undertake massive reforms of the structures of Tokugawa clan military government. At first, Ieyasu ordered Torii Mototada, who served as the county magistrate of Kai, to collect military laws, weapons, and military equipment from the time of Takeda Shingen and bring them to Hamamatsu Castle (Hamamatsu City, Shizuoka Prefecture). Later, he also appointed two former Takeda vassals, Naruse Masakazu and Okabe Masatsuna, as magistrates under authority of Ii Naomasa and Honda Tadakatsu, while he also ordered all of former Takeda vassals who now serve him to impart any military doctrines and structures they knew during their service under Takeda clan. Lastly, he ordered the three of his prime generals, the so-called "Tokugawa Four Heavenly Kings," Ii Naomasa, Honda Tadakatsu, and Sakakibara Yasumasa, to serve as supreme commanders of these new military regiments.

In 1586, according to "Sakakibara clan historical records", Ieyasu sent Yasumasa, Honda Tadakatsu, and Ii Naomasa as representatives to Kyoto, where three of them being regarded as "Tokugawa Sanketsu"(Three great nobles of Tokugawa). Then in following month, the three of them joined by Sakai Tadatsugu to accompany Ieyasu in his personal trip to Kyoto, where the four of them became famous as Tokugawa-Shitennō(Tokugawa's Four Guardians". Later, Yasumasa was given the title of "'Shikibu-shō'", when accompanying Ieyasu to Osaka to meet with Hideyoshi.

In 1590, Yasumasa participated in Siege of Odawara, where he led the vanguard troops ambushing Hōjō Ujimasa forces. In the end of this campaign, Ieyasu sent Yasumasa and Ii Naomasa with 1,500 soldiers to witness the Seppuku suicide ritual procession of the defeated enemy generals, Hōjō Ujimasa and Hōjō Ujiteru. Later in the same year, as the Tokugawa moved to the Kantō region following the campaign of Odawara. Shortly after his assignment in Tatebayashi, Ieyasu also assigned Yasumasa as supervisor of administration team which tasked to manage the revenue incomes of Edo domain, which have roughly 1,000,000 kokus. In addition of the sons and son-in-laws of Sakakibara Kiyomasa as part of Yasumasa administration team, Ieyasu also transferred another Tokugawa clan officer named Otsuke to assist the team. Furthermore, Ieyasu viewed Yasumasa needed more manpower to manage vast domains, so he transferred three of other senior retainers Nagashige Nakane, Tanemasa Harada, and Katsushige Murakami to join the administration team.

In 1591, Ieyasu Tokugawa brought Yasumasa, Honda Tadakatsu, and Ii Naomasa to participate in the suppression of Kunohe rebellion.

In 1598, after the death of Hideyoshi Toyotomi, Yasumasa mobilize a Tokugawa army from Kanto and marched to Seta in Ōmi Province on the orders from Ieyasu. This was meant as anticipation against any possible hostility from Ishida Mitsunari. the actual number of Yasumasa's troops was approximately 3,000. However, Yasumasa deliberately spread rumors that his army which came from Kanto were larger by setting up many checkpoints in Seta to control information within the area, while also ordering massive amounts of food supplies which far larger than his factual troops requirement. Those acts of Yasumasa has deceived Mitsunari, as he believed the circulated rumors about huge army from Kanto were coming to Ōmi Province, thus Mitsunari did not dare to order his soldiers to harm Ieyasu.

In 1599, Yasumasa and Ōtani Yoshitsugu, were appointed as inspectors to mediate an incident within Ukita clan, when some of Ukita Hideie vassals incited riots due to internal disputes. In the end, Yasumasa were ordered to leave the matter to Ieyasu himself who successfully reconcile the case and averted the civil war between two faction. However, the aftermath of this incident causing many of Hideie retainers such as Sakazaki Naomori to change their allegiance into the master of Yasumasa, which is Ieyasu Tokugawa. This defections has caused massive setback for the Ukita clan politically and militarily while strengthening Ieyasu.

In 1600, as Ieyasu led a punitive expedition against the Uesugi clan, Yasumasa participated, where he engaged in diplomacy with the local clans at Nasu so they would cooperate with the Tokugawa forces and not siding with the Uesugi. In July 27, Yasumasa sent a letter to Akita Muneki informing him that Ishida Mitsunari and Otani Yoshitsugu had "parted ways," and that Yodo-dono, the three Toyotomi magistrates (Maeda Gen'i, Masuda Nagamori, and Nagatsuka Masaie), and Maeda Toshinaga had requested Ieyasu to come to Kyoto, and that command over the Aizu region had been transferred from Ieyasu to Hidetada. Later, as Ieyasu lead the main forces of Eastern Army to confront Mitsunari in the Battle of Sekigahara, Yasumasa accompanied a detachment forces led by Tokugawa Hidetada for the march along the Nakasendō to besiege Ueda castle. In the aftermath of Sekigahara victory of the Eastern Army led by Ieyasu, Hidetada incurred the wrath of Ieyasu due to Hidetada's tardiness to arrive and participate in the main battle, due to the Siege of Ueda castle being dragged too long. However, Yasumasa was said being able to mediate the situation and convinced Ieyasu to give pardon for his son. After the war, Ieyasu offered Yasumasa 250,000 koku of Mito Domain, but Yasumasa declined the offer, so instead Yasumasa was given the control of Tatebayashi Domain worth 100,000 koku, following the Tokugawa victory at the Battle of Sekigahara.

== Death ==
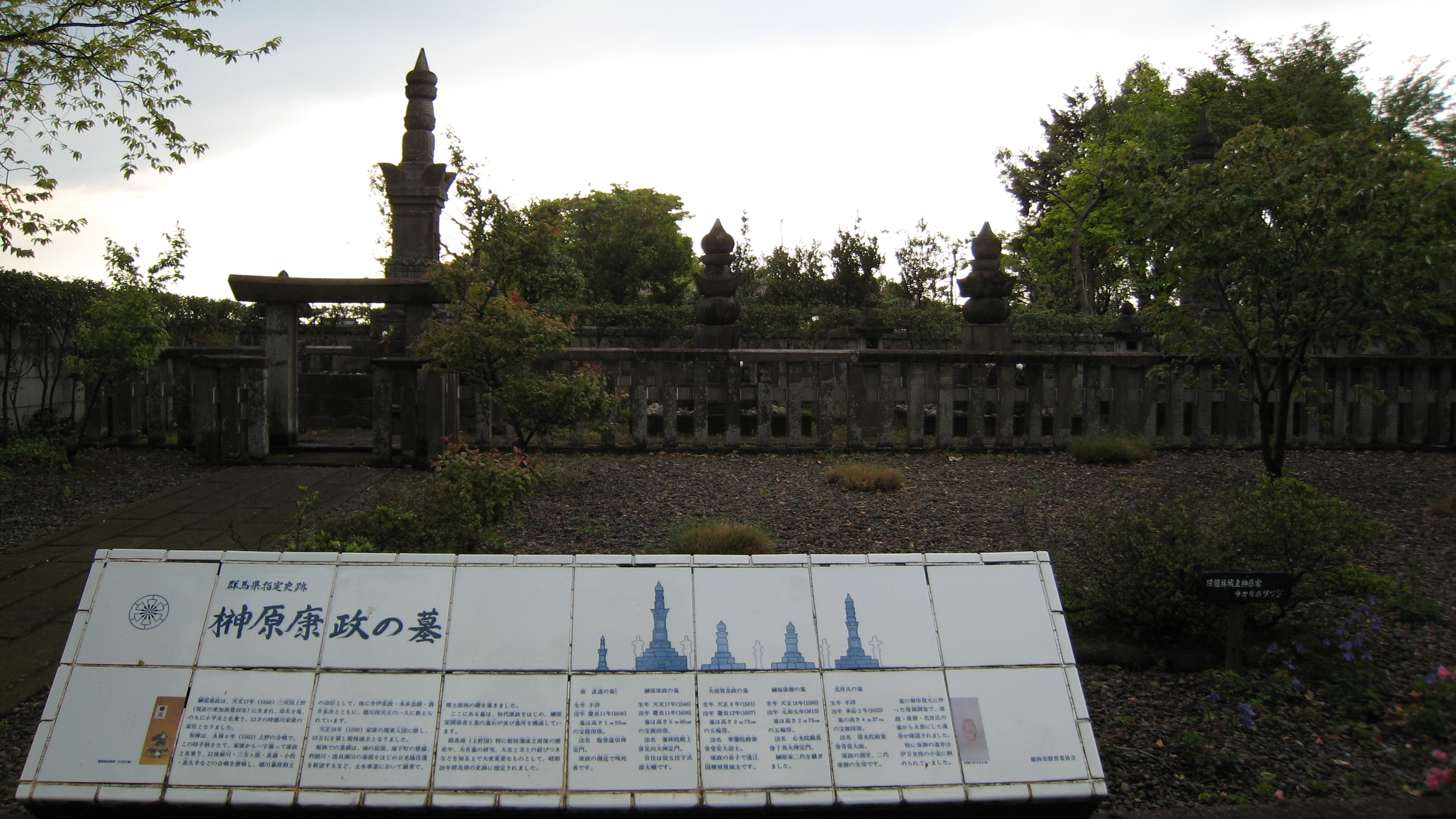
Yasumasa's tomb in Tatebayashi

Yasumasa himself died in 1606, at the age of 59, and is buried at Zendoji Temple in Tatebayashi, where his grave still stands. His son Sakakibara Yasukatsu fought at the Osaka Campaign.

Yasumasa's descendants in 18th century were known to govern 150,000 koku of fief in Takada Domain, Echigo Province as Daimyo.

After the death of Ieyasu, the original members of Yasumasa administration team, Nagashige Nakane, Tanemasa Harada, and Katsushige Murakami, seeking permission to leave their posts and return to serve the Tokugawa clan directly as Hatamoto. However, their request were denied by shogun Tokugawa Hidetada. Hidetada instead ordering them to keep serving the Sakakibara clan, while in exchange, each of their clans were awarded with hereditary domains worth 1,000 koku as appreciation for their service to the Sakakibara clan.

Descendants of Yasumasa continues to control Tatebayashi, until Sakakibara Tadatsugu was transferred to the Shirakawa Domain in Mutsu Province on July 4, 1643, the Tatebayashi domain was abolished and the domain became Tenryō(territory under the direct control of the shogunate).

== Personal Info ==
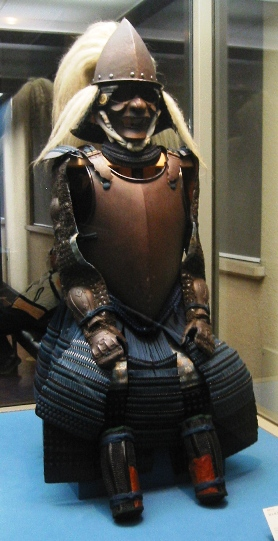
Sakakibara Yasumasa second armor with Nanban(european) style.

At an unknown time, Yasumasa acquired a Gusoku style armor from Mizuno Nobumoto, uncle of Ieyasu, which Yasumasa always wore during battles under the service of Ieyasu out of respect to Nobumoto. Yasumasa also owned Gusoku armor with Nanban-Dō (european style armor).

Yasumasa owned a sword named Sakakibara-Masamune, which he presented to Tokugawa Ieyasu. The sword was preserved for centuries by the Matsudaira clan. Unfortunately, it was destroyed during the Bombing of Tokyo.

According to Yasuo Hagiwara, Yasumasa was known for his clever mind and brilliant strategy, which showed when he tricked Ishida Mitsunari into believing that a huge army of 100,000 soldiers under Yasumasa had come to Ōmi, despite Yasumasa bringing only 3,000 soldiers.

There is anecdote in a record from a descendant of Sakakibara clan, and Bubijin Mokusho, that stated despite Tadakatsu exceeding Sakakibara Yasumasa in terms of valor and combat, Yasumasa had the better field leadership skill. Kazuto Hongō, history professor of University of Tokyo, gave his assessment that Yasumasa was a particularly talented general of the Tokugawa clan who also possessed an expertise in administration.

The Sakakibara clan under Yasumasa has its Bannerman carrying a flag with a kanji character "無" which translates into Mu (emptiness/void/nothingness). There is no historical record to indicate the meaning of this flag. However, Japanese writer and culturalist Shigezane Okaya citing the "Record of Famous General's Words; Volume 55: Yasumasa Sakakibara" that it was indicating the level headed and straightforward personality of Yasumasa. Alternatively, modern era popular theories regarding the meaning of Yasumasa's choice of the character as "Entering the Battlefield with clear mind", or "Serve their master without selfish desire". However, there was several other figures aside from Yasumasa who also used "Mu" as their character of warbanner, such as Oda Nobunaga, Hōjō Ujinao, and Sengoku Hidehisa.

One of the most famous quotes from Yasumasa is: "(when) senior vassals began to compete for position, (then) it is the sign of the decline of a nation".

Conrad Totman noted that after Sekigahara campaign, Ieyasu seems unwilling to include his original retainers, including Yasumasa, Honda Tadakatsu, and Ii Naomasa, in larger administration of the state. However, Harold Bolitho pointed out that this is instead their own decision to not involve themselves in Shogunate administrations and rather focusing on governing their own respective military domains. By appointed as Rōjū along with Ōkubo Tadachika and Honda Masazumi, Yasumasa held one of highest position in the Tokugawa shogunate. (Note: 岡谷『名将言行録』)

Preceded by none	Daimyō of Tatebayashi; 1590–1606	Succeeded by Sakakibara Yasukatsu

== Appendix ==
=== Bibliography ===
- Akira Imatani (1993). 天皇と天下人. 新人物往来社. ISBN 4404020732. "Akira Imatani"Practice of attacking fallen warriors"; 2000; p.153 chapter 4"
- Bolitho, Harold. (1974). Treasures Among Men: The Fudai Daimyo in Tokugawa Japan. New Haven: Yale University Press. ISBN 978-0-300-01655-0; OCLC 185685588
- Nakamura, Takaya (1959). 徳川家康文書の研究・中巻 [Research on the Documents of Tokugawa Ieyasu, Volume 2]. 日本学術振興会.
- Nussbaum, Louis Frédéric and Käthe Roth. (2005). Japan Encyclopedia. Cambridge: Harvard University Press. ISBN 978-0-674-01753-5; OCLC 48943301
- Shiba, Hiroyuki (2021). 徳川家康 [Studies on the Azuchi-Toyotomi Daimyo Volume 10]. シリーズ・織豊大名の研究 第十巻. 戎光祥出版. ISBN 978-4-86403-407-4.
- Stephen Turnbull (2013). The Samurai A Military History. Taylor & Francis. pp. 162–3. ISBN 9781134243693.
- Toshikazu Komiyama (2006). "榊原家家臣団の形成過程と幕藩体制" [The formation process of the Sakakibara family vassals and the Shogunate system]. Gakushuin University Studies in Humanities (in Japanese) (15). Gakushuin University: Creation of Fudai Daimyo and the Shogunate system” (Yoshikawa Kobunkan, 2015). ISBN 978-4-642-03468-5
- "榊原康政像（模本） さかきばらやすまさぞう". bunka.nii.ac.jp (in Japanese). The Agency for Cultural Affairs.
- Tanaka, Kaoru (2007). 松本藩. シリーズ藩物語. 現代書館. ISBN 978-4-7684-7108-1.
