= Hiraiwa Chikayoshi =

Japanese feudal lord (1542–1611)

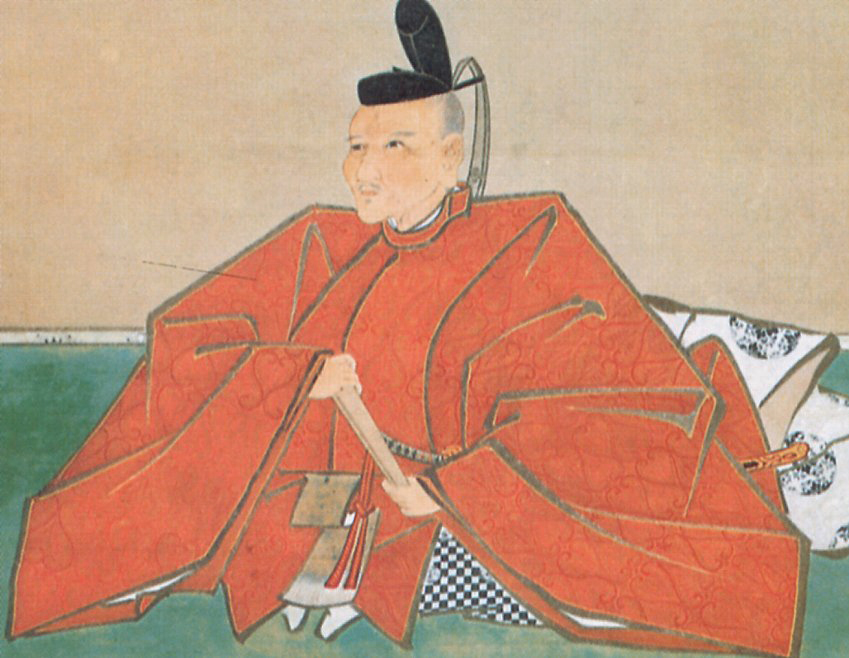
Hiraiwa Chikayoshi

Hiraiwa Chikayoshi (平岩 親吉; 1542 – February 1, 1611) was a Japanese daimyō of the early Edo period. He ruled the Inuyama Domain. According to legend, he was involved in a 1611 plot by Tokugawa Ieyasu to assassinate Toyotomi Hideyori, son and intended successor of Toyotomi Hideyoshi, through use of a poisoned manjū. Though the story has been historically discounted, it remains immortalized in a kabuki play.

In 1576, he assassinated Mizuno Nobumoto on the order of Tokugawa Ieyasu, who in turn instructed the assassination on the base that Nobumoto was conspiring with the enemies.

Preceded by Ogasawara Yoshitsugu	1st Daimyō of Inuyama (Hiraiwa); 1607–1611	Succeeded by Naruse Masanari
