= Takeda =

- Mon of the Takeda clan

Takeda (武田, Takeda, "warrior rice paddy") or Takeda (竹田, Takeda, "bamboo rice paddy") is a Japanese family name. Throughout the course of the Sengoku period (16th century) of Japan, the famed Takeda clan of Kai Province had many descendant branch families.

- Takeda clan (Aki) is a family in the Aki Province
- Takeda clan (Wakasa)
- Takeda clan (Kazusa)

== People ==
- Daisaku Takeda (武田 大作; born 1973), Japanese rower
- Genyo Takeda (竹田 玄洋; born 1949), retired Japanese game designer and executive
- Hisayoshi Takeda (武田 久吉; 1883–1972), Japanese botanist
- Kumiko Takeda (武田 久美子; born 1968), Japanese actress
- Larissa Tago Takeda (武田 羅梨沙 多胡), Japanese voice actress
- Masashi Takeda (wrestler) (竹田 誠志; born 1985), Japanese professional wrestler and mixed martial artist
- Misae Takeda (武田 美佐江; born 1943), Japanese speed skater
- Nana Takeda (武田 奈也; born 1988), Japanese figure skater
- Sachihiko Takeda (武田 幸彦; born 1937), Japanese sport wrestler
- Satoshi Takeda (武田 聡; born 1968), Japanese swimmer
- Shinzaburo Takeda, Mexican artist
- Shogo Takeda (竹田 渉瑚; born 1995), Japanese swimmer
- Takeda Sōkaku (武田 惣角; 1859–1943), reviver of Daitō-ryū aiki-jūjutsu
- Takeda-no-miya, one of the former ōke, or cadet branches of the Japanese imperial house established during the Meiji period by a scion of the Fushimi-no-miya. Not related to the samurai family.
- Takeda clan, the family of Takeda Shingen, and a relatively important and powerful one therefore, in Japan's Sengoku period
  - Takeda Nobutora – daimyō, Shingen's father
  - Takeda Shingen – one of the most famous daimyōs in Japanese history
  - Takeda Nobushige – Shingen's younger brother, held their father's favour to be heir of the clan, continued to support his older brother throughout his life, he also wrote the Kyūjūkyū Kakun, a set of 99 short rules for Takeda house members
  - Takeda Nobukado – brother and adviser to Shingen
  - Takeda Katsuyori – Shingen's son, Katsuyori commanded his father's armies after his death, and saw the fall of the Takeda family
  - Takeda Yoshinobu – son and initial heir, later executed and succeeded by Katsuyori
- Toyoki Takeda (武田 豊樹; born 1974), Japanese speed skater
- Tsunekazu Takeda (竹田 恆和; born 1947), Japanese retired equestrian, former member of the IOC
- Yasuhiko Takeda (武田 泰彦; born 1937), Japanese rower
- Yūkichi Takeda (武田 祐吉; 1886–1958) scholar of Japanese Literature

== Fictional characters ==
- Masashi Takeda, from My-Hime
- Takashi Takeda, from Yotsuba&!
- Gohee Takeda, from Ginga: Nagareboshi Gin
- Takeda Takahashi, from Mortal Kombat
- Ittesu Takeda, from Haikyū!!
- Hyouma Takeda, from Gantz
- Keiichiro "Take" Takeda, from Gender-Swap at the Delinquent Academy
- Aimi Takeda, also from Gender-Swap at the Delinquent Academy
- Ijuro Takeda, from The Hunted

== See also ==
- Takeda (video game)
- Takeda Pharmaceutical Company (Takeda; 武田薬品)
