= Siege of Uchiyama =

- Part of the Sengoku period
Date	1546
Location	Uchiyama, Shinano Province
Result	Siege succeeds; Takeda victory
Territorial changes	Uchiyama falls to Takeda Shingen

Belligerents
Takeda clan	Uchiyama garrison

Commanders and leaders
Takeda Shingen	Oi Sadakiyo

Strength
2,900	2,200

The 1546 siege of Uchiyama was one of many battles fought by Takeda Shingen bid to gain control of Shinano Province. His troops surrounded the fortress and starved out the garrison.

== Background ==
The battle took place during the 16th-century Sengoku period, also known as the "Age of Civil War". After the Ōnin War (1467–77), the shōgun's system and taxation had increasingly less control outside the province of the capital in Kyoto, and powerful lords (daimyōs) began to assert themselves. Such lords gained power by usurpation, warfare or marriage—any means that would safeguard their position. It was manifested in yamajiro ("mountain castles"), which overlooked the provinces.

One of the most ambitious and successful warlords of the period was Takeda Shingen, the daimyō of the Takeda clan, which dominated Kai Province. Bordering Kai to the north was Shinano Province, a large mountainous territory which was not controlled by a single clan but by several relatively weak ones, notably the Suwa, Ogasawara, Murakami and Takato. As such it was an attractive target to its neighbours, in particular the Takeda to the south and Uesugi clan of Echigo Province to the north. Takeda Shingen's father, Takeda Nobutora, had already made a probing expedition into Shinano in 1536 (leading to the Battle of Un no Kuchi), and after becoming daimyō himself Shingen mounted his own invasion in 1542, which ended with the successful conquest of the Suwa. One of the castles Shingen seized was that of Nagakubo, which he entrusted to Oi Sadataka. However, in 1543 Sadataka betrayed Shingen and went over to the Takato. Shingen responded by mounting a second invasion of Shinano in 1543, and he quickly seized Nagakubo and captured Sadataka. Sadataka's son Oi Sadakiyo continued to resist, making his base at Uchiyama, but Shingen was temporarily distracted by a renewed the threat from the Takato, whom he spent the next two years fighting.

== Siege ==
Once that threat was finally dealt with, Shingen was free to turn his attention back to Oi Sadakiyo. He marched against Sadakiyo's fortress at Uchiyama in June 1546 and successfully starved it into submission.

== Aftermath ==
Uchiyama subsequently became a Takeda base for operations deeper in Shinano Province. After the Takeda reverse at the Battle of Uedahara it was attacked and burned on 1 June 1548 by Ogasawara Nagatoki and the Murakami clan, but Shingen's general Oyamada Nobushige regained it in September.
