= Tada Mitsuyori =

Japanese samurai (1501–1563)

- 多田 満頼
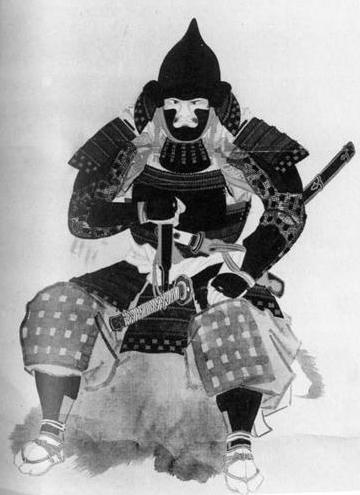
- Born: 1501
- Died: 1563 (aged 61–62)
- Military career
- Allegiance: Takeda clan
- Conflicts: Battle of Sezawa (1542); Siege of Uehara (1542)

Tada Mitsuyori (多田 満頼; 1501–1563) was a Japanese samurai of the Sengoku period . He is known as one of the "Twenty-Four Generals of Takeda Shingen".

== Military life ==
It is known that Mitsuyori fought in over 29 battles under Shingen, some of them being Battle of Sezawa (1542) and Siege of Uehara (1542). Mitsuyori was very skilled at night warfare. In which he put to good use at battle of Sezawa.

== Personal life ==
Mitsuyori was a native of the Mino Province. He first served under the daimyō Takeda Nobutora, but later on served under Takeda Shingen, Nobutora's son.

== Death ==
In 1563, Mitsuyori died of illness.
