= Yōgaiyama Castle =

Yōgaiyama castle
- 要害山城
- Kōfu, Yamanashi, Japan
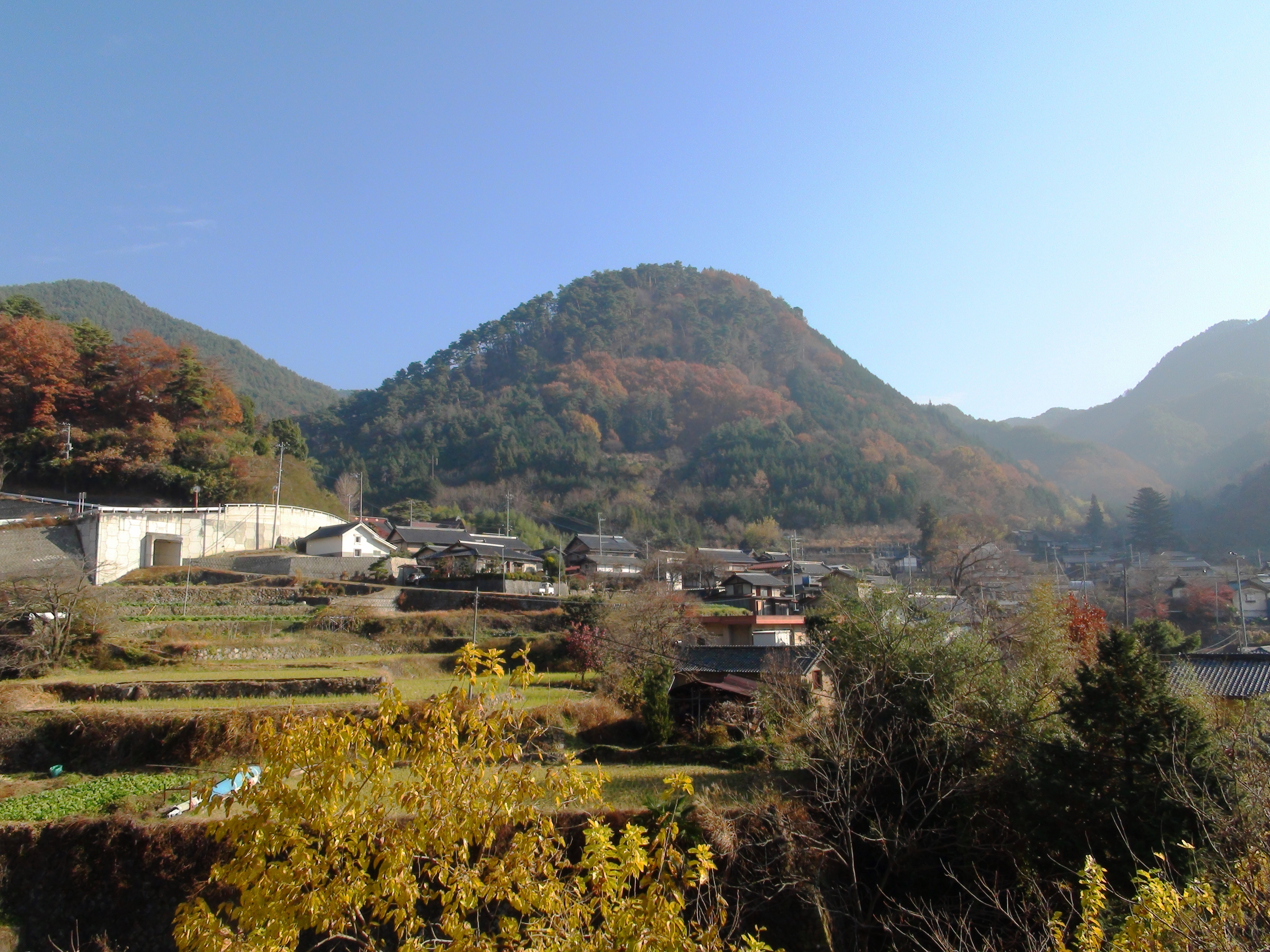
- Yōgaiyama

Site information
- Type: Yamashiro-style Japanese castle
- Condition: ruins

Location
- Coordinates: 35°42′10.93″N 138°35′53.61″E

Site history
- Built: 1520
- Built by: Takeda Nobutora
- In use: 1520-1600
- Materials: Wood, earthwork

Yōgaiyama Castle (要害山城, Yōgaiyama-jō) was a Sengoku period yamajiro located in Kai Province (present day Yamanashi Prefecture), constructed in the 1520s by the Takeda clan. Since 1991, the ruins have been protected as a National Historic Site since 1938. The castle is also known as the Sekisuiyama Castle (積翠山城, Sekisuiyama-jō).

== Background ==
The Takeda clan was a cadet branch of the Minamoto clan, and gradually gained control over Kai Province from the late Heian period from their bases at Hakusan Castle and Yato Castle. From the Kamakura period to the Sengoku period, they were the shugo of Kai Province, and Takeda Nobutora (1493-1573) selected a location near the center of the province to build his fortified residence and jōkamachi in 1519. This was the Tsutsujigasaki Yakata in what is now the city of Kōfu. Although a strongly-fortified manor house, its primary defenses were moats, and it was considered unsuitable to withstanding a siege. Nobutora therefore fortified a nearby 770 metres (2,530 ft) mountain, Yōgaiyama, as a supporting castle and final redoubt with wooden rampartss and earthenworks defenses and built a signal tower on its summit.

== Description ==
Yōgaiyama Castle occupies a narrow ridge, and consists of 20 terraces cut into the hillside. The route does not climb directly between terraces, but wanders back-and-forth, so as to expose any enemy to attack by defenders in the terrace above. The inner bailey is a rectangular area 80 x 30 meters at the highest point of the mountain, and was surrounded by clay walls. The enclosure has gates on its eastern and western sides. The total length of the castle is over 500 meters.

== History ==
On 16 October 1521, Takeda Nobutora defeated the Imagawa at the Battle of Iidagawara. Nobutora faced an invasion of a 15,000-strong army from neighboring Suruga Province led by Imagawa clan general Fukushima Masanari in support of the rebellion of the Ōi clan against Takeda rule. Nobutora sent his wife, the daughter of Ōi Nobusato, to the Yōgaiyama Castle for safekeeping. She gave birth to a son the day before Nobutora defeated the invasion, and in celebration of the event, Nobutora named their son, the future Takeda Shingen, “Katsuchiyo”.

In 1576, Takeda Katsuyori ordered that the fortifications be renovated on a large scale. After the fall of the Takeda clan, the castle was controlled by a succession of retainers of Tokugawa Ieyasu, followed by Toyotomi Hideyoshi, one of whom, Katō Mitsuyasu, made some further modifications to the defenses. However, after the Battle of Sekigahara in 1600, the castle was abandoned along with the Tsutsujigasaki Castle in favor of the new Kōfu Castle.

At present, all that remains of the castle are some foundation stones and remnants of earthenworks of the motte-and-bailey structures. The castle was listed as one of the Continued Top 100 Japanese Castles in 2017. In the southeastern direction from Yōgaiyama Castle, there is a branch castle ruin called Kumajō, which supplements the southern defense of Yōgaiyama Castle, and it is included in the National Historic Site designation. The Yōgaiyama Castle ruins can be reached by bus from Kōfu Station on the JR East Chūō Main Line.

== See also ==
- List of Historic Sites of Japan (Yamanashi)

== Bibliography ==
- Motoo, Hinago (1986). Japanese Castles. Tokyo: Kodansha. p. 200 pages. ISBN 0-87011-766-1.
- Inoue Munekazu. Nihon no Meijo. Yuzankaku publishing (1992). ISBN 4639011075
