= Takeda Nobushige =

Japanese samurai (1525-1561)

- 武田 信繁
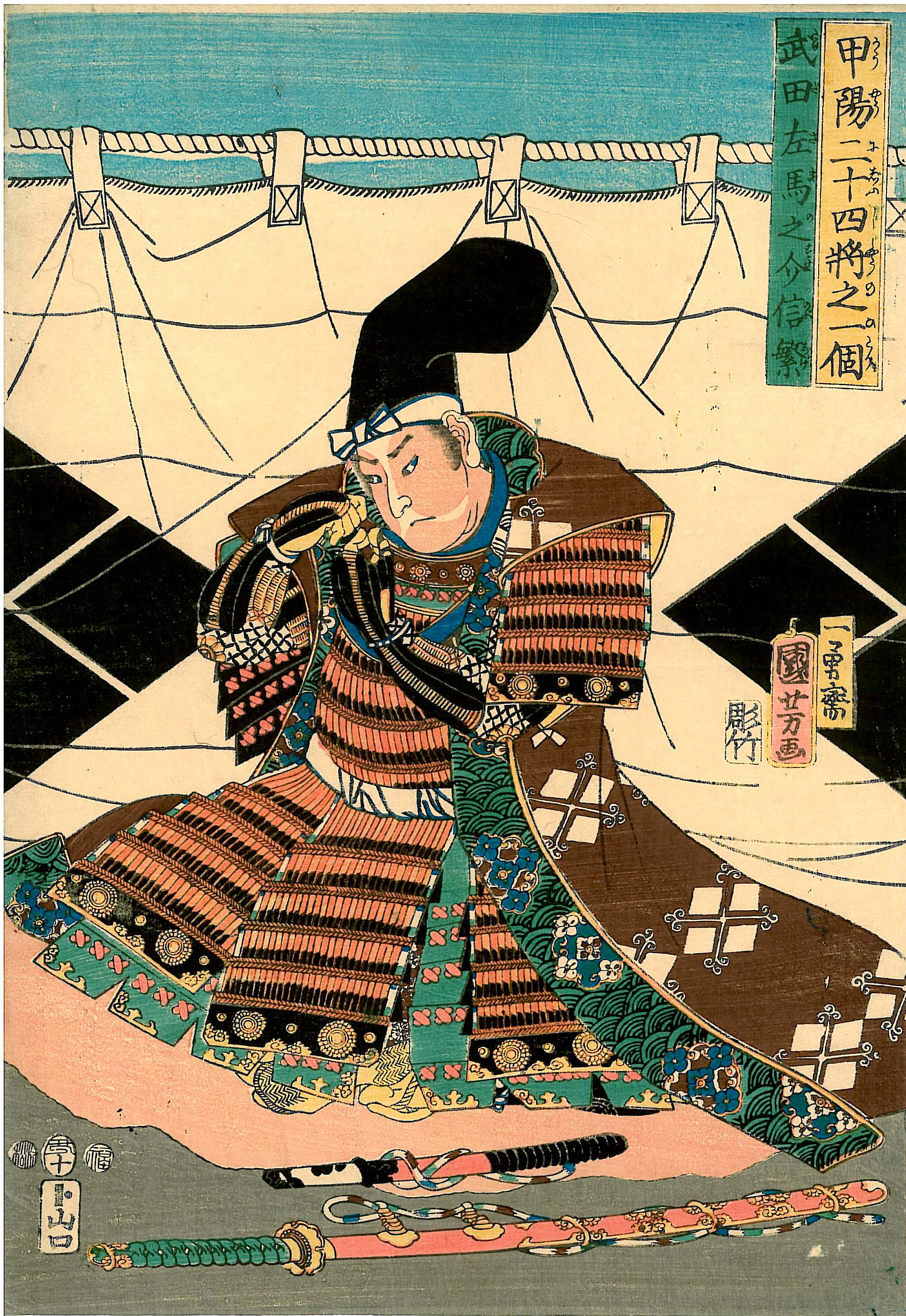
- Born: 1525
- Died: 1561 (aged 35–36)
- Relatives: Takeda Shingen
- Military career
- Allegiance: Takeda clan
- Nickname: Takeda Tenkyū
- Conflicts: Shinano campaign (1542-1557); Battles of Kawanakajima (1561)

Takeda Nobushige (武田 信繁; 1525 – October 18, 1561) was a samurai of Japan's Sengoku period, and younger brother of Takeda Shingen. He was known as one of the "Twenty-Four Generals of Takeda Shingen".

== Military life ==
Takeda Nobushige held the favor of their father, Takeda Nobutora, then daimyo of Takeda clan, and was meant to inherit the Takeda lands, wealth and power, becoming head of the clan. However, Shingen rebelled against their father and seized the lands and power for himself.

Nobushige nevertheless fought alongside his brother who relied on him for support, He is famous not only for his strategic insight but also his wisdom; he wrote among other things Kyūjūkyū Kakun, a set of 99 short rules or disciplines for Takeda clan members, some of which are erroneously attributed to Shingen himself from time to time.

== Personal life ==
Takeda Nobushige held the favor of their father, and was meant to inherit the Takeda lands, wealth and power, becoming head of the clan. However, Shingen rebelled against their father and seized the lands and power for himself.

He is also known as Takeda Tenkyū (Tenkyū being another rank he held). Nobushige became an important Takeda general and led large forces on several occasions. In 1544, Shingen had a rebellion on his hands. As part of his punitive effort, he sent Nobushige to capture Fujisawa Yorichika's Kōjinyama castle. (He probably succeeded, though sources differ). Katsurao castle, main castle of Murakami Yoshikiyo, fell to Nobushige and Takeda Yoshinobu in 1553. This drove Yoshikiyo to fleet to Uesugi Kenshin and was really the last significant act before the start of the Kawanakajima campaigns proper. It was in the 4th battle of Kawanakajima, the last battle, that Takeda Nobushige gave up his life.

Sanada Yukimura's initial name was, in fact, Sanada Nobushige, named after this very person.

== In popular culture ==
Noritoshi Kashima portrayed Nobushige in NHK's 2006 Taiga drama.

== Family ==
- Father: Takeda Nobutora (1493-1574)
- Brothers:
  - Takematsu (1517-1523)
  - Takeda Shingen (1521-1573)
  - Inuchiyo (1523-1529)
  - Takeda Nobumoto
  - Takeda Nobukado (1529-1582)
  - Matsuo Nobukore (ca. 1530s-1571)
  - Takeda Souchi
  - Takeda Nobuzane (ca. 1530s-1575)
  - Ichijō Nobutatsu (ca. 1539-1582)
- Sisters:
  - Joukei-in (1519-1550), married Imagawa Yoshimoto
  - Nanshou-in (born 1520) married Anayama Nobutomo
  - Nene (1528-1543) married Suwa Yorishige
