= Hiraga =

Hiraga (written: 平賀) is a Japanese surname. Notable people with the surname include:

- Hiraga Gennai (平賀 源内, 1728–1780), Japanese pharmacologist, writer, painter and inventor
- Hiraga Genshin (平賀 源信, died 1536), Japanese samurai
- Yuzuru Hiraga (平賀 譲, 1878–1943), Imperial Japanese Navy admiral, engineer and naval architect

== Fictional characters ==
- Saito Hiraga (平賀 才人), protagonist and the light novel series The Familiar of Zero
