= Takeda Nobukado =

Japanese samurai warrior

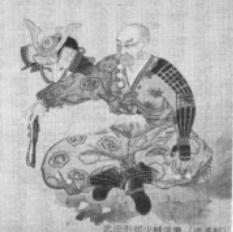
Portrait of Takeda Nobukado

Takeda Nobukado (武田 信廉; 1529–1582) was a Japanese samurai (warrior) and general of the Takeda clan during the Sengoku period. He was known as one of the "Twenty-Four Generals of Takeda Shingen". He is also well known as a painter.

== Relationship with Shingen ==
It has been said that Nobukado and Shingen were as like as two peas, therefore he served as body double or kagemusha (shadow samurai) for Shingen.

== Death ==
When Nobunaga attacked Oshima castle Nobukado was defending, Nobukado escaped from the castle without fighting, but he ended up being captured and beheaded.

== Family ==
- Father: Takeda Nobutora (1493-1574)
- Brothers:
  - Takematsu (1517-1523)
  - Takeda Shingen (1521-1573)
  - Inuchiyo (1523-1529)
  - Takeda Nobushige (1525-1561)
  - Takeda Nobumoto
  - Matsuo Nobukore (ca. 1530s-1571)
  - Takeda Souchi
  - Takeda Nobuzane (ca. 1530s-1575)
  - Ichijō Nobutatsu (ca. 1539-1582)
- Sisters:
  - Joukei-in (1519-1550), married Imagawa Yoshimoto
  - Nanshou-in (born 1520) married Anayama Nobutomo
  - Nene (1528-1543) married Suwa Yorishige

== In popular culture ==
Nobukado is one of the main characters in Akira Kurosawa's film Kagemusha, the role of Nobukado was played by Tsutomu Yamazaki.
