= Nobuzane =

- Gender: Male

Origin
- Origin: Japanese
- Meaning: Different meanings depending on the kanji used

Nobuzane (written: 信実) is a masculine Japanese given name. Notable people with the name include:

- Fujiwara Nobuzane (藤原 信実; 1176–1265), Japanese painter
- Takeda Nobuzane (武田 信実; died 1575), Japanese samurai
