= Tsutsujigasaki Castle =

Japanese historical site

Tsutsujigasaki Yakata
- 躑躅ヶ崎館
- Kōfu, Yamanashi, Japan
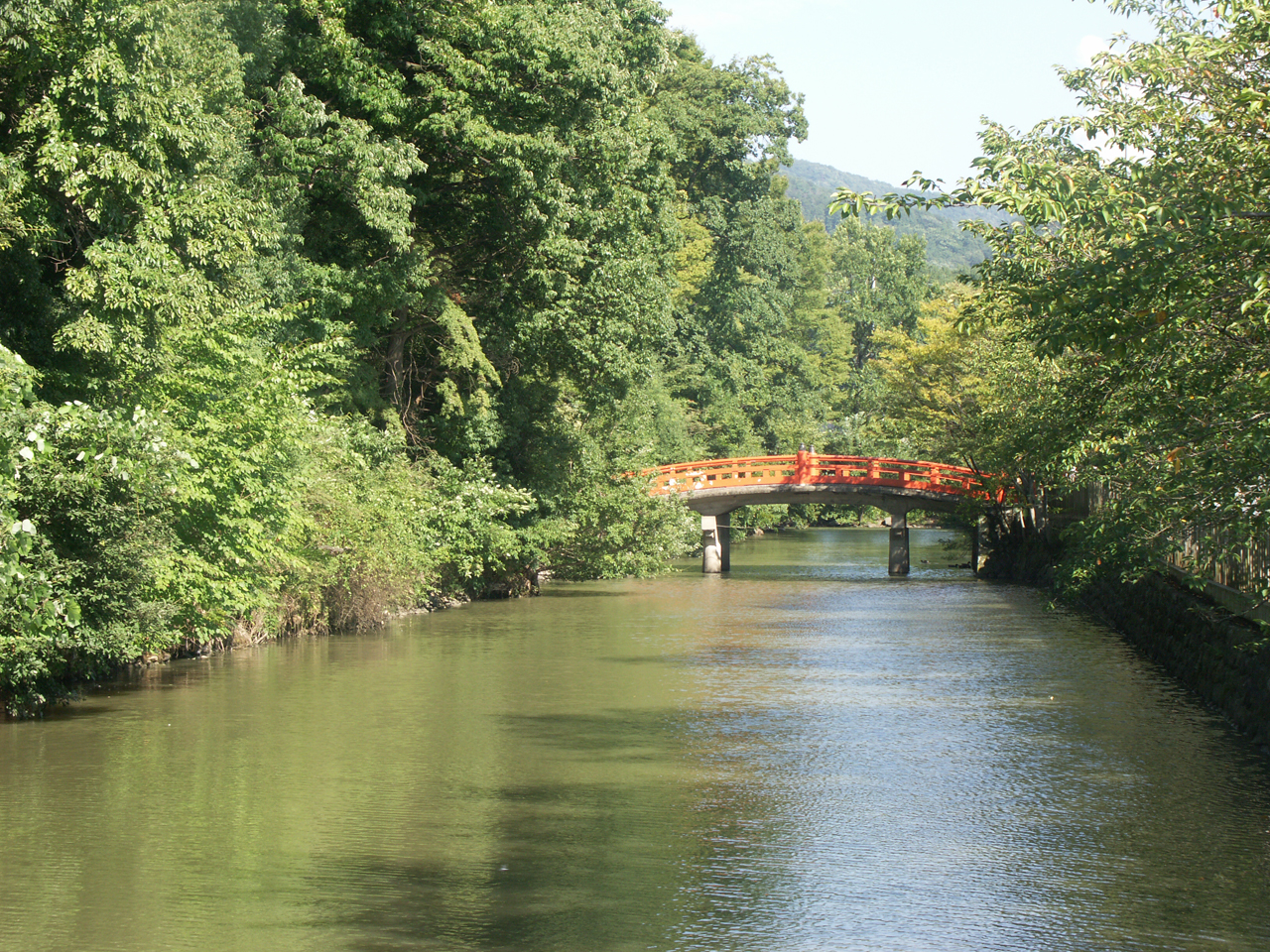
- Surviving moat of Tsutsujigasaki Yakata

Site information
- Type: flatland-style Japanese castle
- Controlled by: Takeda clan
- Condition: Ruins

Location
- Location within Yamanashi Prefecture Location within Japan
- Coordinates: 35°41′12″N 138°34′39″E

Site history
- Built: 1519
- Built by: Takeda Nobutora
- In use: 1594

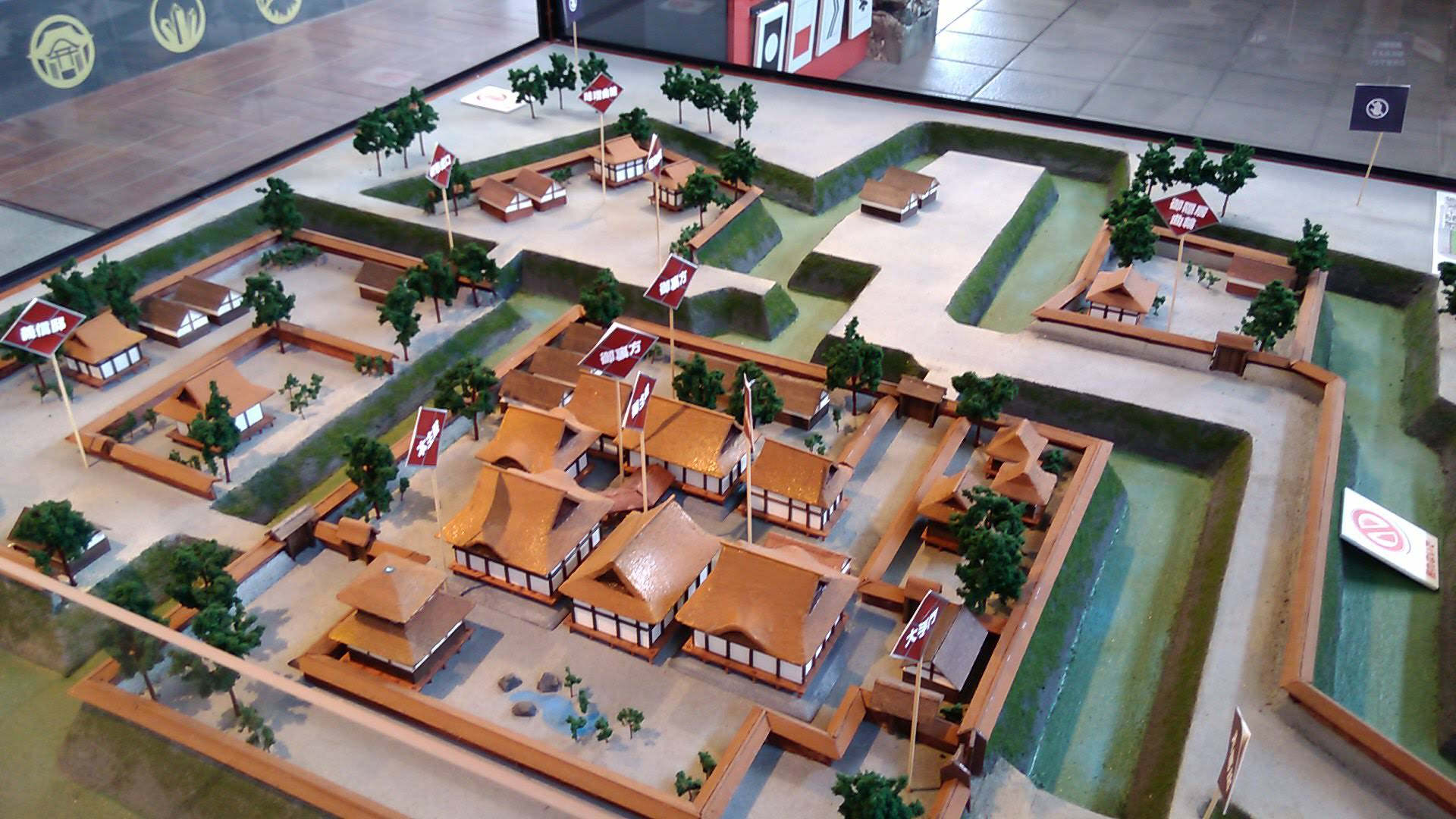
Model of Tsutsujigasaki Castle

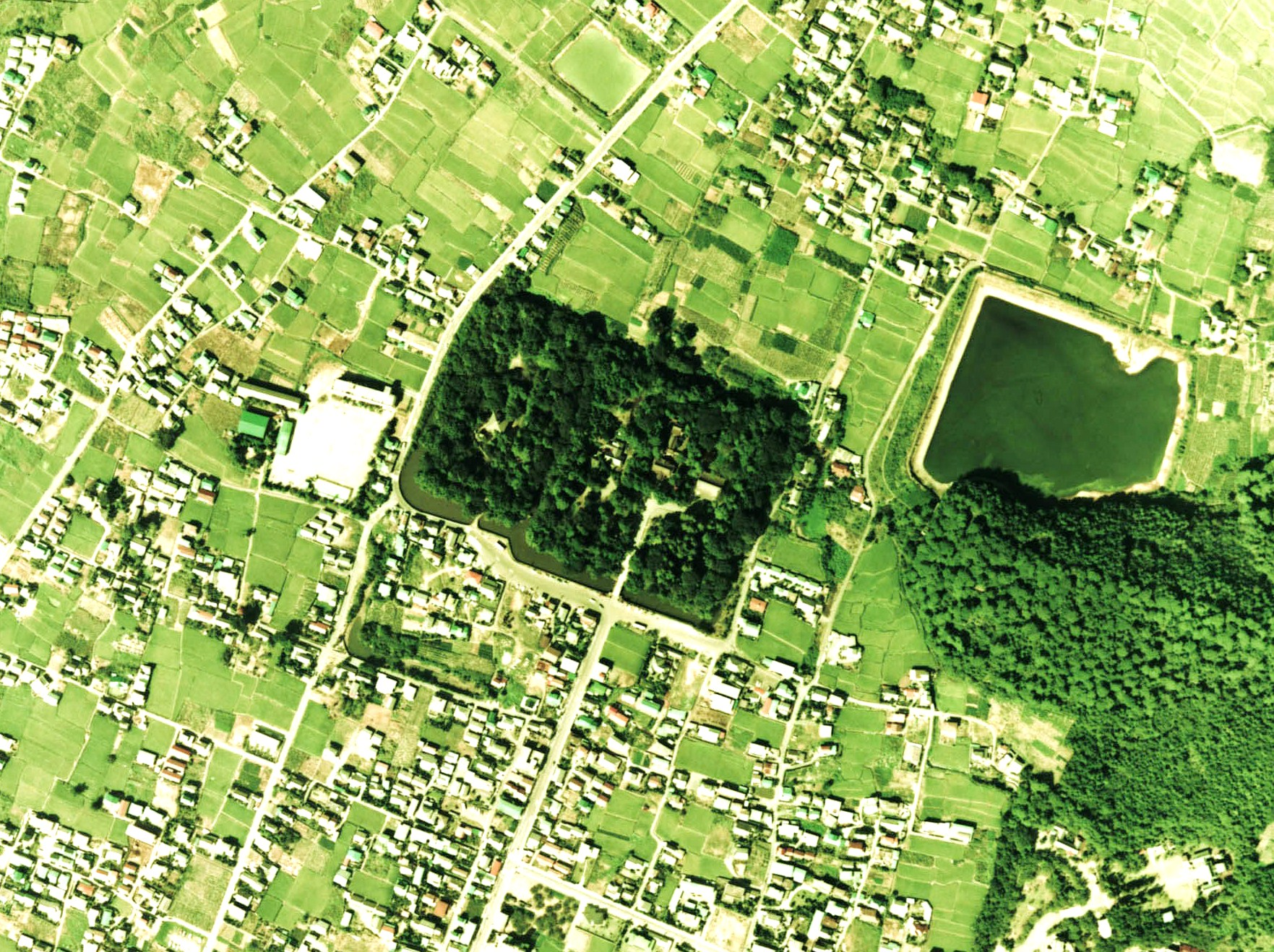
Tsutsujigasaki Castle Aerial Photograph

Tsutsujigasaki Castle (躑躅ヶ崎館, Tsutsujigasaki yakata) was the fortified residence of the final three generations of the Takeda clan, located in the center of the city of Kōfu, Yamanashi Prefecture, Japan. It is not a Japanese castle in the proper sense of the word, and is not referred to as a "castle" in Japanese, as it was famously the policy of the Takeda clan to "make men your castle, men your walls, men your moats". Nevertheless, it is listed as one of Japan's Top 100 Castles. The ruins have been protected as a National Historic Site since 1938. The site is open to the public and now contains the Takeda Shrine, a Shinto shrine dedicated to the deified spirits of the Takeda clan.

== Background ==
The Takeda clan was a cadet branch of the Minamoto clan, and gradually gained control over Kai Province from the late Heian period from their bases at Hakusan Castle and Yato Castle. By the Sengoku period, the clan held the position of shugo of Kai Province, and Takeda Nobutora selected a location near the center of the province to build this fortified residence and jōkamachi in 1519. The location was on a gentle slope in the flatlands of the Kōfu Basin, and was considered indefensible by contemporary standards, which dictated that fortifications be built on mountains. Nobutora also built a mountain fortification (Yōgaiyama Castle) nearby as a supporting castle and final redoubt.

== Description ==
Tsutsujigasaki consisted of two main enclosures surrounded by a triple series of two flooded moats and one dry moat. The central enclosure was 200 meters square and contained the private residence of the Takeda ruler. The western enclosure is 100 by 200 meters, and was a public area for the administration of the domain, with "umadashi"-style two-story fortified gates to the north and south. Flanking both enclosures, outside the main gates, and also surrounded by water moats, were two kuruwa secondary enclosures; the Miso-guruwa and Baio-guruwa. This was the largest residential complex in eastern Japan during the Sengoku period. The only remains today are some of the surviving water-filled moats and some minor stonework. The Takeda Shrine, built in 1919 is in the centre of the site. To the right of the shrine is a museum, guarded by a stone Hello Kitty.

== History ==
Tsutsujigasaki continued to serve as the principal residence of Takeda Shingen after he deposed his father in 1540. However, his son Takeda Katsuyori built Shinpu Castle, a new and larger castle at Nirasaki and transferred his residence there in 1581. The Takeda clan was extinguished by the coalition forces of Oda Nobunaga and Tokugawa Ieyasu in February 1582. Afterwards, Nobunaga's general, Kawajiri Hidetaka ruled Kai Province from Tsutsujigasaki until Nobunaga's assassination. The Kai Province then came under the direct control of the Tokugawa clan and with the completion of the nearby Kōfu Castle in 1594, the site was abandoned.

== See also ==
- List of Historic Sites of Japan (Yamanashi)
