= Takeda Nobuzane =

Kawakubo (Takeda) Nobuzane
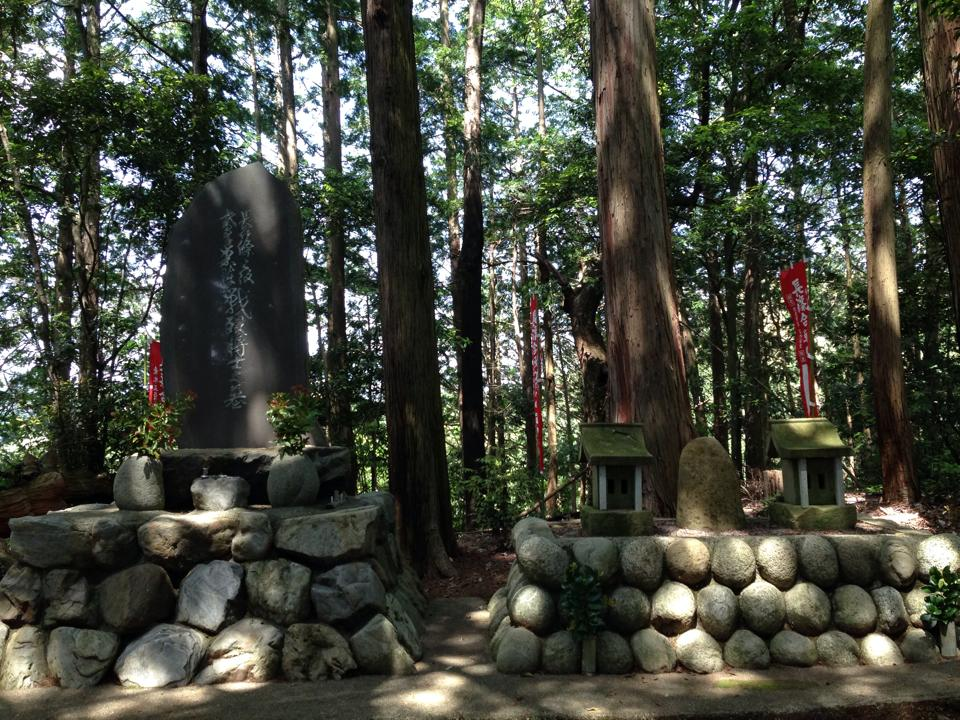
- Takeda Nobuzane graveyard
- Native name: 武田信実 or 河窪信実
- Born: ca. 1530s Japan
- Died: 29 June 1575 Nagashino, Mikawa Province, Japan
- Allegiance: Takeda family
- Conflicts: Battle of Mikatagahara (1573); Battle of Nagashino (1575)

Takeda Nobuzane (武田信実) more commonly known as Kawakubo Nobuzane (河窪 信実) (1530 - died 29 June 1575) was a younger half-brother of Takeda Shingen, a preeminent daimyō (feudal lord) who vied for the control of Japan in the late stage of Sengoku, the "warring states" period. He was also called Kawakubo Nobuzane because he was raised in Kawakubo village.

After the death of his older brother Matsuo Nobukore in 1571, Shingen ordered Nobuzane’s son Nobutoshi to be the successor to the Matsuo family and Nobutoshi was married to Nobukore’s daughter.

In 1575 at the Battle of Nagashino, Nobuzane did not participate in the field battle proper between Takeda Katsuyori and the Oda-Tokugawa Alliance. Instead Nobuzane was deployed on Mt. Tobigasu to maintain the siege on Tokugawa's forces in Nagashino Castle, assuring they did not escape and link up with the main Oda-Tokugawa army. But he was ambushed by troops under the command of the alliance’s generals Sakai Tadatsugu and Kanamori Nagachika.

Early on the morning of June 29, Nobuzane’s men were ambushed by Sakai’s men upon the ridge. Nobuzane resisted the attack in the main fortress on Mt. Tobigasu while dispatching Saegusa Masasada to defend the four outlying forts. However Nobuzane lacked enough troops to properly defend the five-fort complex, and his troops were stretched too thinly to be effective against the attack. Sakai Tadatsugu's troops were successful in setting the forts on fire and Takeda Nobuzane was killed in the hand-to-hand fighting that followed as his fort was overrun.

It is said that those dedicated to Nobuzane created a small hill called Hyougotsuka after his courtesy title of Hyougo-no-suke on Mt. Tobigasu, however in the time since then the area has been reclaimed by farmland and nothing remains.

== Family ==
- Father: Takeda Nobutora (1493–1574)
- Brothers:
  - Takematsu (1517–1523)
  - Takeda Shingen (1521–1573)
  - Inuchiyo (1523–1529)
  - Takeda Nobushige (1525–1561)
  - Takeda Nobumoto
  - Takeda Nobukado (1529–1582)
  - Matsuo Nobukore (ca. 1530s–1571)
  - Takeda Souchi
  - Ichijō Nobutatsu (ca. 1539–1582)
- Sisters:
  - Joukei-in (1519–1550), married Imagawa Yoshimoto
  - Nanshou-in (born 1520) married Anayama Nobutomo
  - Nene (1528–1543) married Suwa Yorishige
- Son: Kawakubo Nobutoshi
