= Battle of Sezawa =

- Part of the Sengoku period
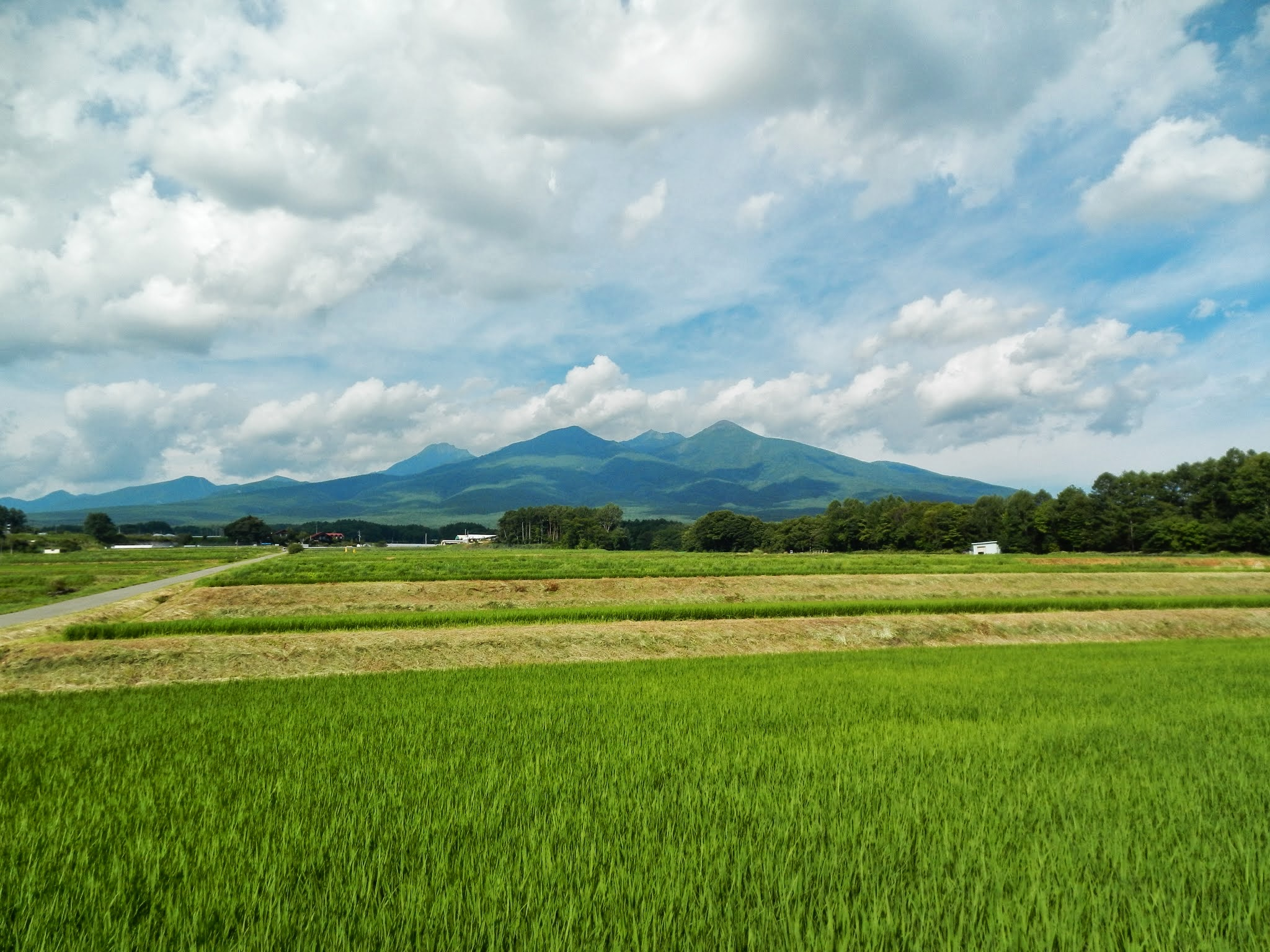
- The battle took place in the vicinity of the modern town of Fujimi
Date	9 March 1542
Location	Sezawa, Shinano Province (now Fujimi, Nagano Prefecture) 35°53′46″N 138°14′40″E
Result	Takeda victory

Belligerents
Takeda clan	Ogasawara clan Suwa clan Murakami clan Other Shinano daimyō

Commanders and leaders
Takeda Shingen	Ogasawara Nagatoki; Suwa Yorishige; Murakami Yoshikiyo; Kiso Yoshiyasu; Tozawa Yorichika

Strength
3,000	12,000

Casualties and losses
500	3,000
- Location within Nagano Prefecture Battle of Sezawa (Japan)

The Battle of Sezawa was the first major battle fought by Takeda Shingen in his campaign to gain control of Shinano Province. He took on and defeated a coalition of Shinano daimyō including the leaders of the Suwa, Ogasawara and Murakami clans.

== Background ==
Shingen's campaigns in Shinano took place during Japan's 16th-century Sengoku period, also known as the "Age of Civil War". After the Ōnin War (1467–77), the shōgun largely lost control of the country beyond the immediate vicinity of the capital Kyoto, and local warlords (daimyōs) quickly sprang up to fill the resulting power vacuum, warring constantly with one another and building yamajiro ("mountain castles") to control territory.

In some parts of Japan, a single daimyō was able to control an entire province, and such was the case in Kai Province, northwest of modern Tokyo, which was dominated by the Takeda clan. However, to the north of Kai was the sprawling, mountainous Shinano Province, in which a number of relatively weak warlords coexisted, among them the Suwa, Ogasawara, Murakami and Takato clans. The fragmentation of power in Shinano, and its strategic position in the middle of Honshu, made it an attractive target to its more powerful neighbours, and in the 1530s, Takeda Shingen's father, Takeda Nobutora, made a probing expedition into the province. The campaign met with mixed success, although the young Shingen (then called Harunobu) did distinguish himself by his bravery and leadership at the 1536 Battle of Un no Kuchi.

== Battle ==
In 1541, Shingen usurped his father and became the leader of the Takeda clan, and he subsequently resolved to mount his own invasion of Shinano. At this time, Suwa Yorishige, a daimyō of southwest Shinano, was involved in a dispute with a shrine near Lake Suwa, and this provided Shingen with the necessary pretext to invade. He declared war on the Suwa and led his army into Shinano in 1542, but in doing so, he provoked a coalition of Shinano lords to form against him, led by Yorishige, Ogasawara Nagatoki, Murakami Yoshikiyo, and Kiso Yoshiyasu.

As a result, Shingen was greatly outnumbered when the two sides met at Sezawa, to the southeast of Lake Suwa, but he decided to give battle anyway and took the gamble of launching a night attack through misty rain. The gamble paid off and he succeeded in routing the allied forces. In doing so, he had won a startling victory; the allies had gathered a force of 12,000 Shinano warriors, but Shingen had defeated them with just 3,000 men; moreover, he had succeeded in inflicting about 3,000 casualties, while his forces had suffered about 500 losses.

== Aftermath ==
After the disaster at Sezawa, the anti-Takeda coalition fell apart, and the Murakami and Ogasawara retreated to their territories in northern Shinano, leaving the Suwa at the mercy of Shingen, who overran their territory later that year. Over the next eleven years, Shingen gradually worked his way northwards through Shinano and seemingly completed the conquest of the province in 1553, after seizing the last Murakami stronghold at Katsurao. However, his success alarmed the Uesugi clan of Echigo Province (bordering Shinano to the north), and they subsequently invaded, leading to the famous Battles of Kawanakajima between Shingen and Uesugi Kenshin.

== Sources ==
- Turnbull, Stephen (1998). The Samurai Sourcebook. Cassell & Co. ISBN 1854095234.
- Turnbull, Stephen (2013). Kawanakajima 1553–64: Samurai power struggle. Oxford: Osprey Publishing. ISBN 978-1-84603-652-1.
