= Ichijō Nobutatsu =

Japanese samurai

Takeda clan Mon

Ichijō Nobutatsu (一条 信龍, 1539 – April 2, 1582) was a Japanese samurai of the Sengoku period, who was the younger brother of Takeda Shingen, the ruler and daimyo of Kai Province. He is known as one of the "Twenty-Four Generals of Takeda Shingen". Nobutatsu also served under Shingen's son and de facto heir, Takeda Katsuyori. He fought at Nagashino in 1575.

== Family ==
- Father: Takeda Nobutora (1494-1574)
- Brothers:
  - Takematsu (1517-1523)
  - Takeda Shingen (1521-1573)
  - Inuchiyo (1523-1529)
  - Takeda Nobushige (1525-1561)
  - Takeda Nobumoto
  - Takeda Nobukado (1529-1582)
  - Matsuo Nobukore (ca. 1530s-1571)
  - Takeda Souchi
  - Takeda Nobuzane (ca. 1530s-1575)
- Sisters:
  - Joukei-in (1519-1550), married Imagawa Yoshimoto
  - Nanshou-in (born 1520) married Anayama Nobutomo
  - Nene (1528-1543) married Suwa Yorishige
