= Siege of Kannomine =

- Part of the Sengoku period
Date	1554
Location	Kannomine, Shinano Province, Japan
Result	Takeda victory
Territorial changes	Kannomine falls to the Takeda

Belligerents
Forces of Takeda Shingen	Kannomine castle garrison

Commanders and leaders
Takeda Shingen	Chiku Yoritomo

Strength
6,000	1,900

The 1554 siege of Kannomine was one of many battles fought in Takeda Shingen's campaign to seize control of Shinano Province. This took place during Japan's Sengoku period; Shingen was one of many feudal lords (daimyōs) who battled to gain land and power.

Kannomine was located in the Ina valley in Japan's Shinano province; it was commanded by Yoritomo Chiku, and was taken just prior to the sieges of Matsuo and Yoshioka.
