= Takeda Shrine =

Shinto shrine in Yamanashi Prefecture, Japan

Takeda Shrine 武田神社
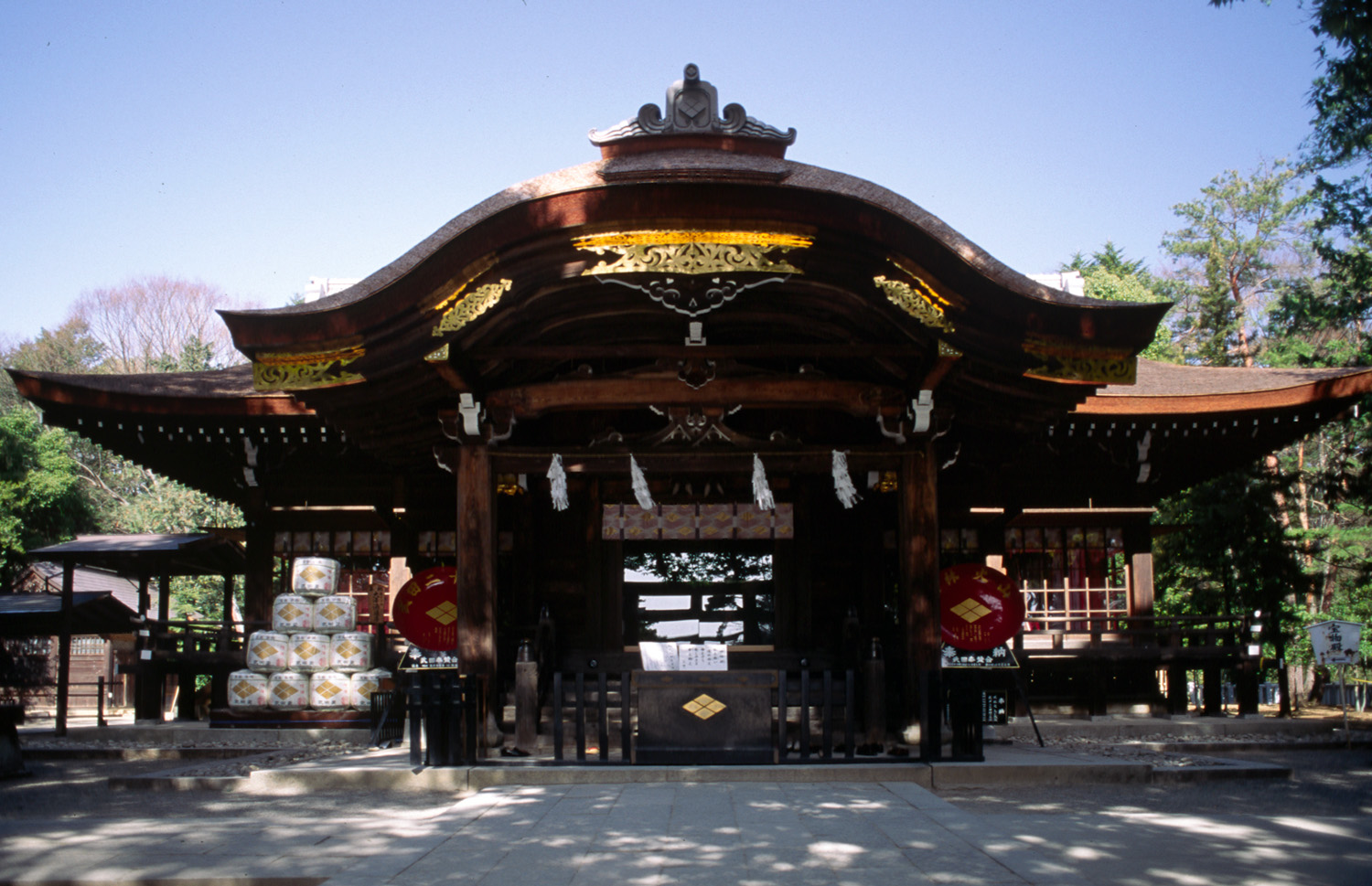
- Takeda Shrine

- Location within Yamanashi Prefecture Location within Japan

Religion
- Affiliation: Shinto
- Deity: Takeda Shingen

Location
- Location: 2611 Kofuchū-machi, Kōfu-shi, Yamanashi-ken
- Interactive map of Takeda Shrine 武田神社
- Coordinates: 35°41′12.75″N 138°34′38.9″E

Architecture
- Established: 1919

Website
- www.takedajinja.or.jp

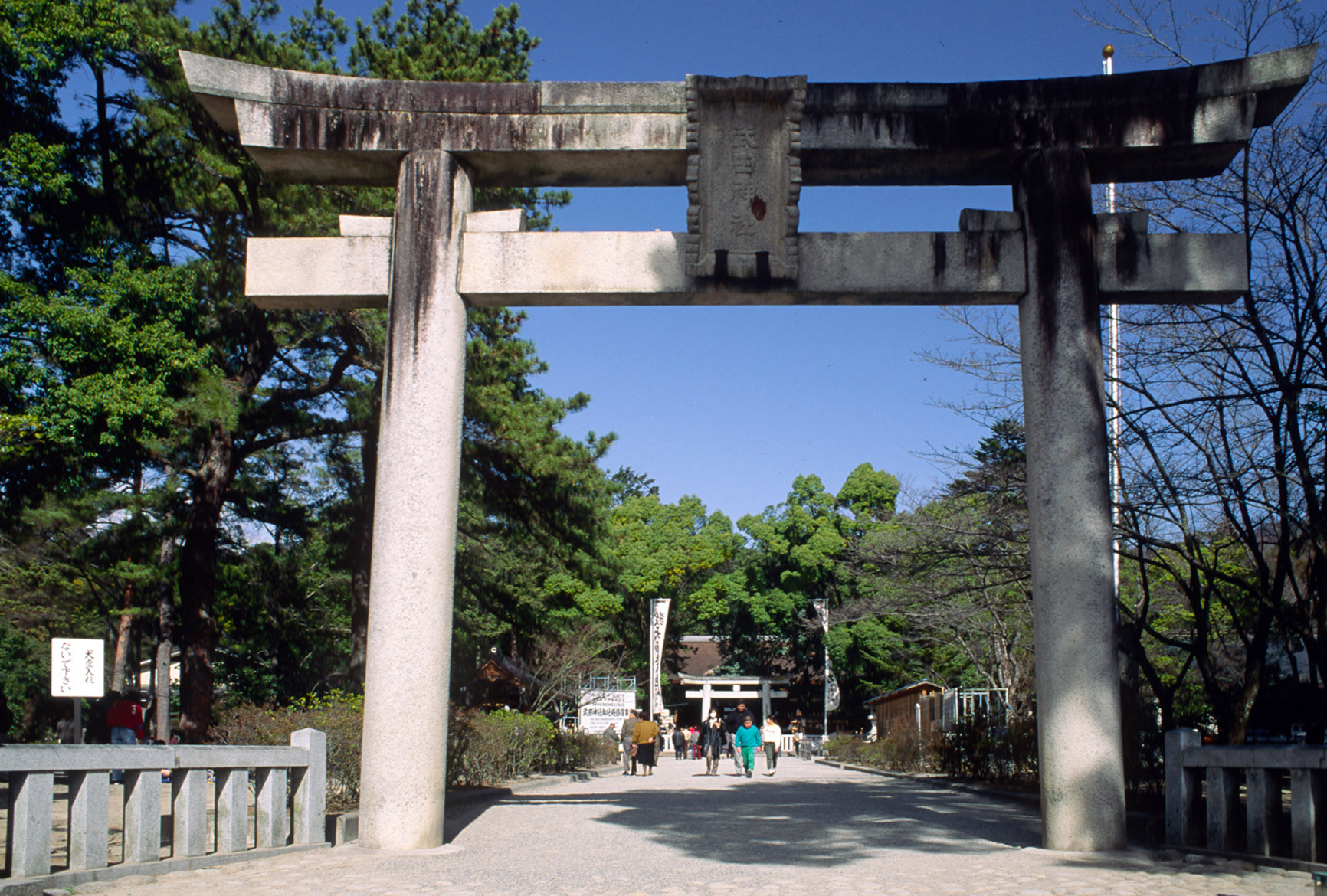
Main gate to Takeda Shrine

Takeda Shrine (武田神社, Takeda Jinja) is a Shinto shrine located in the city of Kōfu, Yamanashi Prefecture, Japan, dedicated to the kami of Takeda Shingen. The shrine's annual celebration is on April 12, Shingen's death anniversary.

== History ==
Following the defeat of the Takeda clan during the Sengoku period, the Tsutsujigasaki fortified residence of Takeda Shingen was allowed to fall into ruins, and the center of Kōfu shifted south to surround Kōfu Castle, the center of administrative power under the Tokugawa shogunate. After the Meiji Restoration, the Tsutsujigasaki ruins came under government protection for their historic value and were eventually made a National Historic Monument of Japan.

Following the visit of Emperor Meiji to Yamanashi Prefecture in 1880, a local movement developed for a shrine to honor the loyalists who had served in the Boshin War. This dovetailed with the State Shintō projects to erect shrines dedicated to historic figures noted for their martial prowess and with the need for a shrine to honor the war dead of the Russo-Japanese War. In 1915, Emperor Taishō commissioned the shrine, which was completed in 1919. The shrine was ranked as a Prefectural Shrine under the Modern system of ranked Shinto Shrines before World War II. The shrine grounds contain a museum, in which numerous artifacts pertaining to Takeda Shingen, including armor, weapons, battle standards, and personal effects, are displayed.

== Cultural properties ==
=== National Important Cultural Property ===
The Takeda Shrine owns a tachi Japanese sword presented to Yamanashi Prefecture by Sanjō Sanetomi to commemorate the visit by Emperor Meiji in 1880. The sword had passed into the Sanjō clan as part of the bridal gifts from the Takeda clan when Lady Sanjō married Takeda Shingen, and dates from the late Kamakura period. It has a length of 64.5 cm and a width of 2.9 cm. The sword is attributed to the noted swordsmith Yoshioka Ichimonji from Bizen, although its half has only the kanji for "ichi" graved upon it. The sword is a National Important Cultural Property.

== See also ==
- Takeda Shingen
