= Siege of Ryūgasaki =

1545 siege

- Part of the Sengoku period
| Date | 1545 |
| Location | Ryūgasaki, Shinano Province, near Lake Suwa |
| Result | Takeda victory |

Belligerents
| Forces loyal to Tozawa Yorichika | Takeda family forces |

Commanders and leaders
| Yoshinaga Mitoyoshi † | Takeda Shingen |

Strength
| 2,500 | 3,200 |

Casualties and losses
| Unknown | Unknown |

The 1545 siege of Ryūgasaki was one of many battles fought by Takeda Shingen in his bid to control Shinano Province during Japan's Sengoku period. The fortress was a satellite castle of Fukuyo, and was held by Tozawa retainer Yoshinaga Mitoyoshi. Yoshinaga himself was killed in battle while the fortress fell.
