= Hiraga Genshin =

Japanese samurai

Hiraga Genshin (平賀 源信; died 1536) was a retainer to the Takeda family towards the beginning of Japan's Sengoku period (1467–1615). He was attacked by Takeda Nobutora at Un no Kuchi in 1536, and forced Nobutora to retreat. But Nobutora's son, Takeda Shingen, then 15 years old, and called 'Takeda Harunobu', rallied the Takeda forces and led them to victory, killing Hiraga in the process.
