= Siege of Kuragano =

- Part of the Sengoku period
Date	1565
Location	Kuragano, Kōzuke Province 36°17′48″N 139°02′52″E
Result	Siege succeeds; Takeda victory
Territorial changes	Kuragano falls to Takeda Shingen

Belligerents
forces of Takeda Shingen	Kuragano garrison

Commanders and leaders
Takeda Shingen	Kuragano Naoyuki

Strength
6,800	5,000

The 1565 siege of Kuragano was one of many battles fought during Takeda Shingen's quest for power during Japan's Sengoku period. Kuragano castle, in Kōzuke Province, and held by Kuragano Naoyuki, withstood siege by Shingen in 1561, but fell four years later.
