= Takeda Nobuchika =

Takeda Nobuchika (武田 信親), also known as Unno Nobuchika (海野 信親) (1541–1582) was the second son of Takeda Shingen. He lived during the Sengoku period in Japan. He was born completely blind and therefore could not become a retainer of the Takeda clan. Instead, Shingen named Nobuchika heir to the Unno clan of Shinano province, in order to further expand his influence.

When the Oda/Tokugawa alliance invaded Kai province in 1582, Nobuchika committed suicide by taking hemlock. Tokugawa Ieyasu, who had felt sympathy towards Nobuchika, protected his son from harm after his death.
