= Siege of Kojinyama =

1544 siege

- Part of the Sengoku period
| Date | 1544 |
| Location | Kojinyama fortress, Shinano Province |
| Result | Takeda victory |

Belligerents
| forces of Takeda Shingen | forces of Tozawa family |

Commanders and leaders
| Takeda Shingen | Tozawa Yorichika |

Strength
| 2,000 | 2,000 |

In the 1544 siege of Kojinyama, Takeda Shingen continued his invasion of Shinano Province's Ima Valley, seizing Kojinyama fortress from the Tozawa family.
