= Lady Sanjō =

Japanese noblewomen (1521–1570)

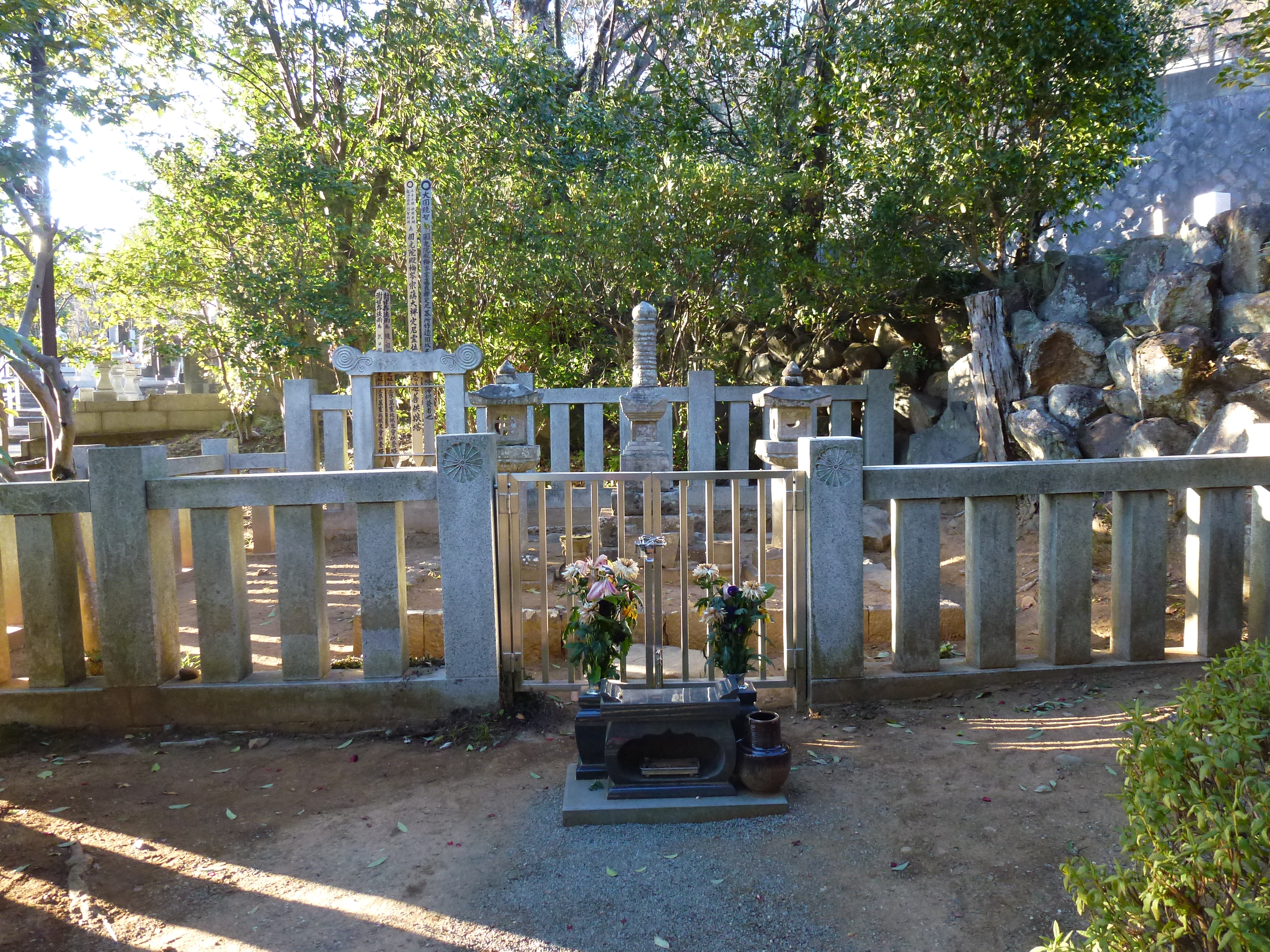
Lady Sanjo's grave at the Enkoin Temple.

Lady Sanjō (三条の方, Sanjō no kata) (1521 – August 29, 1570) was a Japanese noblewoman who lived during the Sengoku period. She was the wife of the daimyo, Takeda Shingen. Her name is unknown and records only refer to her as Lady Sanjō.

== Biography ==
Lady Sanjō came from the noble kuge Sanjō family. Her father was Sanjō Kinyori, a court noble of Kyoto who was a retainer of the Takeda clan. There were five children in the family: two sons and three daughters. Lady Sanjō's sisters married Hosokawa Harumoto and Honganji Kennyo, respectively.

Lady Sanjō married Takeda Shingen (then named Takeda Harunobu) at age 16. She gave birth to three sons and two daughters. In this respect, she was more of a person with a keen interest in culture than the daimyo, feudal warlords like Shingen. However, Shingen granted her her own temple, and she quickly established an influential society and a network of key decision makers in Kofu. It is said that she had a very strong connection with Shingen which increased her interest in art, Buddhism and Chinese scriptures.

== Other references ==
A modern-day reincarnation of Lady Sanjō appears in the light novel and anime series, Mirage of Blaze. She is one of the secondary characters and member of the Takeda Netherworld Force. A character named Lady Sanjo also appears as a minor character in the 2020 video game Ghost of Tsushima.

The courtier and memoirist Gofukakusa'in Nijō was also recorded to have been referred to as Lady Sanjō after falling from favor in 1283.

The character Miku Nakano from the 5Toubun no Hanayome series draws inspiration from her, not only in name (spelling) but also with the character's phone case having the Takeda crest on it throughout the series.
