= Siege of Nagakubo =

1543 siege

Coordinates: 36.2702°N 138.2686°E

- Part of the Sengoku period
Date	1543
Location	Nagakubo, Shinano Province
Result	Takeda victory

Belligerents
Forces of Oi Sadataka	Takeda clan

Commanders and leaders
Oi Sadataka	Takeda Shingen

Strength
1,200	3,000

The siege of Nagakubo (長窪城) was a battle of Japan's Sengoku period. It took place in 1543 as part of Takeda Shingen's bid to control Shinano Province, Japan. He took the castle of his former ally, Oi Sadataka, who had deserted him to ally with Murakami Yoshikiyo. Sadataka was sent to Shingen's home city of Kōfu as a prisoner, where he was then killed.
