= Siege of Matsuo =

- Part of the Sengoku period
| Date | 1554 |
| Location | Ina valley, Shinano Province, Japan |
| Result | Takeda victory |
| Territorial changes | Matsuo and Yoshioka castles fall to Takeda Shingen |

Belligerents
| Forces of Takeda Shingen | Castle garrisons |

Commanders and leaders
| Takeda Shingen | Ogasawara Nobusada |

Strength
| 4,500 | 4,000 |

The 1554 siege of Matsuo was one of many sieges undertaken by the daimyō Takeda Shingen in his campaign to conquer Japan's Shinano Province. This took place during Japan's Sengoku period, in which feudal lords (daimyōs) vied for control of fiefdoms across the country.

Matsuo Castle, in the Ina valley, was controlled by Ogasawara Nobusada; after defeating him, Shingen went on to seize the nearby Yoshioka Castle as well.
