= Siege of Uehara =

1541 siege

- Part of the Sengoku period
Date	1542
Location	Uehara, Shinano Province 36°00′32″N 138°08′56″E
Result	Takeda victory

Belligerents
Forces of Suwa Yorishige	Takeda forces

Commanders and leaders
Suwa Yorishige	Takeda Shingen

Strength
1,000	5,000

Casualties and losses
300	10
- Location within Nagano Prefecture Siege of Uehara (Japan)

The siege of Uehara was the first of many steps taken by Takeda Shingen in his bid to seize control of Shinano Province. Uehara Castle had been controlled by Suwa Yorishige before it was taken by Shingen.
