= Battle of Un no Kuchi =

Japanese battle in 1536

- Part of the Sengoku period
Date	1536
Location	Un no Kuchi, Shinano province 36°02′13″N 138°29′44″E
Result	Takeda victory

Belligerents
Forces of Hiraga Genshin	Takeda clan

Commanders and leaders
Hiraga Genshin †	Takeda Nobutora; Takeda Harunobu

Strength
Over 1,000	8,000
- Location within Nagano Prefecture Battle of Un no Kuchi (Japan)

The Battle of Un no Kuchi (referred to in Japanese as 海ノ口城, un no kuchi jou, literally Un no Kuchi Castle) in 1536 was the first major victory for Takeda Harunobu, aged fifteen at the time. He would later take on the name Takeda Shingen, and grow to become one of Japan's most famous warlords.

== Battle ==
Harunobu's father, Takeda Nobutora, attacked Hiraga Genshin in his fortress at Un no Kuchi, but was forced to retreat. Harunobu, at the rear of the withdrawing forces, waited until they were clear of the fortress, and then turned around, leading his men to defeat a castle garrison which was caught unprepared, having seen the Takeda flee.

== Aftermath ==
Shingen usurped his father as leader of the Takeda in 1541, and resolved to outdo Nobutora by conquering Shinano. He invaded the province in 1542 and ultimately spent over two decades fighting there.
