= Takeda Yoshinobu =

Japanese daimyo

Takeda Yoshinobu

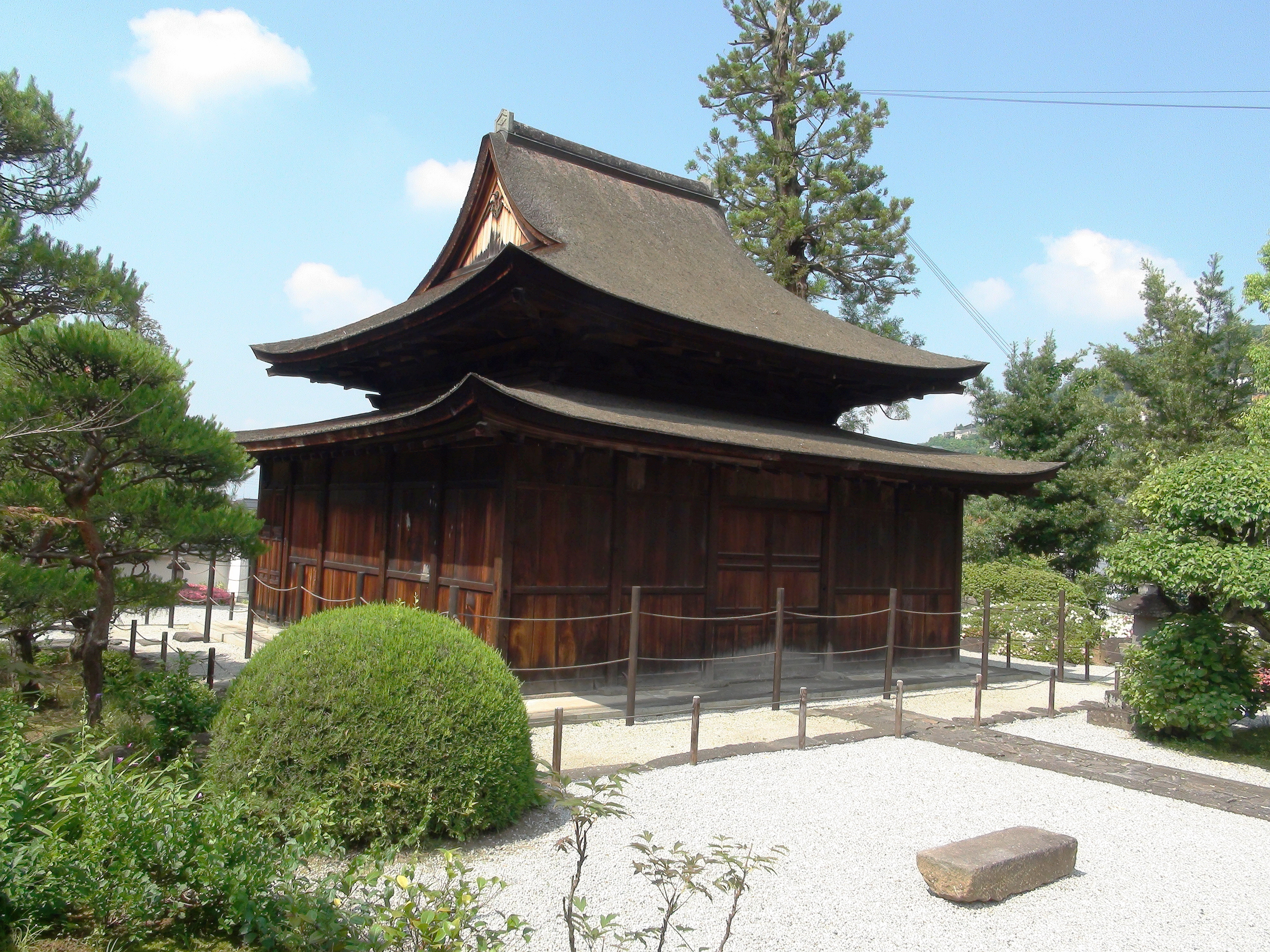
Toukouji Temple where Yoshinobu was imprisoned

Takeda Yoshinobu (武田 義信, 1538 – November 19, 1567) was a Japanese daimyō of the Sengoku period.

== Life ==
Born Takeda Tarō (武田 太郎), he was the son of Takeda Shingen, by Shingen's wife, Lady Sanjō (三条夫人, real name unknown). He came of age in 1550, and took the formal name of Yoshinobu, receiving the "yoshi" from the 13th Ashikaga shōgun, Ashikaga Yoshiteru.

In 1552, in order to further strengthen the bond between Takeda and Imagawa, he married the daughter of Imagawa Yoshimoto. Yoshinobu served as an illegitimate son for a time, but rebelled against his father and was captured and imprisoned along with Obu Toramasa. Toramasa, who was an educator, was forced to commit seppuku and he was also executed. This is because Yoshinobu objected to invasion of Suruga (Imagawa clan). Yoshinobu's nephew Nobukatsu (son of his half-brother Katsuyori) replaced him as lord of the Takeda clan who also was responsible for his death.

== source ==
- Hirayama Yuu『third Takeda』
