= Suwa Yorishige (daimyo) =

Japanese samurai and head of the Suwa clan

Suwa Yorishige (諏訪頼重) (1516–1544) was a Japanese samurai, daimyo (military lord) of Shinano province and head of the Suwa clan. He was defeated by Takeda Shingen, and his daughter Suwa Goryōnin (諏訪御料人, real name unknown) was taken as Shingen's concubine. She later gave birth to the Takeda clan heir Takeda Katsuyori.

Suwa Yorishige fought Takeda Nobutora in the 1531 Battle of Shiokawa no gawara. Suwa Yorishige was then defeated by Takeda Shingen in the 1542 Battle of Sezawa and the Siege of Uehara. Following the Siege of Kuwabara, he committed suicide.
