= Anayama Nobutomo =

Japanese samurai

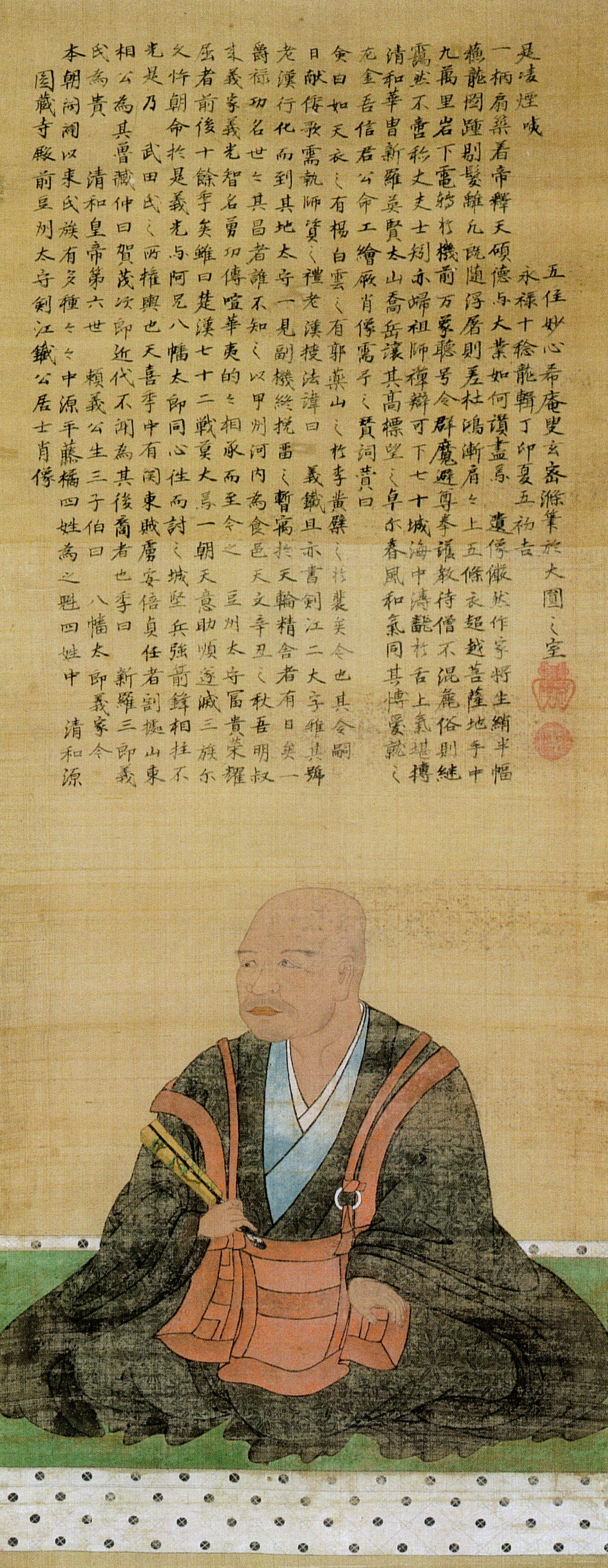
Portrait of Anayama Nobutomo

Anayama Nobutomo (穴山 信友; 1506 – January 1, 1561) was a Japanese samurai and of the Sengoku period. He was the son of Anayama Nobutsuna. Nobutomo served the Takeda clan of Kai Province and held the title of Izu-no-kami (伊豆守), or Defender of Izu.

He enjoyed special status in the Takeda retainer band due to his marriage to Takeda Nobutora's daughter. Nobutomo fought with distinction during the attack on Suwa Yorishige in 1542 under command of lord Takeda Shingen. After his death on New Year's Day 1561, he was succeeded by his son Anayama Nobutada.

Nobutomo's grave can be found at Enzō-in Temple of Yamanashi Prefecture.
