= Takeda Shingen =

Japanese samurai and daimyo (1521–1573)

- 武田 信玄
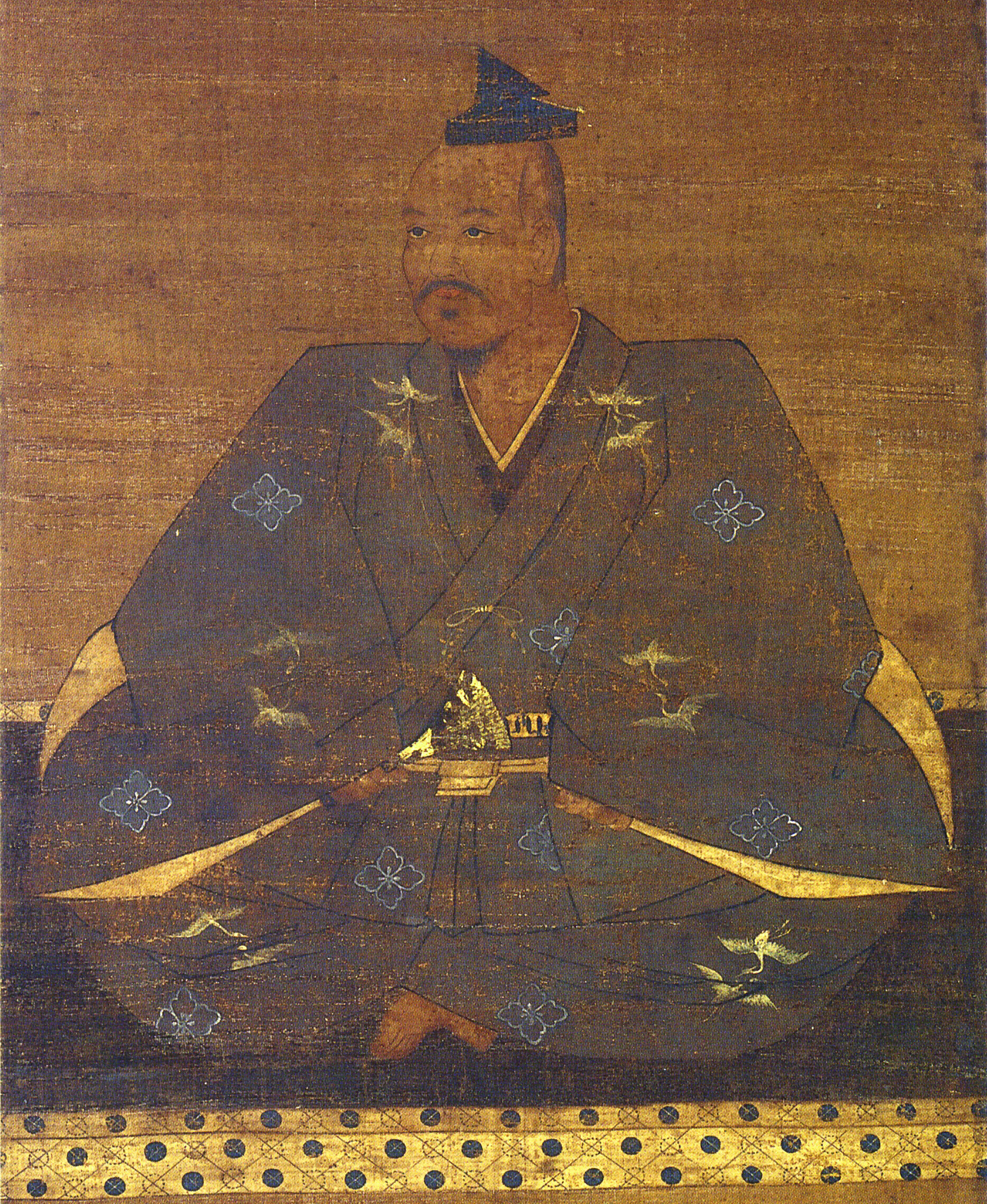

Head of Takeda clan
- In office 1541–1573
- Preceded by: Takeda Nobutora
- Succeeded by: Takeda Katsuyori

Personal details
- Born: Katsuchiyo; December 1, 1521 Kai Province, Japan
- Died: May 13, 1573 (aged 51) Mikawa Province, Japan
- Spouse: Lady Sanjō
- Domestic partner: Suwa Goryōnin (concubine)
- Children: Takeda Yoshinobu; Takeda Nobuchika; Takeda Katsuyori; Nishina Morinobu; Matsuhime
- Parents: Takeda Nobutora (father); Ōi no Kata (mother)
- Relatives: Takeda Nobushige (brother); Takeda Nobukado (brother); Takeda Nobuzane (brother); Ichijō Nobutatsu (brother); Imagawa Yoshimoto (brother-in-law); Anayama Nobutomo (brother-in-law)
- Nickname(s): "Tiger of Kai" "Tendai no Zasu Shamon Shingen"

Military service
- Allegiance: Takeda clan
- Rank: Lord (Daimyo)
- Unit: Takeda clan
- Commands: Tsutsujigasaki Castle
- Battles/wars: Battle of Un no Kuchi; Battle of Sezawa; Siege of Uehara; Siege of Kuwabara; Siege of Fukuyo; Battle of Ankokuji; Siege of Nagakubo; Siege of Takatō; Siege of Ryūgasaki; Battle of Odaihara; Siege of Shika Castle; Battle of Uedahara; Battle of Shiojiritoge; Siege of Katsurao; Battles of Kawanakajima; Siege of Kannomine; Siege of Matsuo; Siege of Matsuyama; Siege of Minowa; Siege of Hachigata; Siege of Odawara; Battle of Mimasetoge; Battle of Tonegawa; Battle of Mikatagahara; Siege of Noda Castle

Takeda Shingen (武田 信玄; December 1, 1521 – May 13, 1573) was a Japanese samurai and daimyō of the Sengoku period. Known as the "Tiger of Kai", he was one of the most powerful daimyō of the late Sengoku period and was credited with exceptional military prestige. Despite being based in Kai Province, a poor area with little arable land and no access to the sea, he became one of Japan's leading daimyō. His skills are highly esteemed and on par with Mōri Motonari.

== Name ==
Shingen's childhood names were Tarō (太郎), indicating that he was the eldest son, and Katsuchiyo (勝千代). After his genpuku (coming-of-age ceremony), he was given the formal name Harunobu (晴信), which included a character from the name of Ashikaga Yoshiharu, the twelfth shogun of the Ashikaga shogunate. It was a common practice in feudal Japan for a higher-ranking samurai to bestow a character from his own name to his inferiors as a symbol of recognition. From a jizamurai's perspective, it was an honor to receive a character from the shogunate, although the authority of the latter had greatly degenerated by the mid-16th century.

Both the Ashikaga and the Takeda descended from the Minamoto clan. Technically, Harunobu, as well as his forefathers, had borne the surname of Minamoto. Therefore, Harunobu is referred to as Minamoto no Harunobu (源 晴信) in official records kept by the Imperial Court when he was conferred the official title of Master of the Palace Table (大膳大夫, Daizen Daibu). The Imperial Court had maintained a ritsuryō system parallel to the shogunate apparatus.

In February 1559, Harunobu chose to live a pravrajyā (semi-monastic) life as a Buddhist novitiate monk and received a dharma name, Shingen (信玄)), from his Buddhist teacher. This pronunciation follows the on'yomi system of Chinese loanwords. However, the same kanji can also be read as "Nobuharu" using the kun'yomi system, which is the inversion of his official name, Harunobu. In ancient times, such religious names of recognised kuge (aristocracy) were pronounced according to the on'yomi system rather than the kun'yomi one. Although widely known by his dharma name, Shingen's formal name remained Harunobu throughout his life.

Shingen is sometimes referred to as the "Tiger of Kai" (甲斐の虎) for his martial prowess on the battlefield. His primary rival, Uesugi Kenshin (上杉謙信), was often called the "Dragon of Echigo (越後の龍) or the "Tiger of Echigo" (越後の虎). They fought several times in the Battles of Kawanakajima.

== Early life and rise ==
Shingen was the first-born son of Takeda Nobutora (武田信虎), leader of the Takeda clan, and daimyō of Kai province. He had been an accomplished poet in his youth. He assisted his father with the older relatives and vassals of the Takeda clan, and became a valuable addition to the clan at a fairly young age. In 1536, at the age of 15, he was instrumental in helping his father win the Battle of Un no Kuchi.

At some point in his life after his coming-of-age ceremony, Shingen decided to rebel against his father, Takeda Nobutora. He succeeded in 1540, taking control of the clan. Events regarding this change of leadership are not entirely clear, but it is thought that Nobutora had planned to name his second son, Takeda Nobushige, as his heir instead of Shingen. The result was a miserable retirement that was forced upon him by Shingen and his supporters: he was sent to Suruga Province, on the southern border of Kai, to be kept in custody under the scrutiny of the Imagawa clan, led by his son-in-law Imagawa Yoshimoto (今川義元), the daimyō of Suruga. For their help in this bloodless coup, an alliance was formed between the Imagawa and Takeda clans.

== Takeda campaigns ==
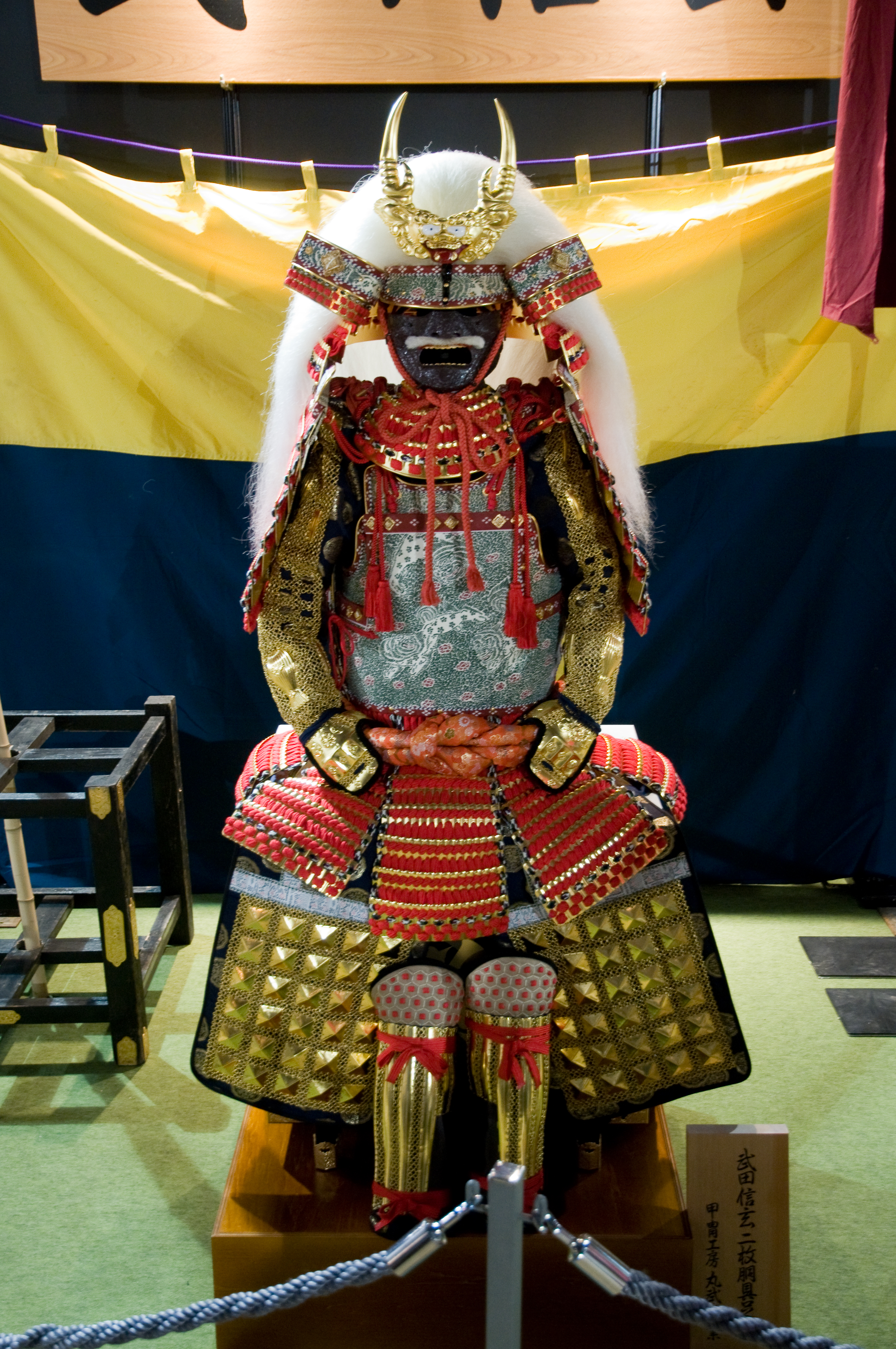
A modern reproduction of Takeda Shingen's armour

=== Shinano campaign ===
Shingen's first act was to gain a hold of the area around him. His goal was to conquer Shinano Province. A number of the major warlords in the Shinano region marched on the border of Kai Province, hoping to neutralise the power of the still young Shingen before he had a chance to expand into their lands. However, planning to beat him down at Fuchu (where word had it Shingen was gathering his forces for a stand), they were unprepared when Takeda forces suddenly came down upon them at the Battle of Sezawa. Taking advantage of their confusion, Shingen was able to win a quick victory, which set the stage for his drive into Shinano lands that same year and his successful Siege of Uehara. The young warlord made considerable advances into the region, conquering the Suwa clan's headquarters in the Siege of Kuwabara, before moving into central Shinano with the defeat of both Tozawa Yorichika and Takato Yoritsugu in the Siege of Fukuyo and the Battle of Ankokuji. In 1543, he captured Nagakubo Castle, Kojinyama Castle in 1544, and then Takatō Castle and Ryūgasaki Castle in 1545. In 1546, he took Uchiyama Castle and won the Battle of Odaihara, and in 1547, he took Shika Castle.

In 1548, Shingen defeated Ogasawara Nagatoki in the Battle of Shiojiritoge and then took Fukashi Castle in 1550. However, the warlord was checked at Uedahara by Murakami Yoshikiyo, losing two of his generals in a heated battle that Murakami won. Shingen managed to avenge this loss and the Murakami clan was eventually defeated in the sieges of Toishi. Murakami fled the region, eventually coming to plead for help from Echigo Province.

In 1553, he captured the castles of Katsurao, Wada, Takashima and Fukuda, and in 1554, he took the castles of Fukushima, Kannomine and Matsuo.

=== Conflict with the Uesugi ===
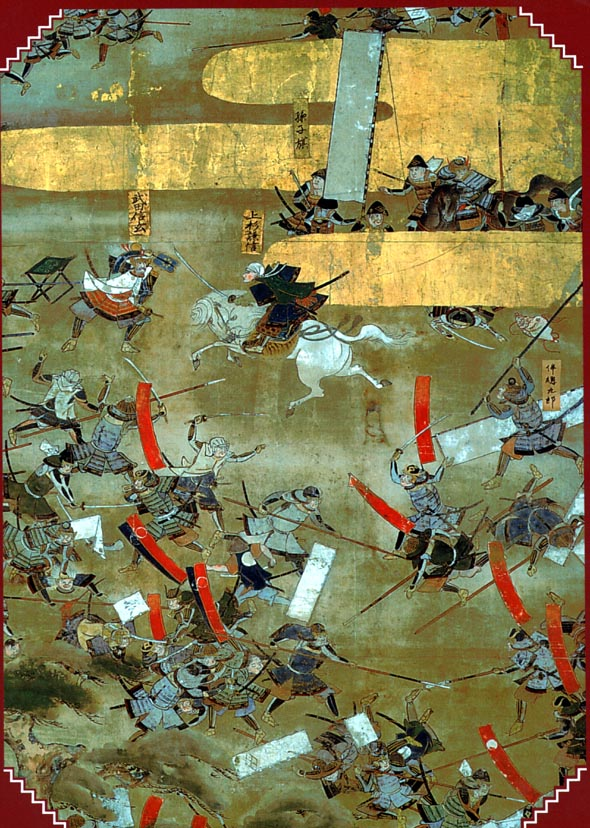
Depiction of the legendary personal conflict between Uesugi Kenshin and Takeda Shingen at the fourth Battle of Kawanakajima (1561)

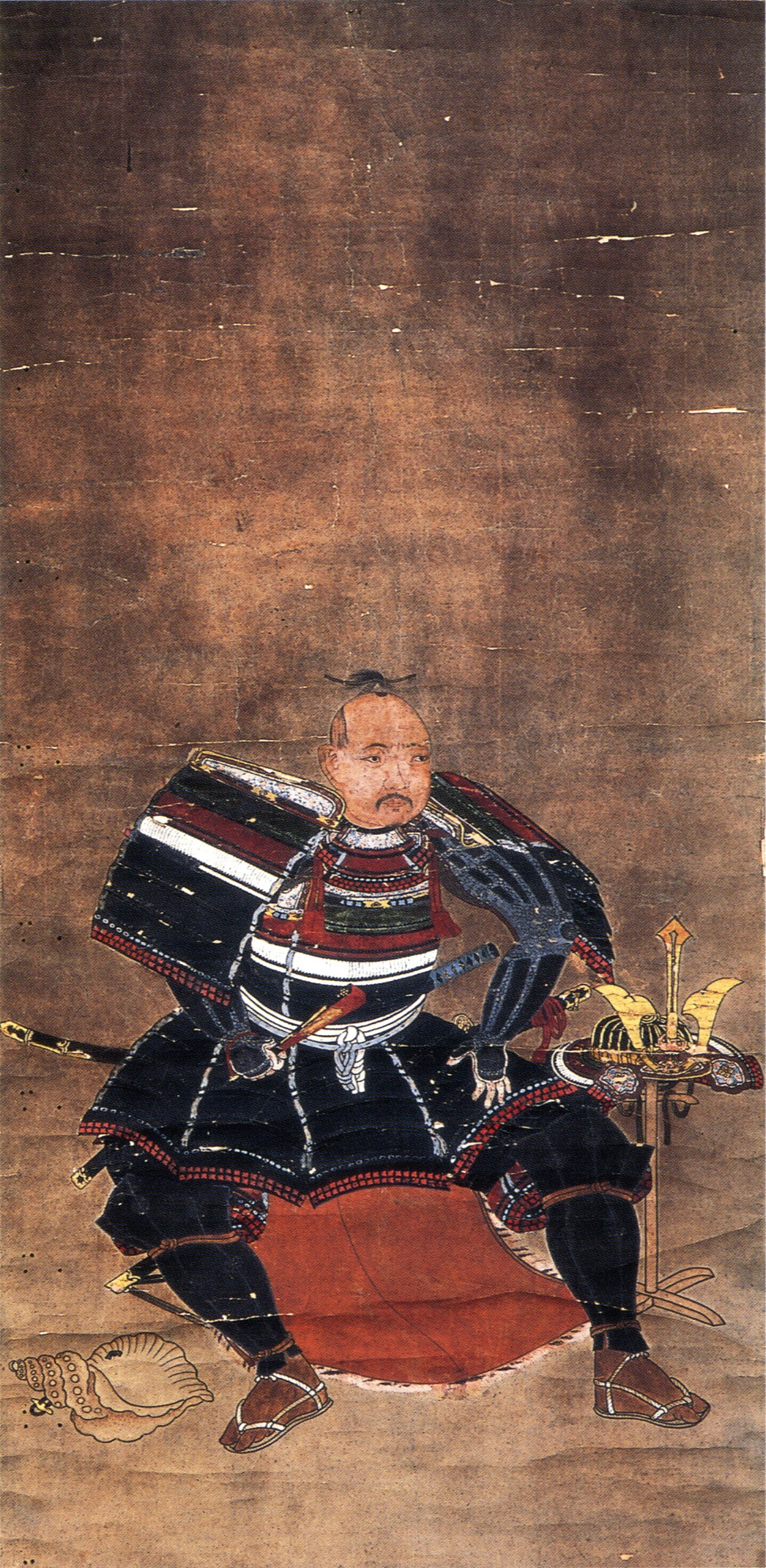
Portrait of Takeda Shingen

After conquering Shinano Province, Shingen faced another rival, Uesugi Kenshin of Echigo Province. The feud between them became legendary, and they faced each other on the battlefield five times in the Battles of Kawanakajima.

These battles were generally confined to controlled skirmishes, with neither daimyō willing to devote himself entirely to a single all-out attempt. The battle between the two that had the fiercest fighting, and might have decided victory or defeat for one side or the other, was the fourth battle, during which the famous tale arose of Kenshin's forces clearing a path through the Takeda troops and Kenshin engaging Shingen in single combat. The tale has Kenshin attacking Shingen with his sword while Shingen defends with his iron war fan. Both lords lost many men in this fight, and Shingen in particular lost two of his leading generals, Yamamoto Kansuke and his younger brother Takeda Nobushige.

After the fourth Battle of Kawanakajima, the Takeda clan suffered two internal setbacks. Shingen uncovered two plots on his life, the first from his cousin Suwa Shigemasa (whom he ordered to commit seppuku), and the second, a few years later, from his own son Takeda Yoshinobu (武田義信). His son was confined to Tōkō Temple, where he died two years later. It is unknown whether his death was natural or ordered by his father.

After this incident, Shingen designated his fourth son, Takeda Katsuyori (武田勝頼), as the acting assistant clan leader until Katsuyori's son came of age.

=== Kōzuke campaign ===
In 1563, Shingen allied with Hōjō Ujiyasu, and helped Ujiyasu capture Matsuyama Castle in Musashi Province. In 1565, Shingen then took Kuragano Castle and Minowa Castle in Kōzuke Province.

In 1571, Uesugi Kenshin had advanced to Kōzuke and attacked the Shingen's satellite castle, Ishikura Castle. Both forces met each other in the Battle of Tonegawa, but eventually disengaged after a well-fought battle.

=== Suruga campaign ===
The death of Takeda Yoshinobu is believed to have much to do with the change in Shingen's policy towards the Imagawa clan. After Imagawa Yoshimoto's death in the Battle of Okehazama against Oda Nobunaga in 1560, Shingen made alliances with the Oda and Tokugawa clans, and started to plan an invasion of Suruga Province, a territory now controlled by Yoshimoto's son, Ujizane. Yoshinobu, however, had strongly opposed such a plan because his wife was the daughter of Yoshimoto. By 1567, nonetheless, after Shingen had successfully kept the forces led by Uesugi Kenshin out of the northern boundaries of Shinano Province, taken over a strategically important castle in western Kōzuke, and suppressed internal objection to his plans to take advantage of the weakened Imagawa clan, he was ready to carry out his planned Suruga invasion. Shingen and Tokugawa Ieyasu came to terms and occupied the former Imagawa territory. They both fought against Yoshimoto's heir, Imagawa Ujizane.

During this time, Shingen also ordered the damming of the Fuji River, which was one of the major domestic activities of the time.

=== Predicament ===
The Suruga invasion angered Hōjō Ujiyasu. After confirming that the Takeda and Hōjō alliance had collapsed, Tokugawa Ieyasu gave up on the Takeda clan, and approached the Uesugi and Hōjō clans. As a consequence, Shingen was in a difficult situation with enemies on three sides. In such a predicament, Shingen asked his ally Oda Nobunaga for help. Nobunaga soothed Ieyasu and mediated reconciliation between the Takeda and Uesugi clans. Thanks to Nobunaga's efforts, Shingen was able to escape from the predicament.

=== Conflict with the Hōjō ===
In 1568, as a response to Hōjō intervention in his invasion of Suruga Province, Shingen broke his alliance with the Hōjō clan, and came into Musashi Province from his home province of Kai, attacking Takiyama Castle. He then moved against the Hōjō by attacking Hachigata Castle, then engaged in the Siege of Odawara (1569). He burned the castle town of Odawara Castle, then successfully withdrew after Hōjō Ujiteru and Hōjō Ujikuni failed to stop him in the Battle of Mimasetoge.

After defeating the intervention forces commanded by Hōjō Ujimasa of Sagami Province, Shingen finally secured Suruga Province, formerly the base of the prestigious Imagawa clan, as a Takeda asset in 1569.

At this point, Shingen now had Kai Province, Shinano Province, the western part of Kōzuke Province, Musashi Province, and Suruga Province.

=== Conflict with the Oda–Tokugawa alliance ===
By the time Shingen was 49 years old, he was the only daimyō with the necessary power and tactical skills to stop Oda Nobunaga's rush to rule Japan.

Shingen believed that the "Nobunaga Encirclement Plan" was functioning to some extent, and he judged that if he joined, he could drive the Oda clan to ruin. Upon learning that the Takeda clan had joined the "Nobunaga Encirclement Plan", Uesugi Kenshin sent a letter to his retainers stating, "Shingen has poked his hand into a hornet's nest. He is finished. This is fortunate for our Uesugi clan."

In 1572, after the Takeda had secured control over Suruga, northern Shinano, and western Kōzuke, forces of Shingen under the command of Akiyama Nobutomo advanced into Mino Province, and took the Oda's Iwamura Castle, which caused the relationship between the Takeda and Oda clans to decline. Later, Shingen engaged Tokugawa Ieyasu's forces and captured the Tokugawa's Futamata Castle.

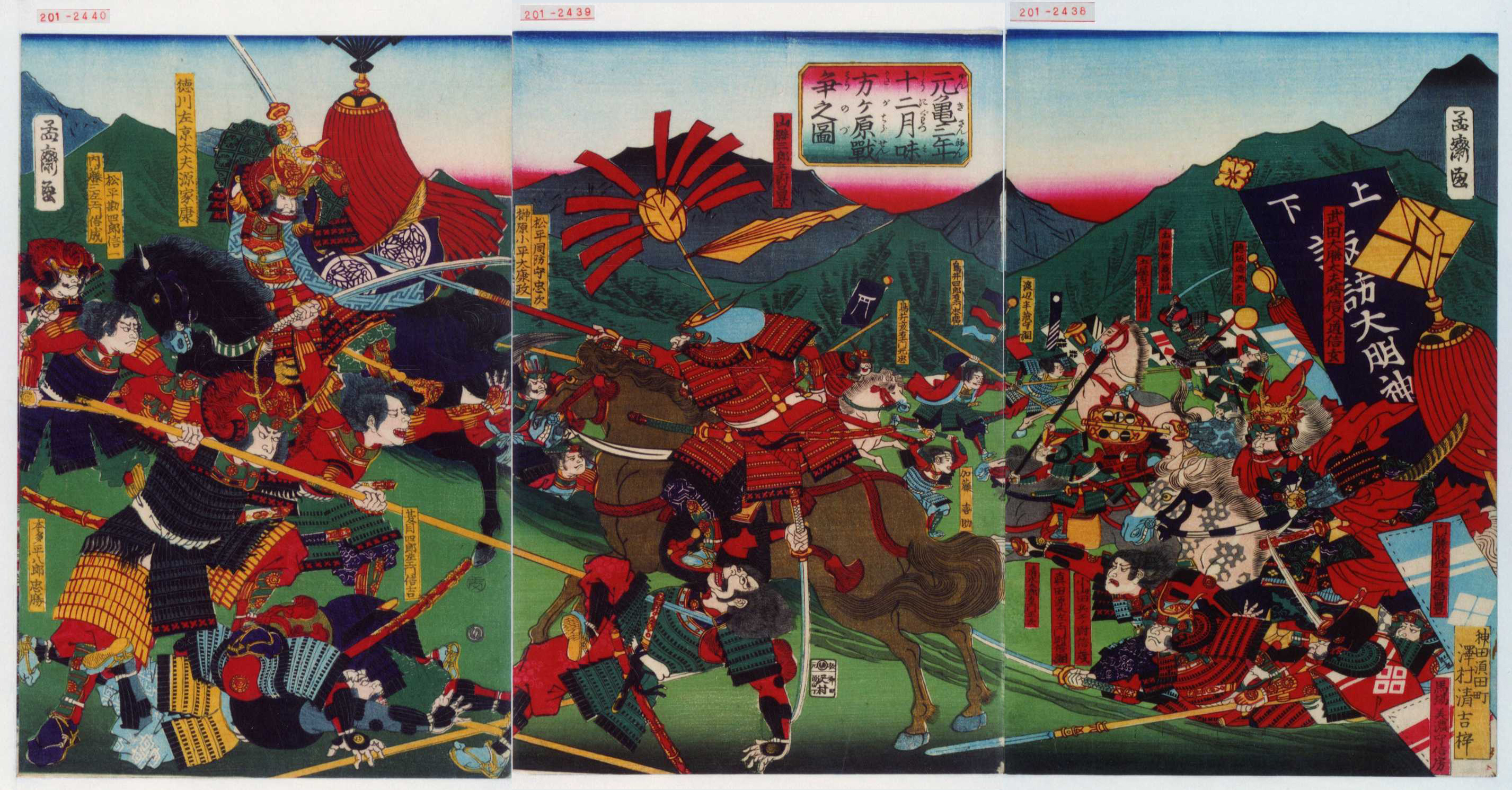
Ukiyo-e of the Battle of Mikatagahara

In 1573, Shingen decided to march on Kyoto at the urging of the shōgun Ashikaga Yoshiaki. While seeking a route from Kōfu to Kyoto, Shingen moved to challenge the Oda–Tokugawa alliance in the Battle of Mikatagahara, the most famous battle of Shingen's campaigns, and one of the best demonstrations of his cavalry-based tactics. It was also one of Tokugawa Ieyasu's worst defeats, and complete disaster was only narrowly averted. Shingen stopped his advance temporarily due to outside influences, which allowed the Tokugawa clan to prepare for battle again. Shingen later led a formidable force of over 30,000 men into Mikawa Province.

== Death ==
Once he entered Mikawa Province in 1573, Shingen besieged Noda Castle, but on May 13, 1573, he died at the age of 51. The exact circumstances surrounding his death are unknown. Some accounts say he succumbed to an old war wound, some say a sniper had wounded him earlier, and others that he died of pneumonia. He was buried at Erin-ji temple in what is now Kōshū, Yamanashi.

After Shingen's death, Takeda Katsuyori became the daimyō of the Takeda clan. Katsuyori was ambitious and wanted to continue his father's legacy. He moved to take Tokugawa forts. However, an allied force of Tokugawa Ieyasu and Oda Nobunaga dealt a crushing blow to the Takeda in the Battle of Nagashino, when Nobunaga's matchlock-armed infantry destroyed the Takeda cavalry. Nobunaga and Ieyasu seized the opportunity to defeat the weakened Takeda clan led by Katsuyori. Later, in the Battle of Tenmokuzan, Katsuyori committed suicide after the battle and the Takeda clan never recovered.

== Legacy ==
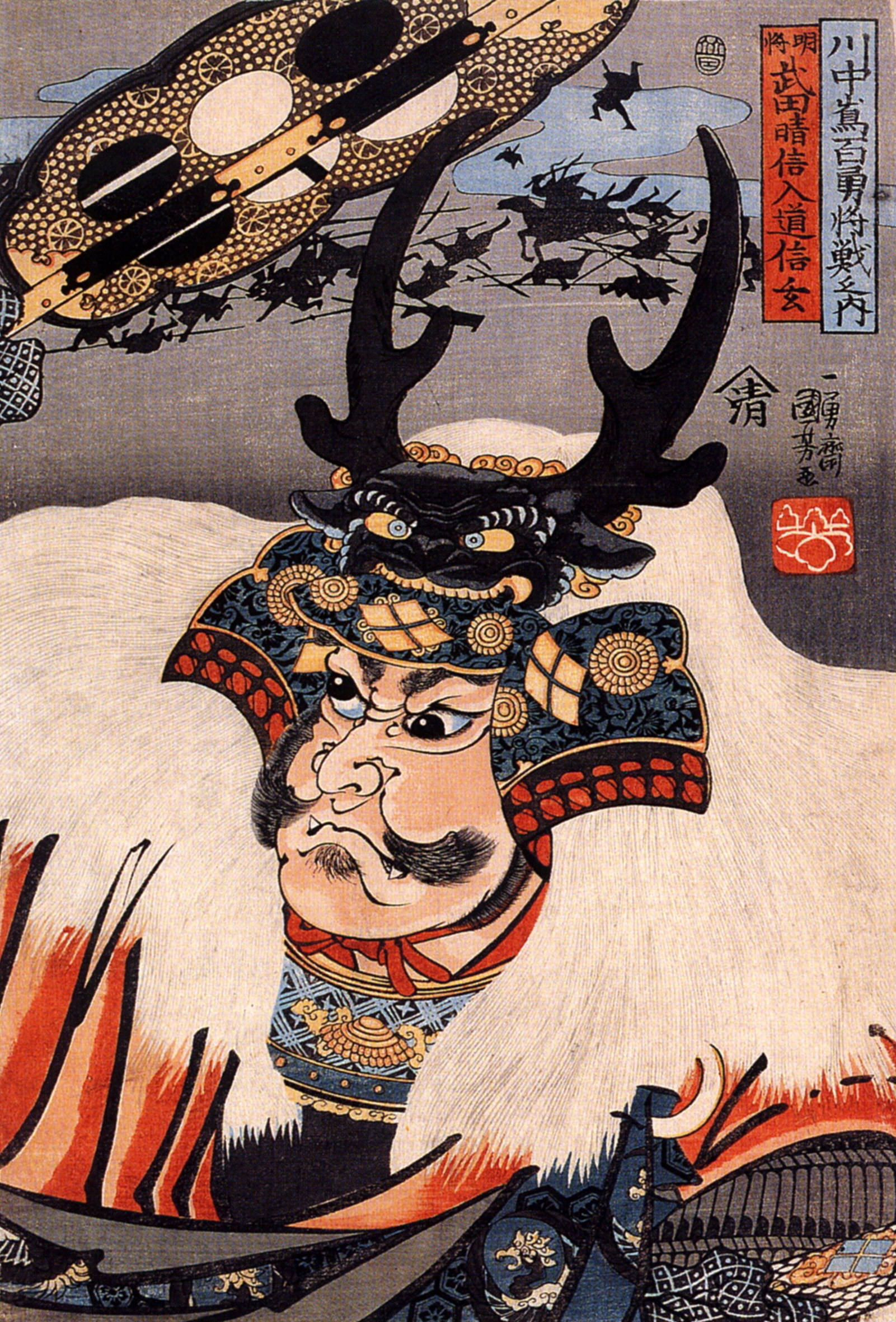
Ukiyo-e of Takeda Shingen by Utagawa Kuniyoshi

Upon Shingen's death, Uesugi Kenshin reportedly wept at the loss of one of his strongest and most deeply-respected rivals. However, historian Kazuto Hongō noted that despite the advantage of advanced military doctrines and administration systems established by Shingen, his efforts failed to prosper the Takeda clan. Hongō stressed the failure of the Takeda clan during Shingen's rule to build a war economy, as he argued that with the 20 years of Shingen's conquest to subjugate Shinano Province, together with his series of exhausting engagements against his rival Uesugi Kenshin, Shingen only managed to secure territories that yielded a gross annual rice production of 600,000 koku as revenue at most, which meant that the Takeda clan could mobilise at maximum only 20,000 soldiers for each campaign. In contrast with Oda Nobunaga, whereas his possession of Mino Province could produce at least 650,000 koku annually, combined with his later provinces, meant that he could mobilise approximately twice as many soldiers as Shingen. Furthermore, while the Takeda controlled only landlocked provinces, Nobunaga had access to the rich and prosperous port city of Sakai, which meant that Nobunaga could afford military technologies and exotic supplies for his war machine far better than that of Shingen.

One of the most lasting tributes to Shingen's prowess was that of Tokugawa Ieyasu himself, who is known to have borrowed heavily from the late Takeda leader's governmental and military innovations after he had taken leadership of Kai Province during Toyotomi Hideyoshi's rise to power. There are two notable moments of the incorporation of Takeda elements into the Tokugawa clan regime. The first was during the Tenshō-Jingo war between Ieyasu and the Hōjō clan at the aftermath of the death of Oda Nobunaga. Ieyasu hid many Takeda followers from Nobunaga, who called for their deaths. Those Takeda vassals immediately declared their allegiance to Ieyasu when the Hōjō and Uesugi clans invaded Kai and Shinano, where at least 800 former Takeda retainers joined the ranks of the Tokugawa army during the war and fought the Hōjō. At the aftermath of the war, Ieyasu immediately organized a kishōmon(blood oath) ceremony with the former Takeda vassals to declare their loyalty to the Tokugawa clan, which resulted in:

- 70 former Takeda samurai from the Tsuchiya clan under the command of Ii Naomasa (another source mentioned a total of 120 Takeda samurai warriors,
- 11 former Takeda samurai from the Komai clan led by Komai Masanao under the command of Sakakibara Yasumasa,
- 60 former Takeda samurai from the Asari clan led by Asari Masatane under the command of Honda Tadakatsu,
- huge portions of Takeda vassals under the direct control of Ieyasu himself, including clans led by Yoda Nobushige. Among those who were assigned as Hatamoto, or direct vassal of Ieyasu, they were allowed to retain their positions, and even increased the revenue of domains they controlled, particularly from the new territories that the Tokugawa clan conquered. Saegusa Masayoshi, the son of the Saegusa clan leader, was allowed to retain his territory, while his father, Saegusa Torayoshi, was made one of four magistrates in the Tokugawa clan.

Historian Masaru Hirayama argued that the Tenshō-Jingo war, with the resulting absorption of Takeda followers, was not only a factional conflict in the eastern provinces, but a war that determined the future unification of Japan, as it pushed Tokugawa Ieyasu into a key position of the Toyotomi government.

The second instance of the further incorporation of Takeda vassals occurred on November 13, 1585, when Ishikawa Kazumasa defected from Ieyasu to Hideyoshi. This caused Ieyasu to undertake major reforms of the structures of the Tokugawa government and take the bureaucratic administration and military doctrines practiced by Shingen as the core for his statecraft. At first, Ieyasu ordered Torii Mototada, who served as the county magistrate of Kai, to collect military laws, weapons, and military equipment from the time of Shingen and bring them to Hamamatsu Castle. Later, he also appointed two former Takeda vassals, Naruse Masakazu and Okabe Masatsuna, as magistrates under the authority of Ii Naomasa and Honda Tadakatsu. He also ordered all former Takeda vassals in his service to impart any military doctrines and structures they knew during their service under the Takeda clan. Lastly, he ordered three of his prime generals, the so-called "Tokugawa Four Heavenly Kings," Ii Naomasa, Honda Tadakatsu, and Sakakibara Yasumasa, to serve as supreme commanders of these new military regiments.

This statecraft doctrine which Ieyasu practiced and learned from Shingen's former vassals greatly benefited him in the long run, such as when Ieyasu moved his power base to the Kantō region in 1590, as he established new offices such as the Hachiōji sen'nin-dōshin, which formed from patchwork memberships from nine small clans of Takeda retainers. This group continued to serve the Tokugawa clan faithfully as the defender of Kai province during this period in service of Ieyasu. The Hachiōji sen'nin-dōshin served the Tokugawa clan even after Ieyasu's death, until their disbandment during the Meiji Restoration in 1868. (Note: At first, their members were 250 men. They further expanded to 500 after Ieyasu transferred into the Kantō region. They were later appointed as guardians of Hachiōji Castle, and their membership expanded from 500 to 1,000, thus why they were called "Hachiōji sen'nin-dōshin" (Hachiōji's 1,000 officers).)

Historian Michifumi Isoda opined that one factor why the Tokugawa clan could conquer Japan was the incorporation of former Takeda vassals into the service of Ieyasu's military regime, particularly under the command of his general Ii Naomasa. While professor Watanabe Daimon also similarly stated that the Kai Province samurai greatly influenced Ieyasu's domination of Japan. According to an anecdote from "Meisho Genkoroku" (Collection of words and deeds of great commanders in Japanese history), when Oda Nobunaga sent Takeda Katsuyori's head to Ieyasu, Ieyasu remarked in front of the former Takeda followers that although Katsuyori was a biological son of Shingen, Ieyasu was the "spiritual successor" of Shingen.

=== Retainers ===
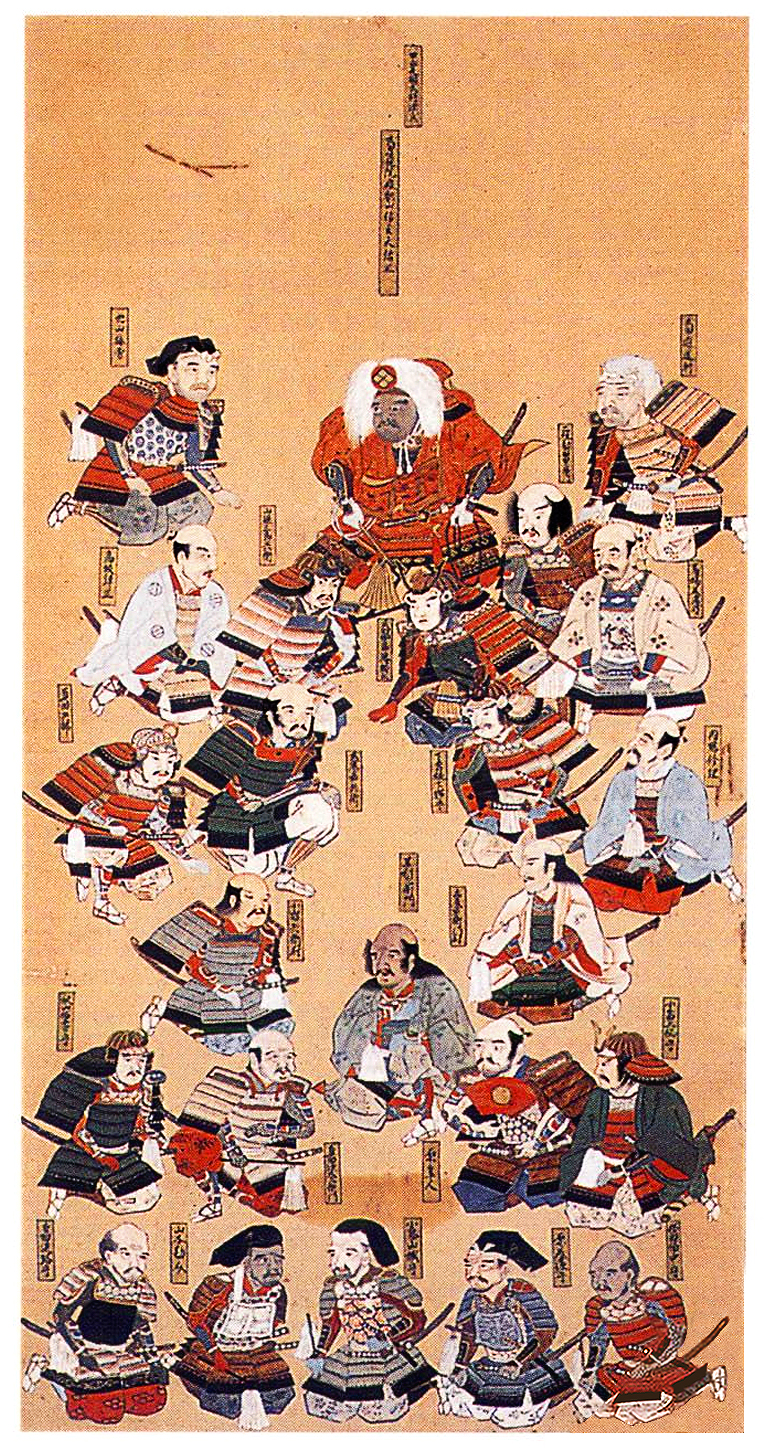
Takeda Shingen's 24 generals

During the Edo period, the 24 retainers who served under Shingen were a popular topic for ukiyo-e and bunraku. The names vary from work to work and the following list is the widely agreed version of retainers. They had not all worked together, as some had died before others served, but they were noted for their exceptional contributions to Shingen and the Takeda clan.

Of his retainers, Kōsaka Masanobu stands out as one of Shingen's better known beloveds, in the style of the Japanese shudō tradition. The two entered into the relationship when Shingen was 22 and Masanobu was 16. The love pact signed by the two, in Tokyo University's historical archive, documents Shingen's pledge that he was not involved in, nor had any intentions of entering into, a sexual relationship with a certain other retainer, and asserts that "since I want to be intimate with you" he will in no way harm the boy, and calls upon the gods to be his guarantors.

Twenty-Four Generals of Takeda Shingen

- Akiyama Nobutomo
- Amari Torayasu
- Anayama Nobutada
- Baba Nobuharu
- Hara Masatane
- Hara Toratane
- Ichijō Nobutatsu, younger brother of Shingen
- Itagaki Nobukata
- Kiso Yoshimasa
- Kōsaka Masanobu
- Naitō Masatoyo
- Obata Masamori
- Obata Toramori
- Obu Toramasa
- Oyamada Nobushige
- Saegusa Moritomo
- Sanada Nobutsuna
- Sanada Yukitaka
- Tada Mitsuyori
- Tsuchiya Masatsugu
- Takeda Nobukado
- Takeda Nobushige
- Yamagata Masakage
- Yamamoto Kansuke
- Yokota Takatoshi

Other Generals

- Hoshina Masatoshi
- Morozumi Torasada
- Ohama Kagetaka
- Sanada Masayuki

=== Modern culture ===
- Generations of farming peasants who become warriors to fight Shingen's battles are depicted in the 1960 movie The River Fuefuki, aka Fuefukigawa by director Keisuke Kinoshita. The film is based on a novel by Shichirō Fukazawa.
- Shingen's life is depicted in the 1969 film Samurai Banners, seen through the eyes of his general Yamamoto Kansuke. The film is based on a novel by Inoue Yasushi titled Furin Kazan.
- Shingen's life is also dramatized in NHK's 46th Taiga drama Fūrin Kazan, which depicts the life of his strategist, Yamamoto Kansuke.
- Shingen's battles with Uesugi Kenshin were dramatized in the movie Heaven and Earth.
- Shingen's death is fictionalized in Akira Kurosawa's film Kagemusha.
- He is mentioned on episode 31 of the Tokusatsu 1988 series Sekai Ninja Sen Jiraiya. The focus of this episode is Shingen's alleged missing famous sword Nobutora, and its discovery in France.
- His life is the subject of a historical novel by Jirō Nitta, which was adapted for television in the 1988 NHK Taiga drama Takeda Shingen, starring Kiichi Nakai, distributed internationally under the title Shingen.
- Shingen the Ruler (Takeda Shingen 2 in Japan) is a turn-based strategy game for the Nintendo Entertainment System (NES), produced by Hot B in 1989, and released in North America in 1990.
- The Takeda Clan is a faction in Creative Assembly's Shogun: Total War and Total War: Shogun 2 with Shingen himself appearing in the latter's opening cinematic.
- The 2020 video game Ghost of Tsushima includes a bonus armour set ("Gosaku's Armor") that is heavily inspired by Shingen's actual famous armour set.
- Shingen has appeared in the Samurai Warriors and Sengoku Basara video game franchises, and in the anime Sengoku Basara: Samurai Kings. He is a character in all of the games of the Warriors Orochi series. He is a playable character in Pokémon Conquest (Pokémon + Nobunaga's Ambition in Japan), with his partner Pokémon being Rhyperior and Groudon.
- In Samurai Champloo, the character Jin has the Takeda mon on his keikogi.
- Video game music composer Ryu Umemoto (1974–2011) was a descendant of Takeda.
- Shingen was mentioned in episode 10 of The Tatami Galaxy when the protagonist noted that a 4.5 tatami room is perfect, and if a room were to be larger than that, it would end up being "as spacious as Takeda Shingen's lavatory, and one might even get lost".
- He is a main character in the anime Sengoku Basara: Samurai Kings and Sengoku Basara: The Last Party. He is shown with a superhuman strength, able to use a large ax with effortless precision, ride two horses in standing position, even riding up walls vertically.
- In Battle Girls: Time Paradox, he appeared as a hotheaded woman who committed nothing to obtain the power of the red armor.
- In the light novel The Ambition of Oda Nobuna, Shingen is portrayed as a cunning young woman who strongly opposes other daimyo.
- Shingen is a playable character in the Mobile/PC Game Rise of Kingdoms.
- Shingen is summonable as a Rider-class Servant in Fate/Grand Order.
- Shingen is an Uber rare unit in The Battle Cats. He is seen carrying a massive axe or sword. He has the 3rd highest damage in the game. His description in game reads: "a master tactician of overwhelming power who is cursed by the legendary cat sword"

==== Shingen-ko Festival ====
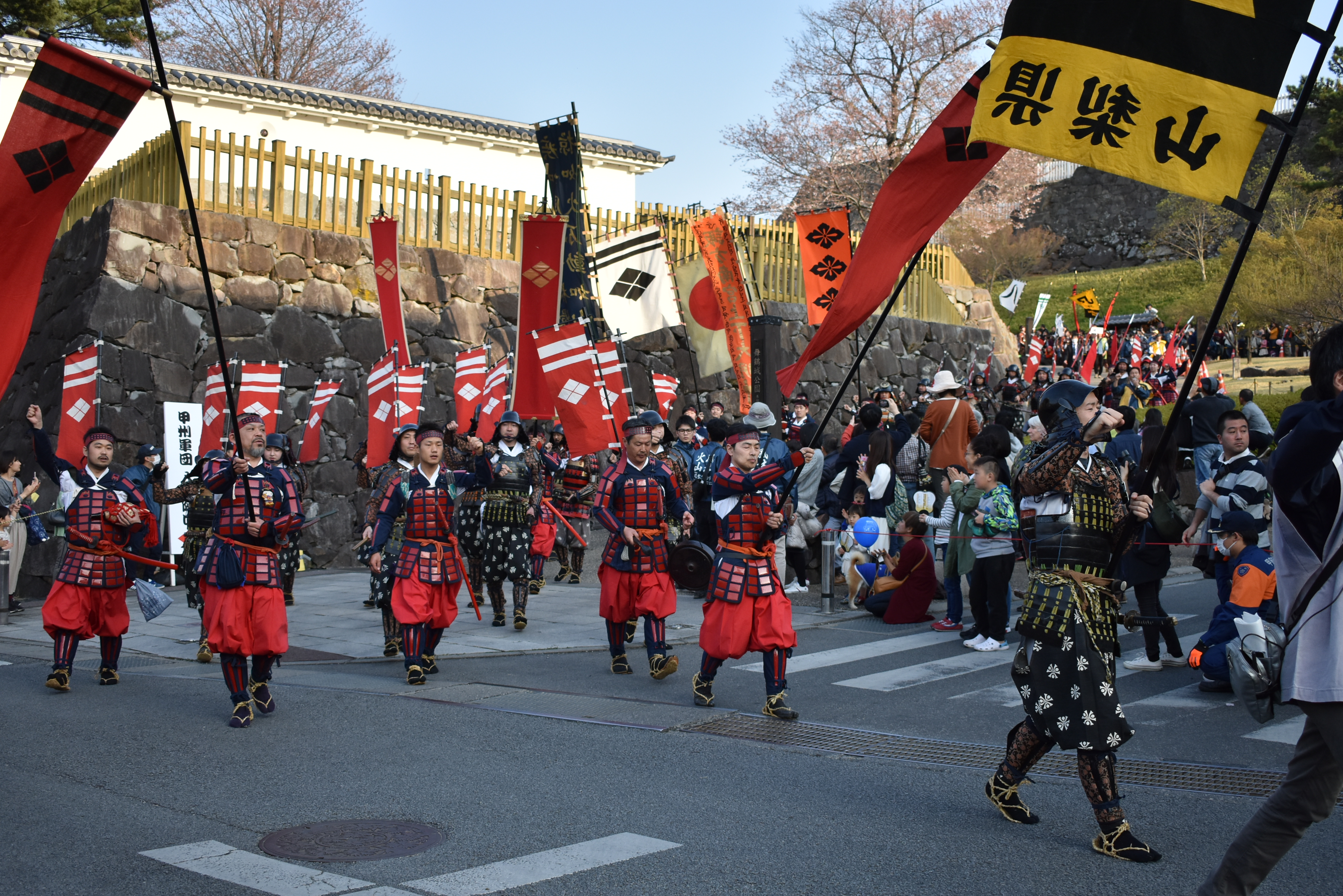
Shingen-ko Festival – The army corps in front of Maizuru Castle Park (2019)

Lasting three days, the Shingen-ko Festival (信玄公祭り, Shingen-ko Matsuri) is held annually on the first or second weekend of April in Kōfu, Yamanashi Prefecture to celebrate the legacy of Shingen. In the lunar calendar, Shingen died on the 12th day of the 4th month, and so April 12 is celebrated as the anniversary of his death (despite it being May 13 in the Gregorian calendar). Usually, a famous Japanese celebrity plays the part of Shingen. There are several parades going between the Takeda Shrine and Kofu Castle reflecting the various comings and goings of Shingen during his life.

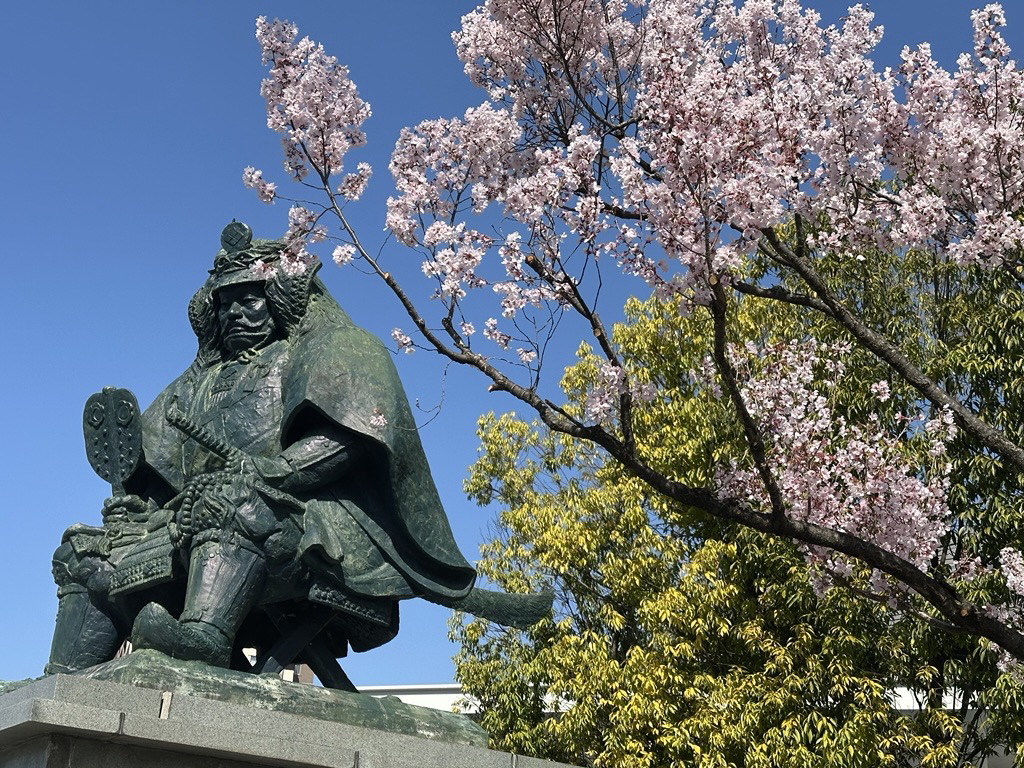
Statue of Takeda Shingen at Kōfu Station, during cherry blossom season

The parades are described as very theatrical, involving re-enactors who practice all year for this one weekend.

=== Family ===
- Father: Takeda Nobutora (1494–1574)
- Mother: Ōi no Kata
- Brothers:
  - Takematsu (1517–1523)
  - Inuchiyo (1523–1529)
  - Takeda Nobushige (1525–1561)
  - Takeda Nobumoto
  - Takeda Nobukado (1529–1582)
  - Matsuo Nobukore (c. 1530s – 1571)
  - Takeda Souchi
  - Takeda Nobuzane (c. 1530s – 1575)
  - Ichijō Nobutatsu (c. 1539 – 1582)
- Sisters:
  - Joukei-in (1519–1550), married Imagawa Yoshimoto
  - Nanshou-in (born 1520) married Anayama Nobutomo
  - Nene (1528–1543) married Suwa Yorishige
- Sons:
  - Takeda Katsuyori by Suwa Goryōnin
  - Takeda Yoshinobu by Lady Sanjō
  - Takeda Nobuchika (also known as Unno Nobuchika) by Lady Sanjō
  - Takeda Nobukiyo
  - Nishina Morinobu
  - Katsurayama Nobusada
- Daughters:
  - Ōbai-in
  - Kenshō-in
  - Shinryu-in
  - Matsuhime
  - Kikuhime

== Appendix ==
=== Bibliography ===
- Fujino, Tamotsu (1990). 徳川家康事典 [Tokugawa Ieyasu] (in Japanese). Shinbutsu Orai Company/新人人往来社. ISBN 9784404017192.
- Kazuhiro Marushima (丸島和洋) (2015). "北条・徳川間外交の意思伝達構造" [The structure of communication in diplomacy between the Hojo and Tokugawa]. 国文学研究資料館紀要. 11 (11). 国文学研究資料館. doi:10.24619/00001469. ISSN 1880-2249.
- Tanaka, Kaoru (2007). 松本藩. シリーズ藩物語. 現代書館. ISBN 978-4-7684-7108-1.
