= Takeda Nobutora =

Japanese daimyō (feudal lord)

- 武田 信虎
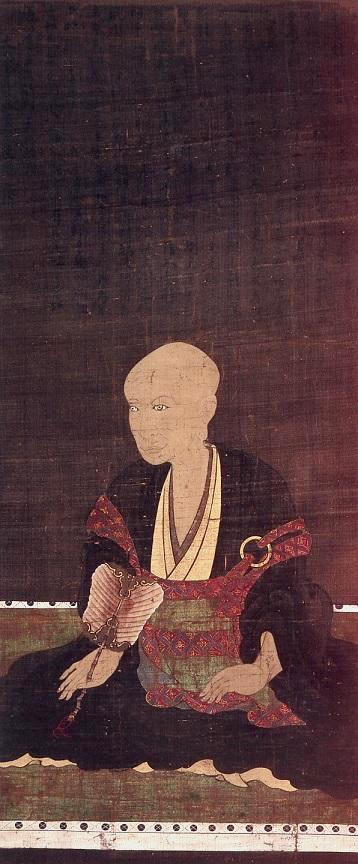

Head of Takeda clan
- In office 1507–1540
- Preceded by: Takeda Nobutsuna
- Succeeded by: Takeda Shingen

Personal details
- Born: February 11, 1494
- Died: March 27, 1574 (aged 80)
- Relations: Takeda Katsuyori (grandson)
- Children: Takeda Shingen; Takeda Nobushige; Takeda Nobukado; Takeda Nobuzane; Ichijo Nobutatsu
- Parent: Takeda Nobutsuna (father)

Military service
- Allegiance: Takeda clan
- Rank: Lord (Daimyō)
- Commands: Kōfu
- Battles/wars: Battle of Iidagawara (1521); Battle of Nashinokidaira (1526); Battle of Shiokawa no gawara (1531); Battle of Un no Kuchi (1536)

Takeda Nobutora (武田 信虎; February 11, 1494 – March 27, 1574) was a Japanese daimyō (feudal lord) who controlled the Province of Kai, and fought in a number of battles of the Sengoku period. He was the father and predecessor of the famous Takeda Shingen.

== Biography ==
Nobutora’s son was Harunobu, later known as Takeda Shingen, along with two other sons, Nobushige and Nobukado.

Nobutora defeated Imagawa Ujichika in 1521 at the Battle of Iidagawara, defeated Hōjō Ujitsuna in 1526 at the Battle of Nashinokidaira, defeated Suwa Yorishige in the 1531 at Battle of Shiokawa no gawara, and defeated Hiraga Genshin in the 1536 at Battle of Un no Kuchi with the aid of his son Harunobu. During that battle, Nobutora was forced to retreat, but his son Harunobu turned around the condition, defeated Hiraga and took the castle.

Nobutora nevertheless wished to pass on his domain to Nobushige, and so in 1540, Harunobu overthrew his father and exiled him to Suruga. Nobutora didn't return to Kai until the death of Shingen in 1573, at the invitation of his grandson Katsuyori. At that time, Nobutora was in his 80s, though some reported that even as an old man he still managed to strike fear to people around him.

Nobutora died on March 27, 1574, and was buried at the Daisenji temple in Kofu, Yamanashi.

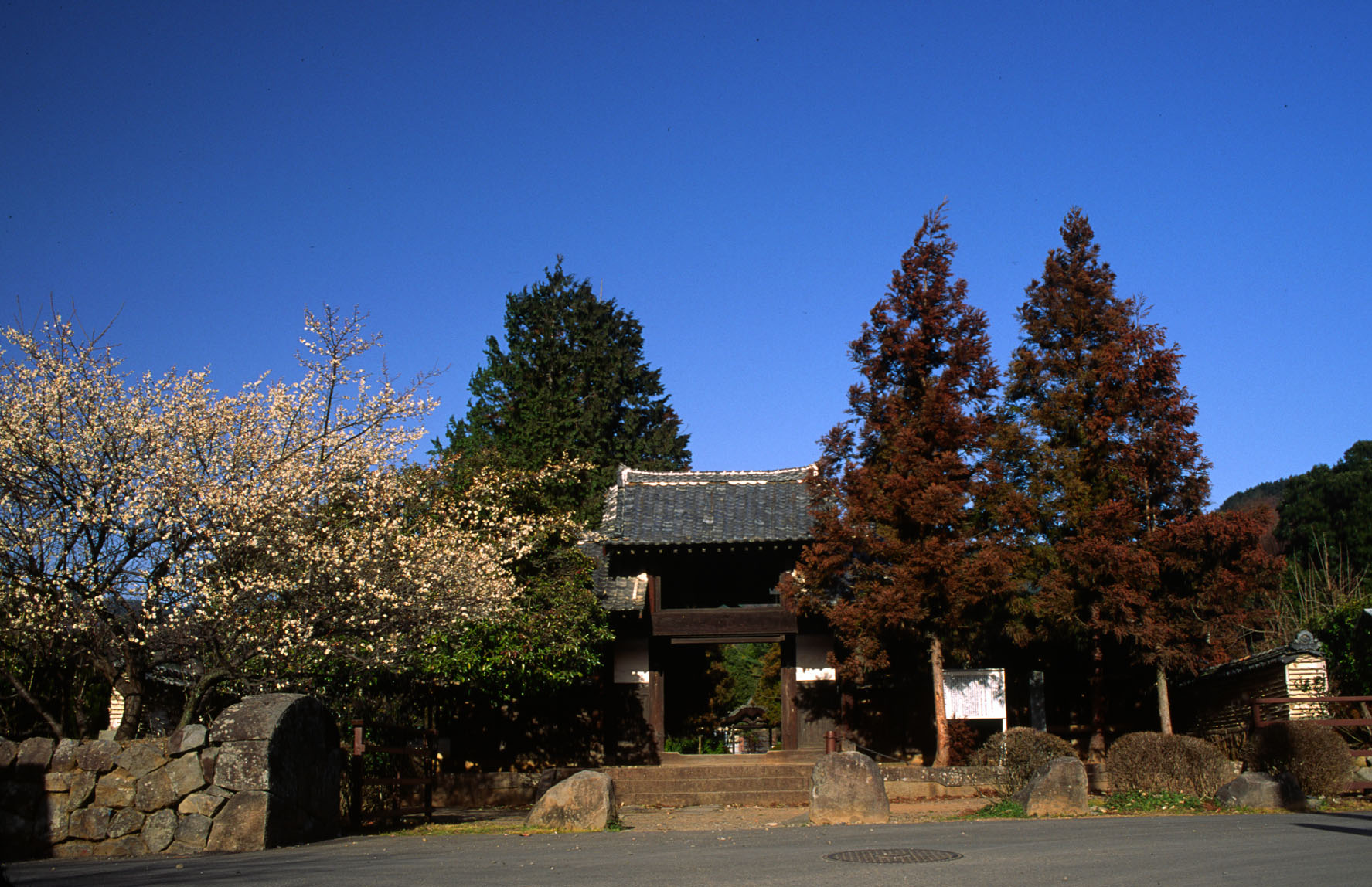
The grave of Takeda Nobutora is at Daisenji in Kofu, Yamanashi.

== Family ==
- Father: Takeda Nobutsuna (1471-1507)
- Sons:
  - Takematsu (1517-1523)
  - Takeda Shingen
  - Inuchiyo (1523-1529)
  - Takeda Nobushige
  - Takeda Nobumoto
  - Takeda Nobukado
  - Matsuo Nobukore (1530-1571)
  - Takeda Souchi
  - Takeda Nobuzane
  - Ichijo Nobutatsu
- Daughters:
  - Joukei-in (1519-1550) married Imagawa Yoshimoto
  - Nanshou-in (1520-?) married Anayama Nobutomo
  - Nene (1528-1543) married Suwa Yorishige

== Nobutora's Character ==
- According to the Kōyō Gunkan, completed in the Edo period, he was a coarse and arrogant samurai.

== Soza Samonji sword ==
Nobutora was also a previous owner of a famous Katana sword named "Soza Samonji" (宗三左文字), although he gave that sword to Imagawa Yoshimoto as a gift to secure an alliance. After Yoshimoto's death at the Okehazama, the sword came into possession of Oda Nobunaga. After the Incident of Honnoji, Toyotomi Hideyoshi recovered the sword, which he later gave to Tokugawa Ieyasu as a gift. The sword is currently a Cultural Properties of Japan.
