= Katsusuke =

- Gender: Male

Origin
- Origin: Japanese
- Meaning: Different meanings depending on the kanji used

Katsusuke (written: 勝弼, 勝資 or 勝典) is a masculine Japanese given name. Notable people with the name include:

- Atobe Katsusuke (跡部 勝資) (1529–1582), Japanese samurai
- Itakura Katsusuke (板倉 勝弼), Japanese daimyō
- Katsusuke Miyauchi (宮内 勝典) (born 1944), Japanese writer and activist
