= Battle of Nagashino =

1575 Oda-Tokugawa victory over the Takeda clan

Coordinates: 34°55′14″N 137°33′45″E

- Part of the Sengoku period
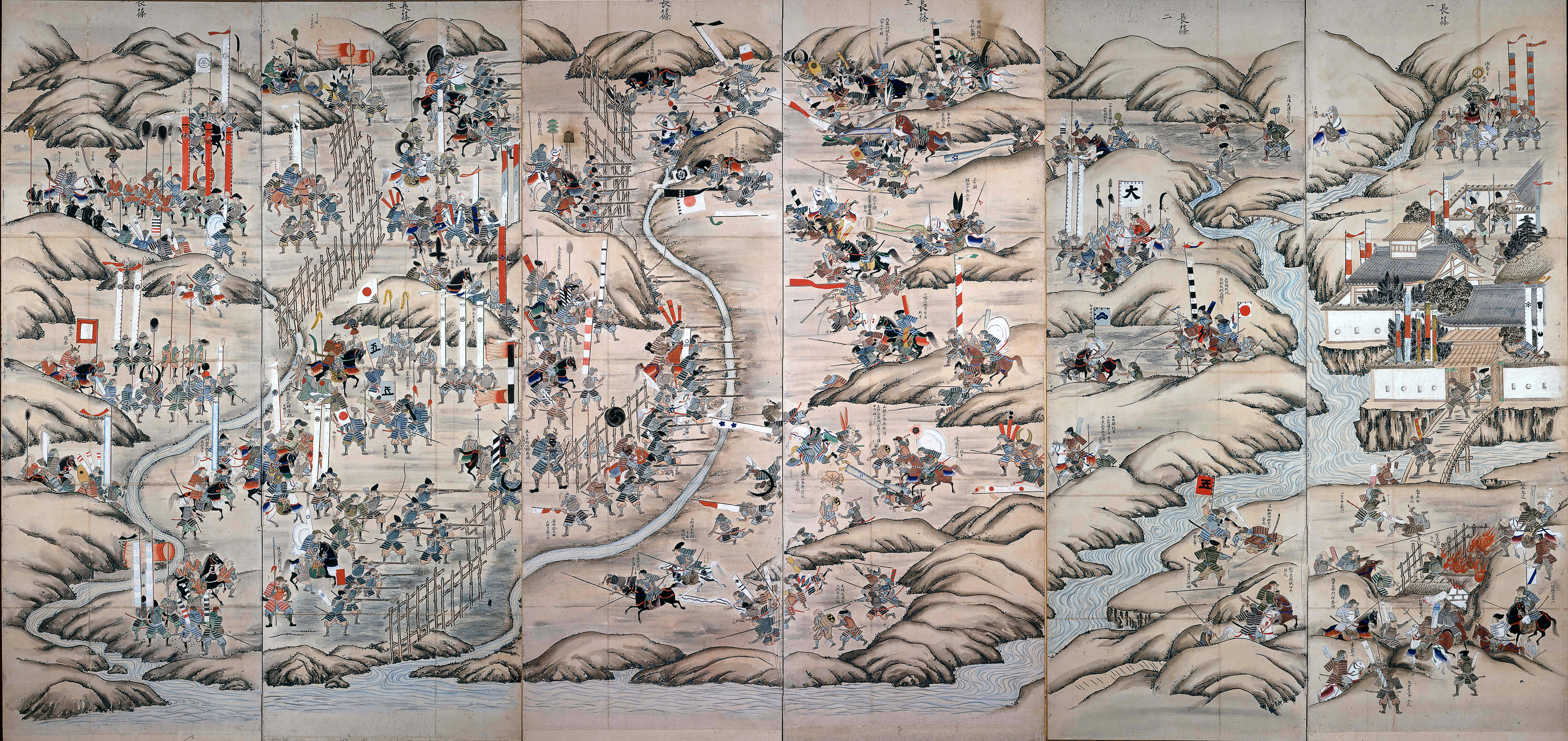
- Battle of Nagashino pictured on a Byōbu screen
| Date | 28 June 1575 |
| Location | Nagashino Castle, Mikawa, Honshu |
| Result | Oda–Tokugawa victory |

Belligerents
| Oda clan Tokugawa clan | Takeda clan |

Commanders and leaders
| Oda Nobunaga; Tokugawa Ieyasu; Imagawa Ujizane; Honda Tadakatsu; Shibata Katsuie; Oda Nobutada; Akechi Mitsuhide; Sassa Narimasa; Ikeda Tsuneoki; Okudaira Nobumasa; Hashiba Hideyoshi; Matsudaira Ietada; Niwa Nagahide; Ōkubo Tadayo; Maeda Toshiie; Sakuma Nobumori; Kanamori Nagachika; Matsudaira Nobuyasu; Ishikawa Kazumasa; Takigawa Kazumasu; Ōkubo Tadachika; Sakai Tadatsugu; Sakakibara Yasumasa; Watanabe Moritsuna; Matsudaira Koretada †; Honda Shigetsugu | Takeda Katsuyori; Takeda Nobukado; Takeda Nobuzane †; Takeda Nobutatsu; Takeda Nobutoyo; Anayama Nobutada; Oyamada Nobushige; Yamagata Masakage †; Naitō Masatoyo †; Baba Nobufusa †; Sanada Masayuki; Sanada Nobutsuna †; Sanada Masateru †; Tsuchiya Masatsugu †; Obata Masamori; Hara Masatane †; Saegusa Moritomo †; Kōsaka Masanobu |

Strength
| 38,000–72,000 | 15,000–20,000 |

Casualties and losses
| 6,000 killed | 10,000 killed |

The Battle of Nagashino (長篠の戦い, Nagashino no Tatakai) was a famous battle in Japanese history, fought in 1575 at Nagashino in Mikawa Province (present-day Nagashino, Shinshiro, Aichi Prefecture). The allied forces of Oda Nobunaga and Tokugawa Ieyasu (38,000) fought against Takeda Katsuyori's forces (15,000) and the allied forces won a crushing victory over the Takeda clan. As a result, Oda Nobunaga's unification of Japan was seen as certain.

In recent years, the battle has increasingly been referred to as the Battle of Nagashino and Shitaragahara (長篠・設楽原の戦い, Nagashino Shitaragahara no Tatakai). The battle started with an offensive over Nagashino Castle, followed by a battle at Shitaragahara, about 4 km to the west of the castle. Traditionally, the siege of Nagashino Castle by the Takeda forces and the decisive battle between the two main armies were regarded as a series of manoeuvres, and the battle was called the "Battle of Nagashino" after Nagashino, the name of a wide area in the region. However, if the emphasis is on the actual location of the battle (where the final battle took place), it is more appropriate to use "Battle of Shitara-gahara". Therefore, both place names are now listed together.

The battle is often cited as a turning point in Japanese warfare and as the first "modern" battle in Japan, as it was the battle in which Oda Nobunaga defeated the cavalry of the Takeda army with his powerful arquebusiers, using tanegashima.

The causes of victory for the allied forces used to be cited as the horse defensive fence (stockade) that prevented the advance of the Takeda cavalry, the three-stage shooting of 3,000 guns that fired in rapid succession in shifts of 1,000 guns each, and Katsuyori's reckless orders for a charge. However, recent research has led to the theory that the real cause of victory was something else. (Note: It is also said that the Oda Army's matchlock guns unit did not play a leading role on the Nagashino battlefield in the first place.) However, there is no doubt that matchlock guns played an active role, including in the sniping death of Yamagata Masakage, who was a famous general in the Takeda Army.

== Background ==
The trigger for the battle was the offensive between Tokugawa Ieyasu and Takeda Katsuyori over the North Mikawa region. The Takeda and Tokugawa clans had been at war with each other since the lifetime of Takeda Shingen. Nevertheless, the Takeda forces were overwhelmingly superior in terms of strength, and the Okudaira clan and other Okumikawa provincial leaders in the north-eastern part of the Mikawa region sought to prolong their lives by joining the Takeda side. On the other hand, Tokugawa Ieyasu had a powerful ally in Oda Nobunaga, but Nobunaga, who held the capital and was rapidly increasing his power, was by no means an equal ally. Ieyasu's position was that of a subcontractor who could not complain, although he called himself a cooperative company, and was used by Nobunaga as a good bulwark against the powerful Takeda forces. Takeda's forces had overrun Tokugawa territory on numerous occasions, but when Shingen fell ill during a campaign in Mikawa in May 1573, Takeda's forces retreated to Kai Province and worked to transfer power to Katsuyori while concealing Shingen's death. Ieyasu, sensing something unusual in the movements of the Takeda forces, shrewdly set out to rewind the situation. He maneuvered the kunishū (powerful families) of Okumikawa to regain the Northern Mikawa area from the Takeda clan.

Tokugawa forces sent Honda Tadakatsu and Sakakibara Yasumasa to capture the Nagashino Castle. Both of them managed to defeat the Takeda clan armies which guarded the castle and completed their mission to capture it. By recapturing Nagashino Castle, Ieyasu gained a strategic transport point, and made it his base in the region. In response, Takeda Katsuyori, who had finished his succession of power, led the main force of the Takeda army into the Okumikawa region. He then moved south along the Toyokawa River and ravaged the entire East Mikawa region, launching raids throughout the Tokugawa vassals' estates. Aside from that, Tadakatsu also captured many other castles in Tōtōmi Province from the Takeda clan.

In 1575, during the conflict between the Oda-Tokugawa alliance against Takeda Katsuyori, when the latter invaded Enshū province, Tadakatsu and Sakakibara fought under the Tokugawa forces against Katsuyori, where they captured the Komyo castle in June.

== Battle ==
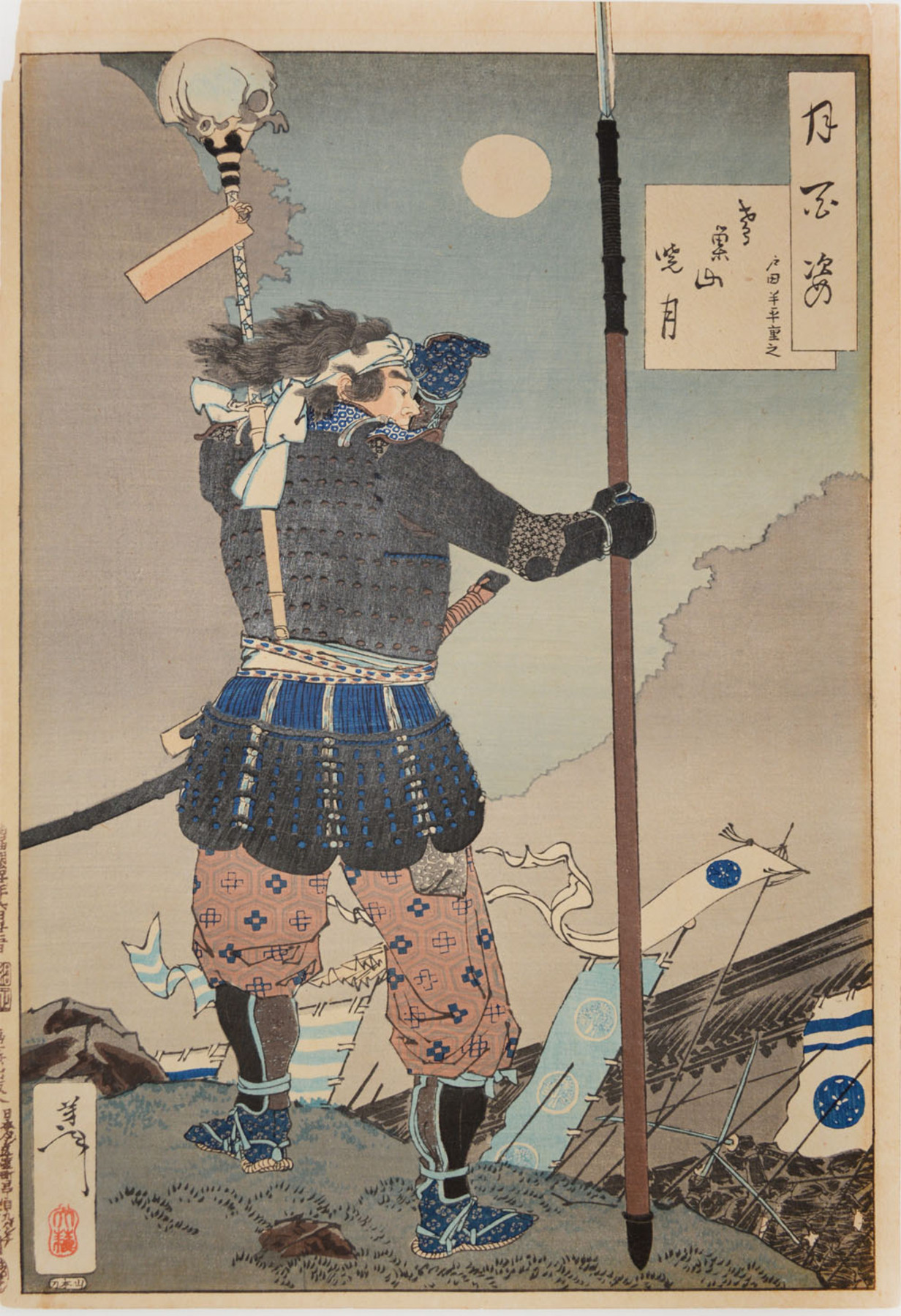
Depiction of Sakai Tadatsugu with skull head as standard on his back, at the attack of Nagashino, 1575, work by Tsukioka Yoshitoshi.

=== Siege of Nagashino Castle ===
In June 1575, Takeda Katsuyori invaded Mikawa Province. Katsuyori surrounded Nagashino Castle, which had only 500 defenders, with a large army of 15,000 men and launched an onslaught to make it a bridgehead for the Mikawa invasion. Tokugawa Ieyasu, in a difficult situation, decided that the Tokugawa army, which could mobilise only about 8,000 troops, could not stand against the Takeda army alone, and requested support from his ally Oda Nobunaga. At the time, Nobunaga had been engaged in battles with the Hongan-ji and Miyoshi clan for several years and was not normally in a position to go to Mikawa. However, he had just rested his soldiers after the battle had been brought to a halt when he attacked a castle built by the Hongan-ji and the Miyoshi clan offered to surrender. Nobunaga decided to throw the main Oda forces into Nagashino at once and left Gifu on 21 June. He led an Oda force of about 30,000 troops to Mikawa with his heir, Oda Nobutada, and joined Ieyasu at Okazaki on 22 June. Arriving at Shitaragahara on 26 June, he halted his march without going to the relief of Nagashino Castle and set up camp there. Nobunaga set up his main camp on Mount Gokurakuji, west of Shitaragahara, while Nobutada set up his camp on Mount Shinmido. Nobunaga set up camp on Shitaragahara because it was a depression. Taking advantage of the terrain, he positioned his 30,000-strong army so that it did not look like a large force from the Takeda side. Ieyasu set up camp on Mount Takamatsu in the front facing the Rengo River.

According to the Shinchō Kōki, (Note: A kind of memoir compiled by Gyuichi Ota, a vassal of Nobunaga, based on his own notes that he had written down. It is known as a basic source for Nobunaga research because of the high authenticity of the descriptions.) the Oda-Tokugawa allied forces steadily built positions with horse defence fences and earthworks in preparation for the onslaught of the Takeda forces.

Meanwhile, at Nagashino Castle, which was on the verge of falling under the onslaught of the Takeda forces, Torii Suneemon was sent as a messenger to Ieyasu in Okazaki to ask for reinforcements. Informed that Ieyasu was marching on Nagashino with the Oda forces, Torii returned to the castle to deliver the good news. However, he was captured by the Takeda forces. He was persuaded that his life would be spared and his reward would be as he wished if he shouted to the castle that 'reinforcements would not come', but Torii shouted to the castle that 'reinforcements would definitely come' and was crucified.

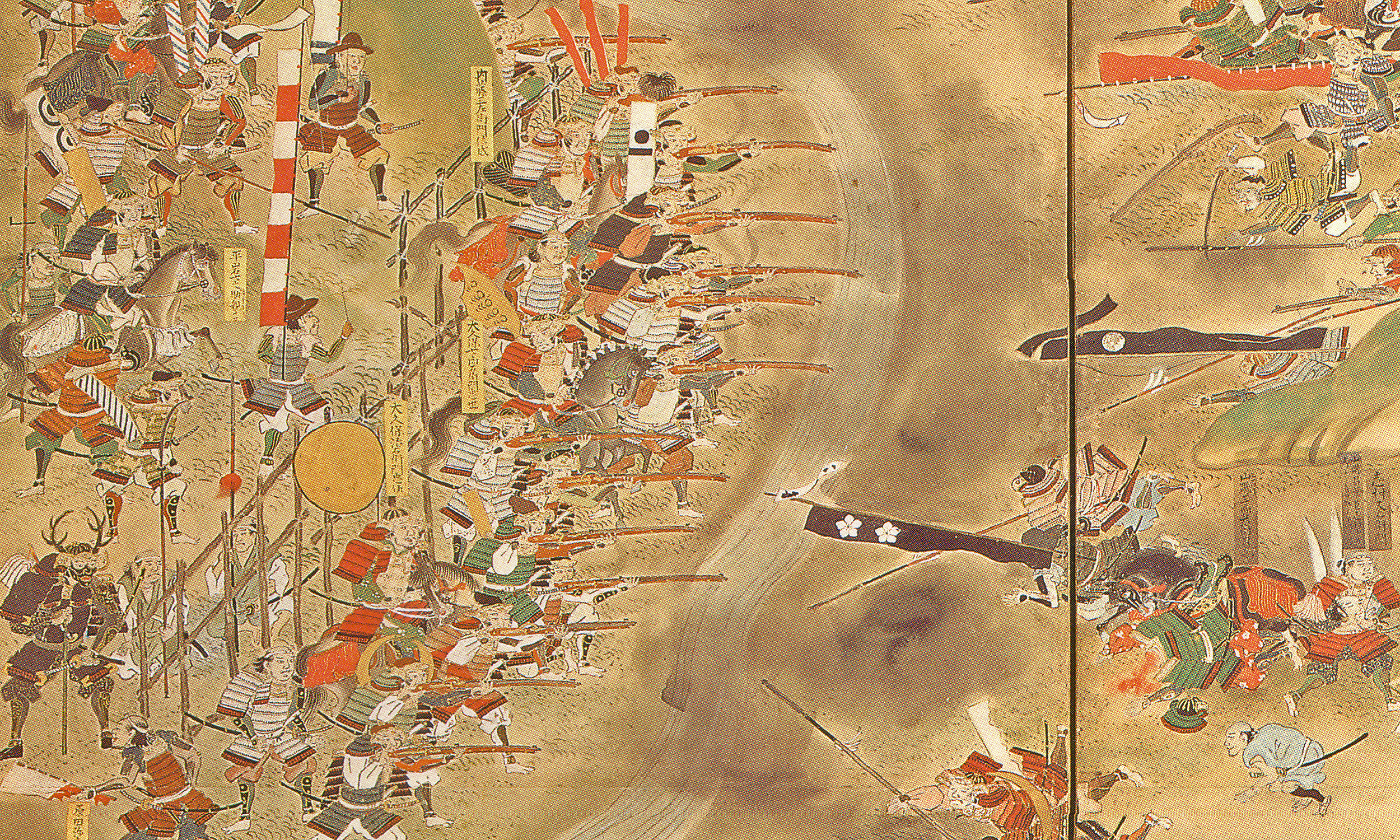
Folding screen depicting the battle in Nagashino, with Honda Tadakatsu on the far bottom-left. The headless corpse of a Takeda warrior on the far right is Masakage Yamagata.

When Takeda's vassals learnt of the arrival of Oda's army, they advised Katsuyori to retreat to Kai, but he decided to go ahead with the decisive battle. Katsuyori had received information of Nobunaga's departure, but was unable to gauge the strength of Oda's forces or Nobunaga's true intentions. However, when he saw that Nobunaga and Ieyasu's forces did not immediately come to the relief of Nagashino Castle and began to fortify the defence, he underestimated the number of allied forces as Nobunaga had planned and judged that the enemy was weak. And he seemed to have decided that Nobunaga would not seriously help Ieyasu as he had done before, so he could strike the enemy forces down before their fighting spirit increased and he decided to go ahead with the decisive battle.

=== Main Battle of Nagashino ===
On 28 June, Takeda Katsuyori marched to the east of Shitaragahara with his main force of 12,000, leaving 3,000 men to maintain the siege around Nagashino Castle. Seeing this, Oda Nobunaga also advanced the Oda-Tokugawa forces, and the two sides faced each other across the Rengo River. Nobunaga moved his headquarters from Gokuraku-ji to Ishiza-yama (Chausu-yama) and took command. Nobunaga adopted a suggestion from Sakai Tadatsugu, a Tokugawa vassal, and ordered a surprise attack on Mount Tobigasu. Sakai set out in the middle of the night with a flying column of about 4,000 men. On the early morning of 29 June, Tadatsugu launched an attack against the Takeda forces defending the fort from behind Mount Tobigasu. As Takeda's soldiers in the fort were defeated, the detachment entered the castle in cooperation with the soldiers of Nagashino Castle, driving off the Takeda forces. This left Takeda's main army with its retreat cut off and the enemy behind it, and it had no choice but to charge at the Oda-Tokugawa force. With nowhere to go, the Takeda army began to attack the Tokugawa and Oda camps in front of it, one after the other.

After receiving the report about the battle's development, Nobunaga personally came to Mount Takamatsu, Ieyasu's main camp, to inspect the war situation and took command of the entire army there. He then deployed a matchlock corps led by five bugyō to the front line. Takeda's forces repeatedly charged, but each time they were blocked by matchlock guns and horse defense fences, and retreated. By midday, victory and defeat became increasingly clear and the Takeda forces began their rout. According to Shinchō Kōki, the battle began early in the morning and lasted until around 2 pm. With many of their troops killed, Takeda's army began to retreat, but Nobunaga pounced on them when their ranks gave way, inflicting even more casualties.

== Aftermath ==
The battle ended in an overwhelming victory for the allied forces, with the Takeda side losing a number of well-known commanders.According to Shinchō Kōki, Takeda suffered a loss of 10,000 men, two-thirds of his original besieging force. Several of the Twenty-Four Generals of Takeda Shingen were killed in this battle, including Baba Nobuharu, Hara Masatane, Sanada Nobutsuna with his younger brother Sanada Masateru, Yamagata Masakage, Saegusa Moritomo, Tsuchiya Masatsugu, Naitō Masatoyo, and Obata Masamori.This defeat was too painful for Takeda Katsuyori. He could no longer afford to conquer other territories and was forced to retreat back to his stronghold of Kai. Smaller scale offensive still mounted by the Takeda and in 1577, a Takeda clan general Miura Uemonnosuke tried to attack Hōkizuka Castle. However, he was failed to capture the castle from a Tokugawa general Abe Motozane.

Meanwhile, Tokugawa Ieyasu hurried to recover lost territory. In early July, immediately after the victory, he led his army to recapture one castle after another that had been captured by the Takeda forces by then.

Nevertheless, Katsuyori was a stubborn competitor and continued to torment Ieyasu by regrouping and regrouping while retreating. In the end, the Takeda clan was not destroyed until 1582, seven years after the defeat at Nagashino and Shitaragahara.

== Analysis ==
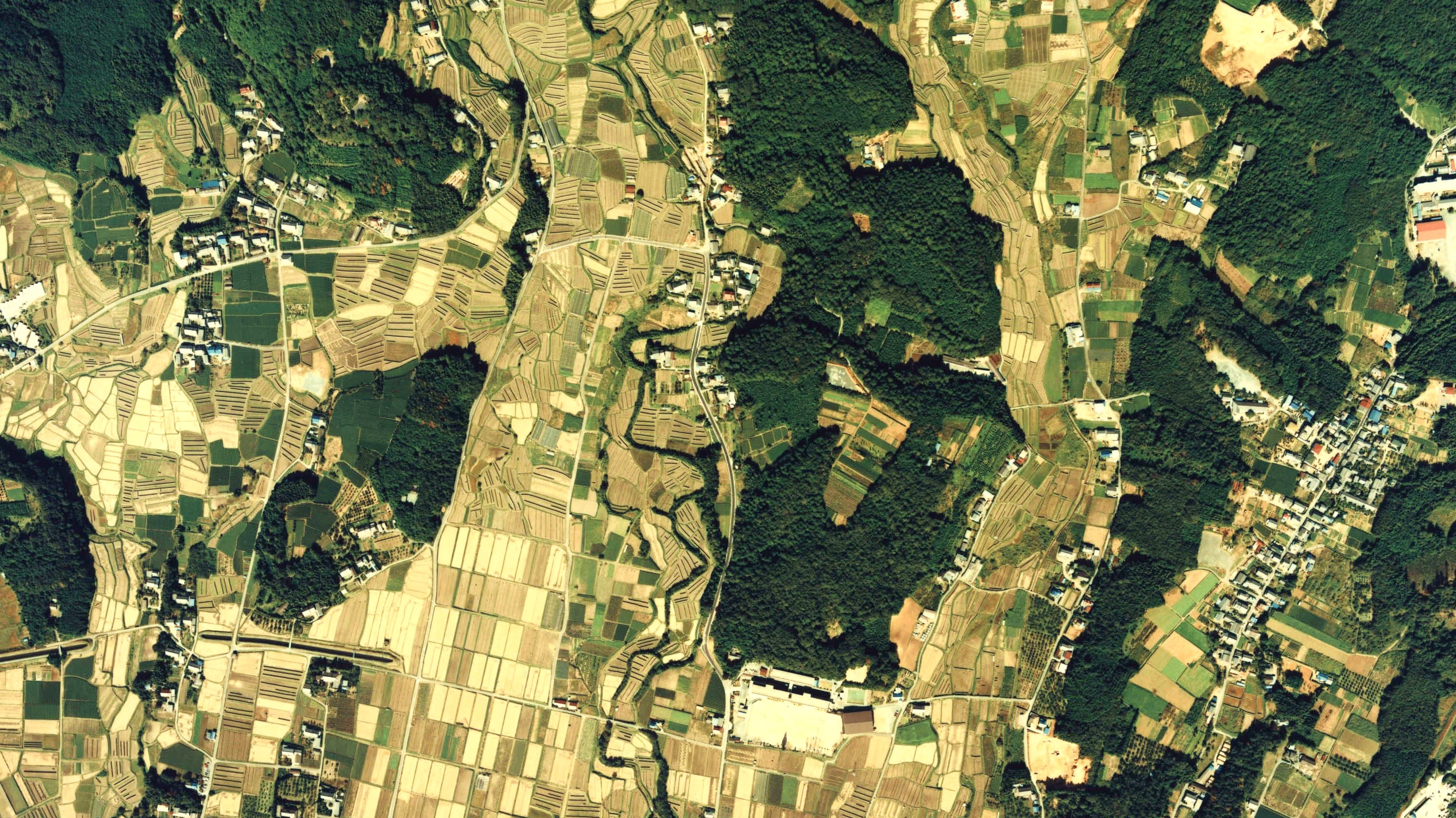
Battle of Nagashino historic battleground Aerial Photograph (taken in 1983)

The Battle of Nagashino is remembered as the battle in which Takeda Katsuyori recklessly drove his cavalry into the long horse defense fences where Oda Nobunaga was waiting with his new weapon of 3,000 matchlock guns, losing many officers and men in the process. Moreover, a myth was created that Nobunaga was a military genius who devised a new battle strategy called "three-stage shooting", in which the shooters took turns one after the other. The three-stage shooting refers to the tactic of organising matchlock guns units into three lines, each line firing constantly in rotation. It has been claimed that Nobunaga invented this tactic to compensate for the shortcomings of matchlock guns, which takes time to reload, and enabled uninterrupted, continuous firing. Specifically, the matchlock corps, divided into three stages, fire at the front line, then fall back to the rear, clean the barrels, load bullets and then move back up to the front line to fire again. The original source for this theory was Nihon Senshi Nagashino no Eki (Japanese Military History: Battle of Nagashino, 1903), compiled by the Imperial Japanese Army General Staff Office based on the war tales Shinchōki (Note: A biography of Nobunaga, written on the basis of Shinchō Kōki, but with many creative elements, the book is said to be similar to a historical novel in the modern sense of the word, and lacks authenticity.) written by Oze Hoan, a Confucian scholar of the Edo period. According to Shinchōki, Nobunaga divided the 3,000 matchlock guns into 1,000 each and instructed them to fire one stage at a time, switching from one to the other. After that book, most of the war epics that devoted a lot of paper to the Battle of Nagashino incorporated the three-stage shooting, and the content of those Edo period books was carried over into Nihon Senshi Nagashino no Eki.

Journalist Tokutomi Sohō's Kinsei Nihon Kokuminshi (National History of Japan in Early modern period, 1918–1952) follows the account in Nihon Senshi Nagashino no Eki completely. Sohō praises the 'horse defense fence' and 'three-stage shooting' and states that the Shingen style of warfare is regrettable because it is outdated compared to Nobunaga's innovative tactics. The assessment of the historical community at the time was similar, and this view was held long after the World War II. As a result, this became the prevailing view, and such scenes have been repeatedly depicted in films, TV dramas and other fictions.

However, basic problems were pointed out early on with this common theory. Subsequently, doubts were raised and research was reviewed, resulting in the prevailing opinion that the three-stage shooting by the Oda-Tokugawa allied forces with 3,000 matchlock guns was a later invention. The three-stage shooting was first questioned by amateur historical researcher Fujimoto Masayuki in his 1980 essay Nagashino no Teppō Senjutsu wa Kyokō da (Nagashino's gun tactics are fiction). Using his rich knowledge of war and military history, and emphasising the complete absence of any mention of three-stage shooting in the highly reliable Shinchō Kōki, he continued to thoroughly criticise three-stage shooting as a fiction. According to Shinchō Kōki, Nobunaga deployed about 1,000 matchlock guns between five commanders – Sassa Narimasa, Maeda Toshiie, Nonomura Masanari, Fukuzumi Hidekatsu and Ban Naomasa – and had the ashigaru press the enemy close. Regarding the number of matchlock guns, the original entry in the Shinchō Kōki states 1,000 guns. However, some manuscripts have been rewritten as 3,000 guns, although it is unclear whether this was done by Oda himself or others. During the attack on the Mount Tobigasu fort, Nobunaga sent 500 guns with Sakai Tadatsugu's detachment, so it seems that there were at least 1,500 guns in total. Of course, other units would have had guns, so in reality more than 1,500 would have been brought to Nagashino. However, there was no mention of three-stage shooting by the Oda side. In Mikawa Monogatari, written by Ōkubo Tadataka, a vassal of Ieyasu, even the number of guns is not mentioned. It is also known from military registers and other sources that Takeda's army also held approximately 1,000–1,500 guns, so there was no difference between the two armies in terms of the number of guns they had.

In the 2010s, research on the Battle of Nagashino progressed dramatically with the publication of numerous new case findings and new interpretations. This has overturned the common belief that Oda Nobunaga overwhelmed the Takeda forces with his new battle strategy, and Takeda Katsuyori, who is said to have suffered a heavy defeat due to a reckless charge by his cavalry, is being re-evaluated.

The cause of the defeat of the Takeda forces in the battle can perhaps be found in the Oda-Tokugawa allied forces's overwhelming superiority in terms of firepower and troop strength, Nobunaga's clever placement of his forces, and the fact that the Takeda misjudged their opponents' strength and attacked them head on. Nobunaga led a large army of 30,000, twice the size of the Takeda forces, but he caught Katsuyori off guard by stopping his advance in front of Nagashino Castle when he was supposed to be on his way to rescue it, and by placing his main camp in a hollow which made it difficult to see from the Takeda side making it look like he had fewer troops. Katsuyori therefore underestimated the enemy and watched from the sidelines as the allied forces steadily built up their positions. Nobunaga then organised a detachment to occupy Nagashino Castle behind the Takeda forces, forcing the main Takeda army, fearing a pincer attack, to charge into the robust positions of the Oda-Tokugawa allied forces, protected by matchlock guns and horse defence fences. However, Katsuyori's strategy was not necessarily reckless, as it was often seen in battles of the time to charge at the enemy lines. In fact, the battle was not settled until afternoon, and most of the Takeda warlords' deaths occurred during the retreat, not during the fighting.

It was also found that the expression "Takeda cavalry" was inappropriate, and that the Takeda forces did not disregard matchlock guns, but were rather less keen to introduce them in large numbers.

Traditionally, the rivalry between Oda's matchlock guns unit and Takeda's cavalry has been emphasised, but there was no clear qualitative difference between the Oda/Tokugawa and Takeda armies, and both had a commonplace Sengoku daimyō military unit structure. During this period, the vassals of the Sengoku daimyō assembled a number of soldiers, such as cavalry, spears, and bows, according to their territory and assets, and these types of soldiers acted in groups on the battlefield. This was also true of the Takeda forces, which had no units formed entirely of men on horseback and could be called cavalry units. Katsuyori also prepared a large number of matchlock guns, and Takeda's military service registration and descriptions in Shinchō Kōki reveal that the percentage of matchlock guns equipped was not much different between the allied forces and Takeda forces.

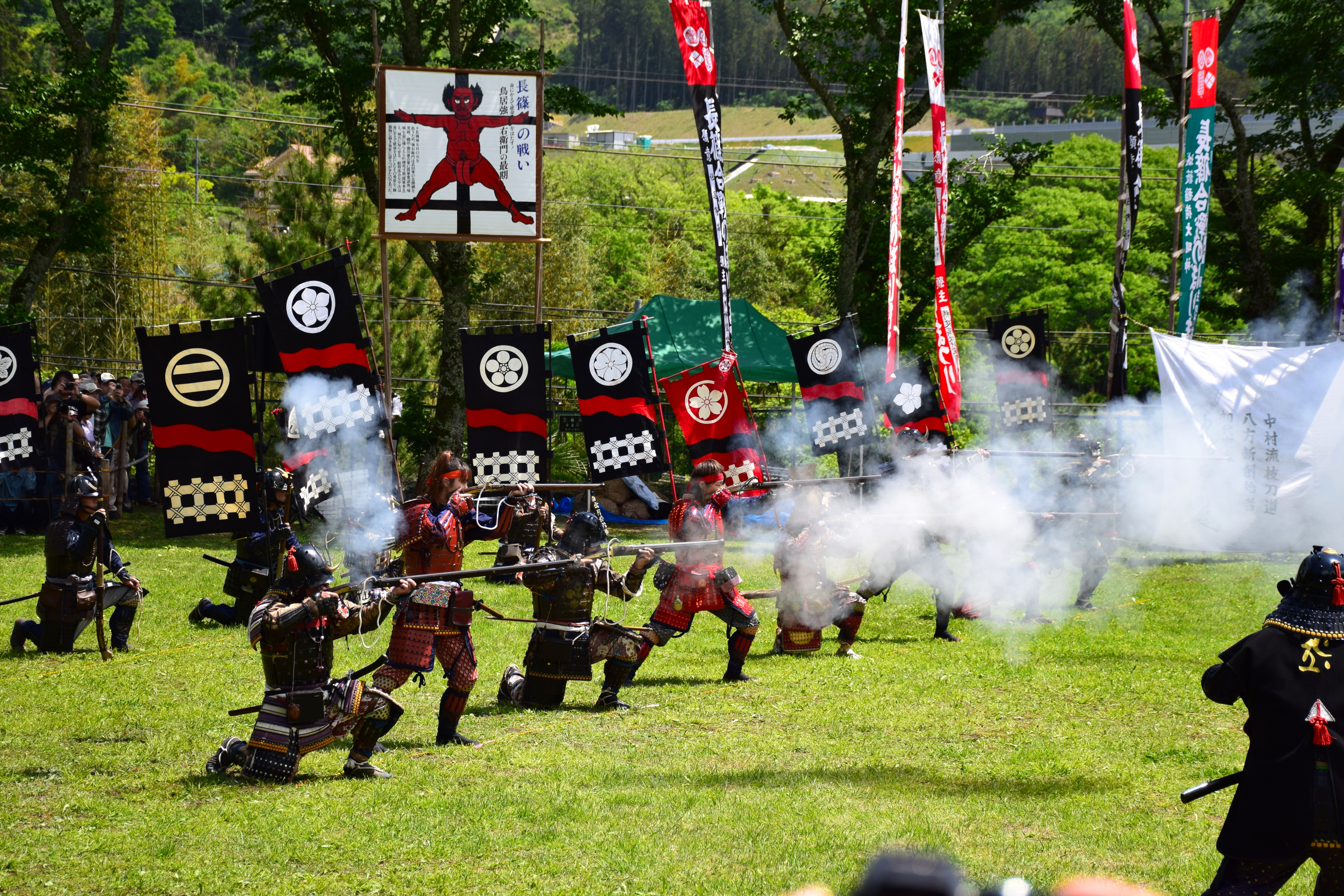
Nagashino battle's modern reenactment festival, with the picture of Torii Kyōemon Katsutaga Crucified Upside Down on the sign behind the rifle squad is upside down.

The Takeda clan had promoted the equipping of matchlock guns since the time of Shingen. (Note: The Takeda clan deployed a 300-man force of guns in the Second Battle of Kawanakajima in 1555.) but had difficulty in securing large quantities of guns and obtaining nitrates, the main raw material of gunpowder, and lead, the raw material of ball shot. On the other hand, Nobunaga, who took Sakai under his control, which had the largest trading port in Japan and was a hub for overseas trade, and who controlled distribution in Kyoto and the Kinai region, was able to easily obtain domestically produced guns and to purchase raw materials for shot and powder in large quantities from overseas in a stable manner through the Namban trade. (Note: Moreover, apparently Oda Nobunaga had imposed an economic blockade on his enemies, such as the Takeda and Hōjō clans.) This was evident from the results of scientific analysis of shot found at the Nagashino battlefield site. The lead in the shot of the Oda-Tokugawa allied forces was classified into three types: domestic, South China and Korea, and Thailand. In contrast, Takeda's shot are nearly identical in composition to coins imported from China, indicating that they were manufactured by melting copper coins due to a shortage of lead. Katsuyori then instructed his troops to prepare ammunition of 200–300 rounds per gun after the Battle of Nagashino. From these facts, it can be inferred that the Takeda forces were overwhelmed by the Oda forces not only in the number of guns but also in the quantity of ammunition, and were defeated by a completely uninterrupted enemy barrage.

As seen above, the Battle of Nagashino was a battle between the Oda clan, which boasted abundant logistics and supplies in the west and the Kinai region, and the Takeda clan, which lacked such resources, in the east.

Meanwhile on more global perspective, professor Tatsuo Fujita viewed the Nagashino battle was an indicator of the Portuguese Empire ambition to make Japan as their colony through their Jesuit missionaries and merchant to gain favor of the prospective future benefactor, Oda Nobunaga. Fujita argued the indication were apparent in this battle by the fact that the rifle bullets which used by Takeda forces were only local manufacture product, while the Oda forces used imported bullets. Aside from that, Fujita also considered the close relationship between Nobunaga with the representative Catholic missionaries in the same time with the conflict between Oda clan with Takeda clan.

== Participating Military Commanders ==
=== Oda-Tokugawa Allied Forces ===
Main force of the battle of Nagashino

Generals of the Oda Army
Oda Nobunaga, Oda Nobutada, Oda Nobukatsu, Shibata Katsuie, Niwa Nagahide, Toyotomi Hideyoshi, Takigawa Kazumasu, Sakuma Nobumori, Mizuno Nobumoto, Takagi Kiyohide, Sugaya Nagayori, Kawajiri Hidetaka, Inaba Yoshimichi, Hineno Hironari, Ikeda Tsuneoki, Mori Nagayoshi, Gamō Ujisato, Sassa Narimasa, Maeda Toshiie, Harada Naomasa, Fukutomi Hidekatsu, Nonomura Masashige, Niwa Ujitsugu, Tokuyama Norihide, Nishio Yoshitsugu, Yuasa Naomune
Generals of the Tokugawa Army
Tokugawa Ieyasu, Imagawa Ujizane, Matsudaira Nobuyasu, Matsudaira Nobukazu, Matsudaira Sadakatsu, Matsudaira Shigekatsu, Matsudaira Tadamasa, Amano Yasukage, Ishikawa Kazumasa, Kōriki Kiyonaga, Honda Shigetsugu, Honda Tadakatsu, Honda Masashige, Honda Nobutoshi, Sakakibara Yasumasa, Torii Mototada, Ōkubo Tadayo, Ōkubo Tadasuke, Ōsuga Yasutaka, Hiraiwa Chikayoshi, Naitō Nobunari, Naitō Ienaga, Watanabe Moritsuna, Tanaka Yoshitada, Kōriki Masanaga, Yasutada Shibata, Asahina Yasukatsu, Kusakabe Sadayoshi

=== Takeda Army ===
Generals of the Takeda Army
Takeda Katsuyori, Takeda Nobukado, Takeda Nobutoyo, Mochizuki Nobunaga, Ichijō Nobutatsu, Takeda Nobutaka, Anayama Nobutada, Oyamada Nobushige, Yamagata Masakage, Yamagata Masatsugu, Naitō Masatoyo, Baba Nobuharu, Tsuchiya Masatsugu, Tsuchiya Masatsune, Tsuchiya Sadatsuna, Sanada Nobutsuna, Sanada Masateru, Sanada Masayuki, Kanbara Shigezumi, Hara Masatane, Atobe Katsusuke, Nagasaka Mitsukata, Obata Masamori, Obata Norishige, Amari Nobuyasu, Yasukage Yokota
