= Saegusa Moritomo =

Japanese samurai warrior

Saigusa Moritomo
- 三枝 守友
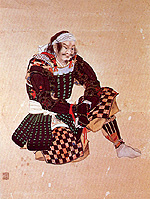
- Born: 1537
- Died: June 29, 1575 (aged 37–38); Nagashino, Mikawa Province (now Shinshiro, Aichi Prefecture)
- Relatives: Yamagata Masakage (father in law)
- Military career
- Allegiance: Takeda clan
- Conflicts: Battle of Mikatagahara (1573); Battle of Nagashino (1575)

Saigusa Moritomo (三枝 守友; 1537 – June 29, 1575) was a Japanese samurai warrior of the Sengoku period. He was known as one of the "Twenty-Four Generals of Takeda Shingen".

Moritomo was the son-in-law of the famed Takeda retainer Yamagata Masakage. Moritomo served Takeda clan during the Battle of Mikatagahara in 1572, and died at the Battle of Nagashino in 1575.
