= Gokurakuji =

Gokuraku-ji or Gokurakuji (Japanese: 極楽寺, romanized: lit. 'Sukhāvatī Temple') may refer to:

== Temples in Japan ==
- Gokuraku-ji (Naruto), founded in Naruto, Tokushima Prefecture in 815
- Gokuraku-ji (Kamakura), founded in Kamakura in 1259
- Gokuraku-ji (Kitakami) in Kitakami, Iwate Prefecture
- Gokuraku-ji (Saijō), in Saijō, Ehime Prefecture
- Gokuraku-ji, later renamed Jōmyō-ji, founded in Kamakura in 1188

== Other uses ==
- Gokurakuji Station, Kamakura, Kanagawa Prefecture, Japan
- Mount Gokurakuji, near Hatsukaichi, Hiroshima Prefecture
- Hōjō Shigetoki (born 1198), also called Lord Gokuraku-ji
