= Masatane =

- Gender: Male

Origin
- Origin: Japanese
- Meaning: Different meanings depending on the kanji used

Masatane (written: 昌胤 or 正種) is a masculine Japanese given name. Notable people with the name include:

- Hara Masatane (原 昌胤) (1531–1575), Japanese samurai
- Masatane Kanda (神田 正種) (1890–1983), Japanese general
