= Obu Toramasa =

Samurai who served the Takeda clan

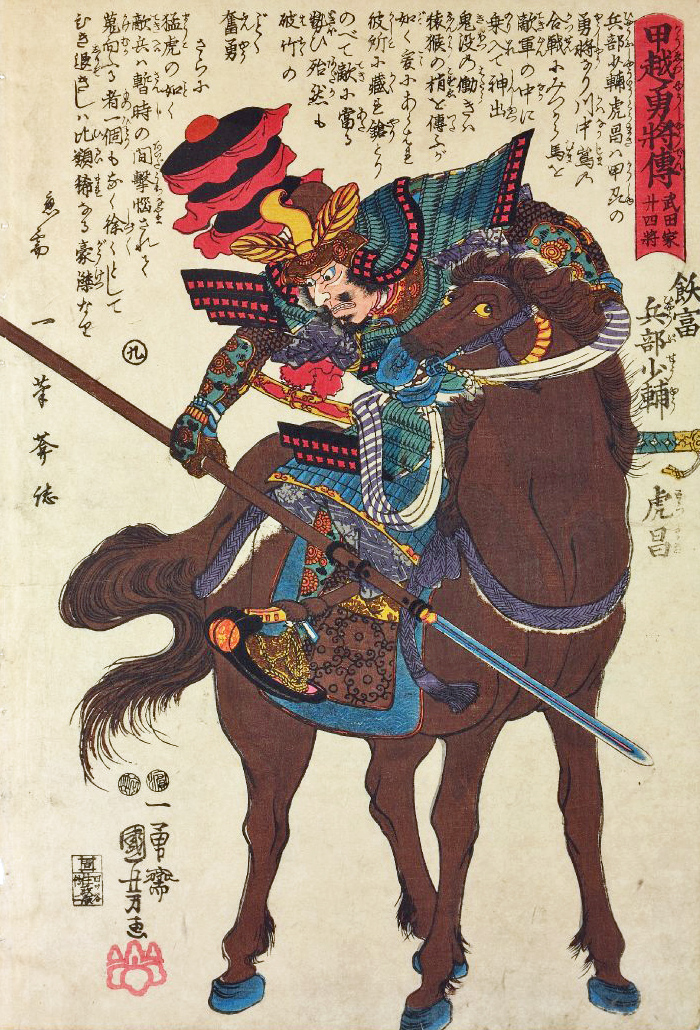
Obu Toramasa

Obu Toramasa (飯富 虎昌; 1504 – November 11, 1565), known as the "Wild Tiger of Kai", was a Japanese samurai of the Sengoku period, who served the Takeda clan. He was known as one of the "Twenty-Four Generals of Takeda Shingen". His younger brother was Yamagata Masakage.

He was the tutor of Takeda Shingen's younger brother Takeda Nobushige. He later betrayed Shingen with Shingen's eldest child, the rebellious Takeda Yoshinobu. A historically accurate account of his life is in the novel The Samurai's Tale written by Erik Christian Haugaard.

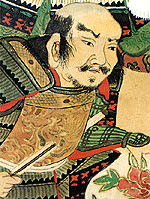
Obu Toramasa, a part of the twenty-four drawings of Takeda (Takeda Shrine Collection)
