= Natsume Yoshinobu =

Japanese samurai (1517–1573)

- 夏目 吉信
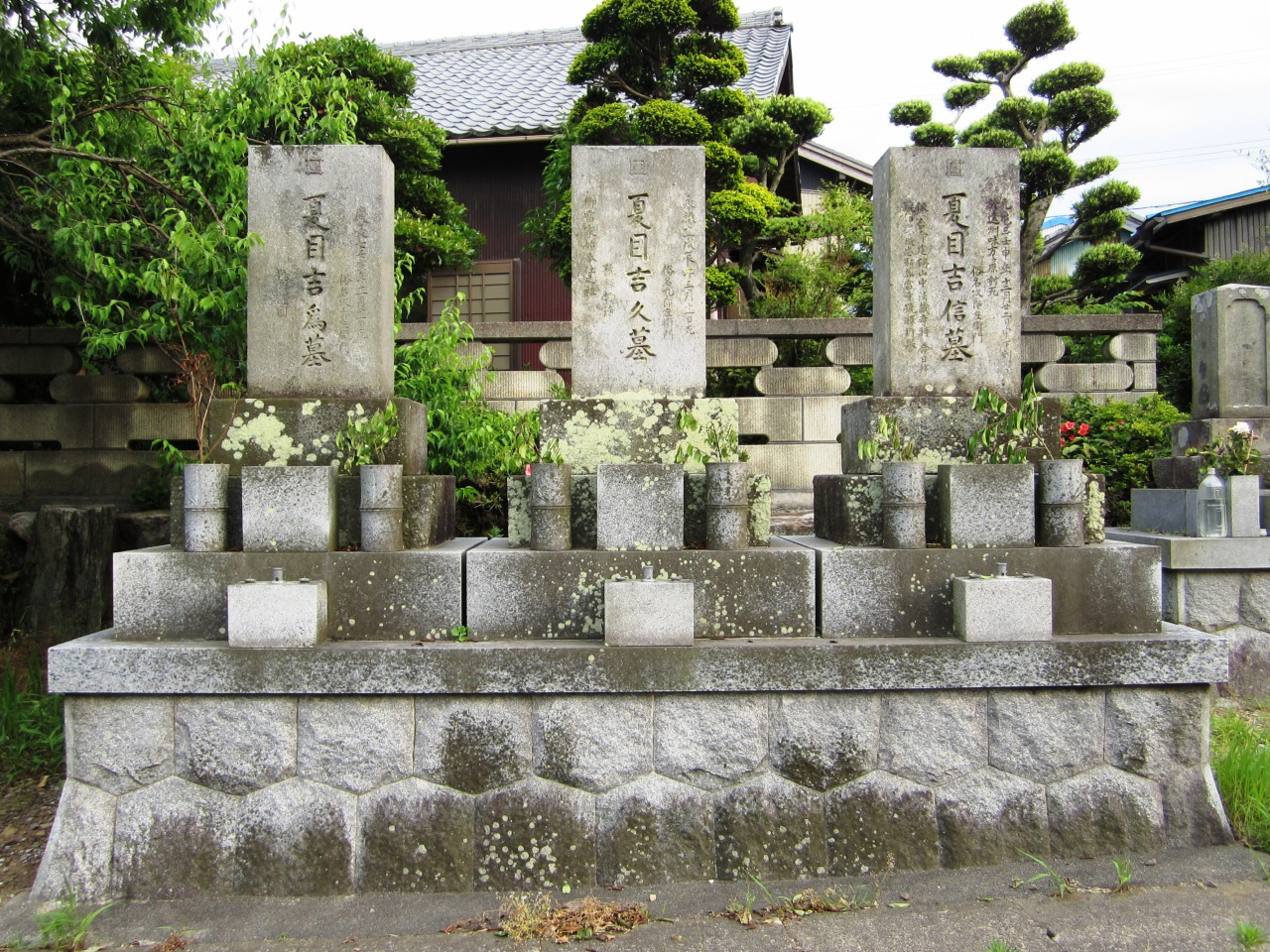
- Natsume Yoshinobu tomb
- Born: 1517; Mikawa province
- Died: 1573 (aged 55–56); Battle of Mikatagahara
- Military career
- Allegiance: Tokugawa clan
- Nickname: Jirō-Saemon
- Conflicts: Mikawa-Hachiman Conflicts (1562); Battle of Azukizaka (1564); Battle of Mikatagahara (1573)

Natsume Yoshinobu (夏目 吉信) (1517–1573) was a Japanese samurai of the Sengoku period who served the Matsudaira clan (later known as the Tokugawa clan). When Tokugawa forces had to retreat at the Battle of Mikatagahara, Natsume charged into enemy ranks declaring himself to be Ieyasu; he was then killed in battle.

== Early life ==
Natsume Yoshinobu was the son of Natsume Yoshihisa and was born in the Hazori District, Mikawa (modern day Kōta, Aichi). His legal alias was Jirō-Saemon. His family ancestor was the third child of Minamoto no Mitsuyoshi and his children branched off into various families in the east, including the Takeda and Ii families. Yoshinobu's family line descended from a branch that stayed within Mikawa and was one of the Seiwa Genji descendants serving the Matsudaira family.

During the Mikawa-Hachiman Conflicts between the Imagawa, Takeda, and Matsudaira families, he participated in the military forces at Nagasawa Castle and helped Itakura Shigezane attack another castle in 1562. When Motoyasu was on the verge of being surrounded by Imagawa forces, Yoshinobu was said to be among those who volunteered for the rear guard.

== Battle of Batogahara ==
In 1563, the Sōtō-shu practitioners threw in their lot and revolted in Mikawa. Joining the rebels were Yoshinobu, Honda Masanobu, Hachiya Sadatsugu and others whom were discontent serving Ieyasu. Rennyo's grandson, Kuzei, led the people into revolt since they felt their Honshōji beliefs were being robbed by Ieyasu's failed campaigns and sought to "reclaim" their origins. The reasons for the family vassals joining the rebels may stem from their desires to overtake Mikawa or due to lack of trust for Ieyasu. Confronting their former master at Noha Castle, Yoshinobu and others fought against troops led by Ieyasu's suppression forces. Like the other rebel family vassals, Yoshinobu was captured alive in July 1563. Ieyasu forgave his crimes and was once again granted his rights as a retainer. He sought to redeem his image by helping the subjugation effort.

By January 1564, the rebels were quelled but the lasting impact of their fall caused a rift with Ieyasu's supporters. Those who felt sympathy for the rebels thought they had failed to live up to the people's trust, their loyalties hurt by Ieyasu's choice to subjugate them.

== Battle of Mikatagahara ==
In 1573, regardless of whatever Yoshinobu thought of his lord afterwards, he didn't hesitate to ride to Ieyasu's rescue during the disaster at Battle of Mikatagahara. He was made the main guard of Hamamatsu Castle until he noticed his lord's distress and personally rode out of the keep with twenty horsemen. Yoshinobu was able to meet up with Ieyasu and their men frantically thrashed against Takeda Katsuyori's cavalry in hot pursuit. Ieyasu, broken and desolate at the sight of his own men dying before him, was carried on Yoshinobu's back to escape the scene. Losing his own pages to the chaos, Yoshinobu dropped his lord and took Ieyasu's horse. He told Ieyasu he would pose as his lord as a decoy for the real Ieyasu to escape.

== Historical Account ==
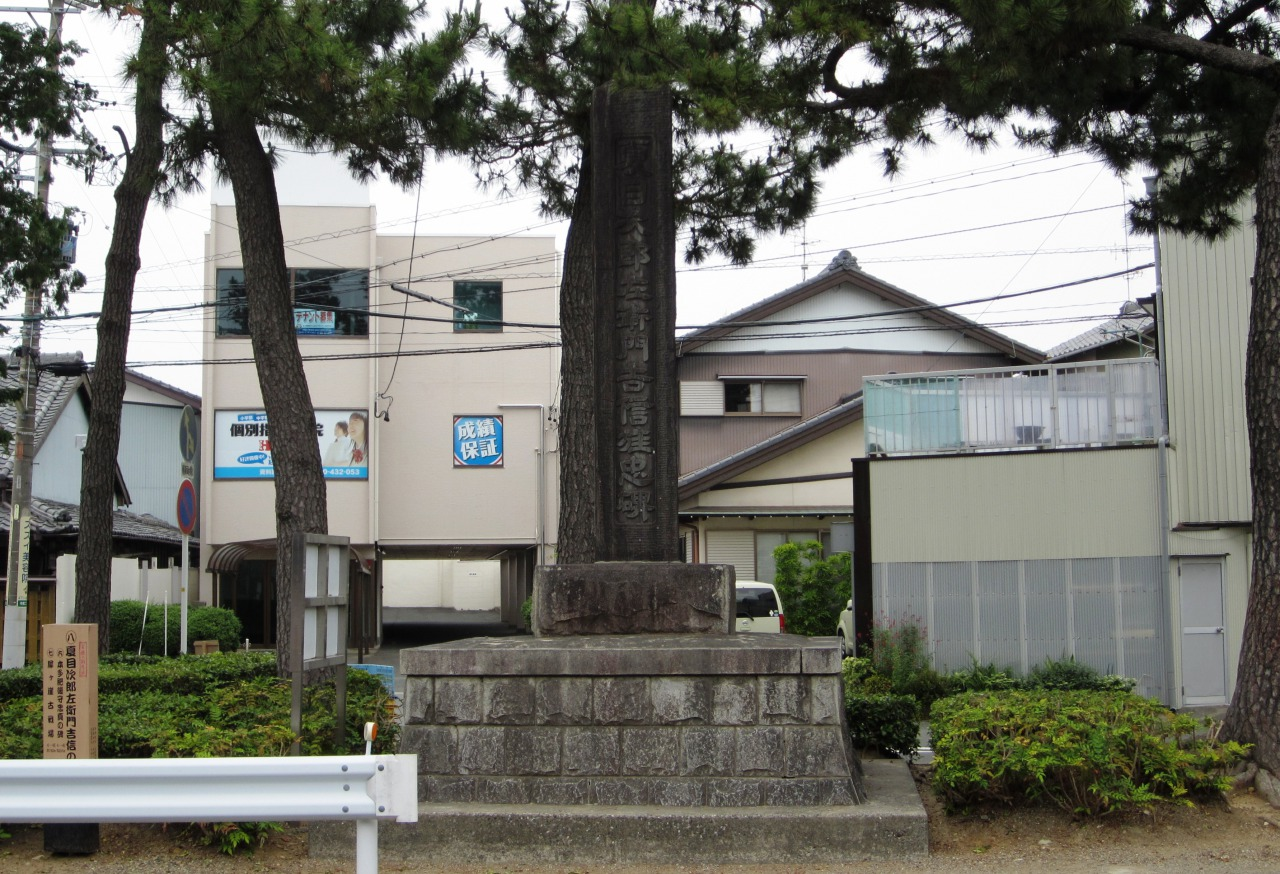
The monument of Natsume Yoshinobu in Hamamatsu, Shizuoka

In a variation of the account, Ieyasu was too dumbstruck to respond to his original plea so Yoshinobu patronized, "What good would a spiritless one such as yourself do me!? Off with you!" The words were enough to finally get Ieyasu moving. Yoshinobu mounted Ieyasu's horse and charged at the Takeda forces as promised, losing his life in battle. According to the Mikawa Monogatari, the retainer was an elderly man by this time.

Ieyasu never forgot Yoshinobu's sacrifice and treated his retainer's son with respect. He once said to Yoshinobu's son, Natsume Yoshitsugu during the Siege of Osaka, "If not of your father, I would not be alive here today."
