= Nagano Narimasa =

Japanese samurai and engineer (1491–1561)

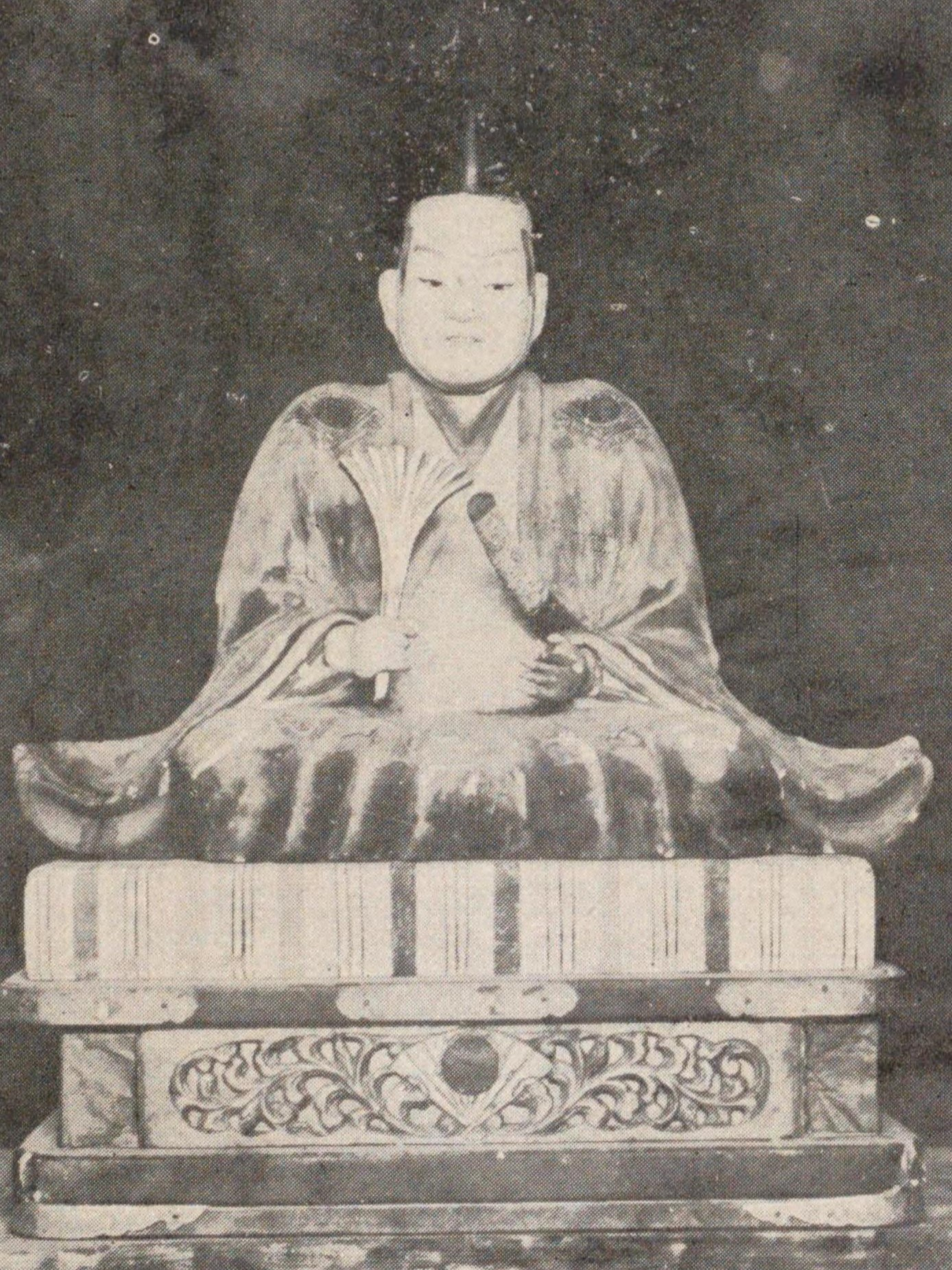
Nagano Narimasa

Nagano Narimasa (長野 業正; 1491–1561) was a Japanese samurai retainer of the Uesugi clan during the Sengoku period and lord of Gunma. He was known for building Minowa Castle in 1526, and his skill at castle defense.

He employed the famous spearman Kamiizumi Nobutsuna, who founded the Shinkage-ryū swordsmanship school. He gave shelter to Sanada Yukitaka after Yukitaka was defeated by Murakami Yoshikiyo, a daimyō of Shinano in 1541.

He served prominently during the attack on Yamanaka Castle, held by Hōjō Ujiyasu, and when he defended Minowa Castle against Takeda Shingen for no less than seven years. The records of Chōnen-ji, the temple where Nagano was buried, dates his death to 1566. Only after his death did the castle fall to Shingen.

According to Shōden Shinkage-ryū, there were 16 retainers under him who were called the "Sixteen Spears of Nagano House". Among them, Kamiizumi Nobutsuna and Nagano Zaemon was listed as top students. Nagano Zaemon went on to found a style of Koppojutsu and Sojutsu called Gyoshin Ryu.

The Densho called Shinken Shobu Mokuroku, which was originally written in 1603, was destroyed in World War II and was rewritten by a distant relative named Nagano Shigazato in 1981. Today it is rumored that a distant branch called Nagano Ryu Heihou is the keeper of the revised densho and was founded with its core teachings coming from the Shiken Shobu Mokuroku but this is a rumor and has not been proven.
