= Obata Masamori =

Japanese samurai (1534-1582)

- 小幡昌盛
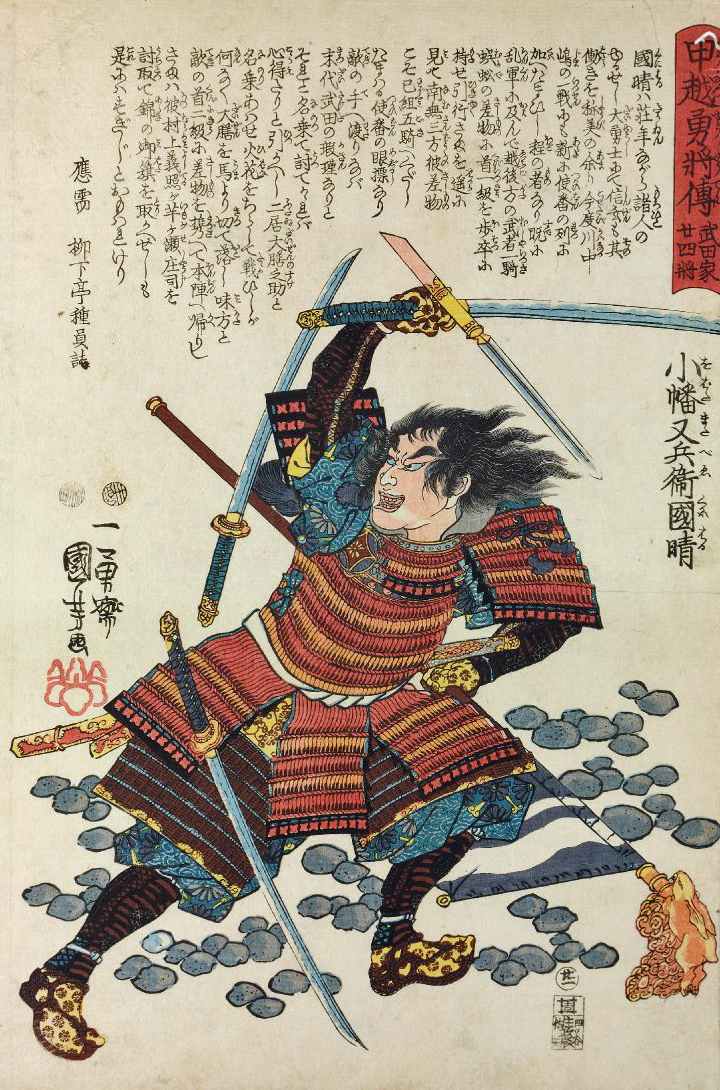
- Born: 1534
- Died: March 29, 1582 (aged 47–48)
- Military career
- Allegiance: Takeda clan
- Conflicts: Siege of Odawara (1569); Battle of Mimasetoge (1569); Battle of Mikatagahara (1573); Battle of Nagashino (1575)

Obata Masamori (小幡昌盛; 1534 – March 29, 1582), was a Japanese samurai warrior. He is known as one of the "Twenty-Four Generals of Takeda Shingen".

== Family ==
Masamori was the son of Obata Toramori, and came from western Kozuke province. He fled Kozuke and joined the Takeda around 1560. Masamori would later become the lord of Kaizu castle in Shinano province.

== Military career ==
Coming from a province conquered by the Takeda, Masamori belonged to the sakikata-shu (the group of vanquished enemies) within the Takeda establishment, but proved himself repeatedly by loyal service. He fought for the Takeda at the battle of Mimasetoge (1569).

In the Battle of Mikatagahara (1573), he led the cavalry vanguard.

In the Battle of Nagashino (1575), he supplied the largest cavalry contingent, commanding 500 mounted samurai and 1000 footmen. In the central company, commanded by Takeda Nobukado, he charged the Oda line beside the other Kozuke warlords. Eventually, as the Takeda army made no headway, the attack was called off but not until grave losses had been suffered.

== See also ==
- Isao Obata
