= Naitō Masatoyo =

Japanese samurai (1522–1575)

- 内藤 昌豊
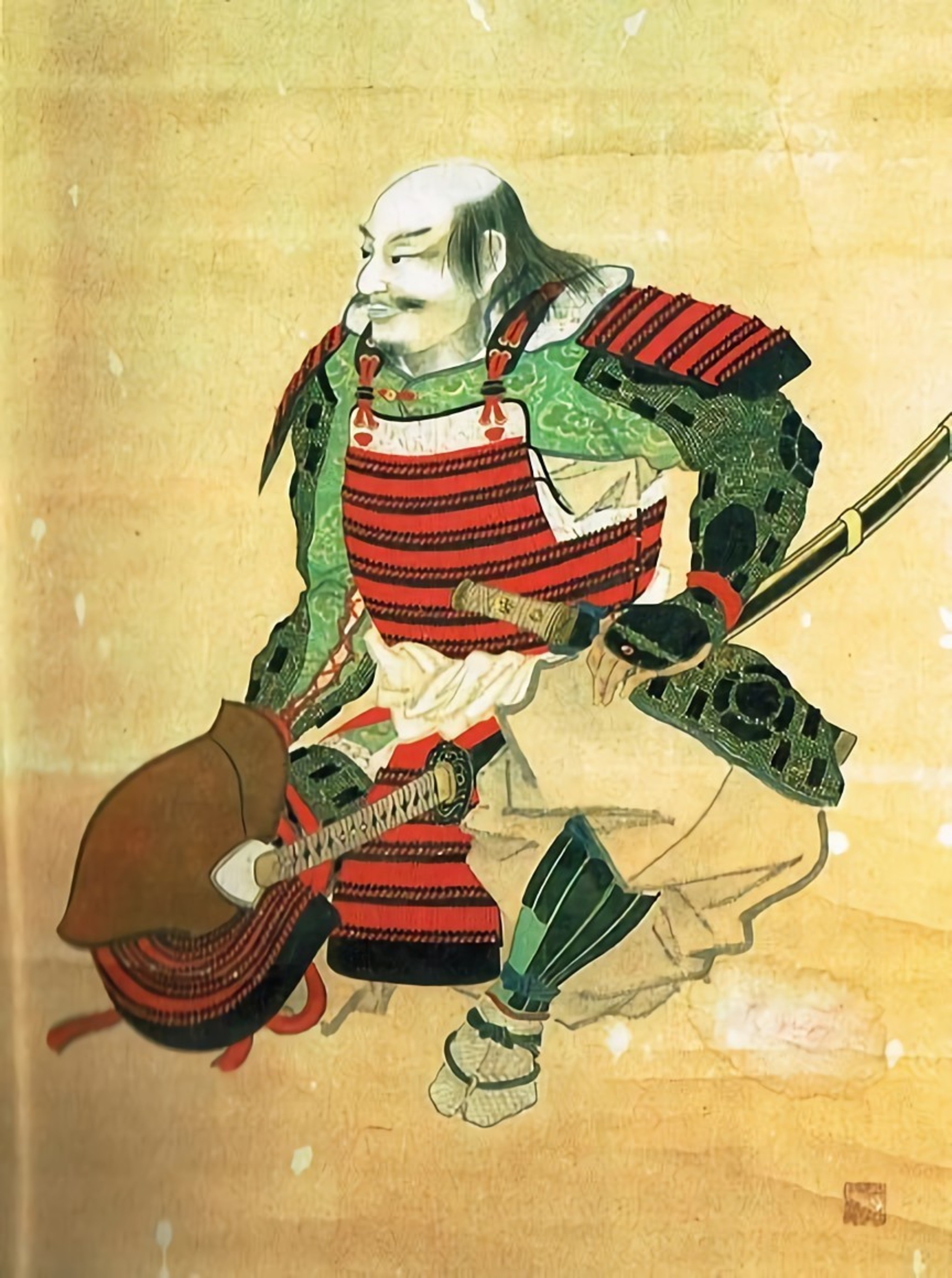
- Born: Kudō Sukenaga; 1522
- Died: June 29, 1575 (aged 52–53)
- Military career
- Allegiance: Takeda clan
- Nickname: Naitō Masahide
- Conflicts: Siege of Minowa (1566); Battle of Mikatagahara (1573); Battle of Nagashino (1575)

Naitō Masatoyo (内藤 昌豊) Naitō Masahide (内藤 政秀) (1522 – June 29, 1575) was a Japanese samurai of the Sengoku period. He was known as one of the "Twenty-Four Generals of Takeda Shingen". Masatoyo was the second son of Takeda Nobutora's senior retainer, Kudō Toratoyo. He was first called Kudō Sukenaga. The family's fortunes fell when Toratoyo lost favor with Nobutora and was killed by him.

== Military life ==
In 1566 he was given Minowa Castle in Kōzuke Province after it fell to the Takeda (Siege of Minowa).

At Mikatagahara (1573) he led a charge into the Tokugawa ranks and was at the forefront of the fighting at Nagashino (1575). He had opposed the attack at Nagashino and, in the course of the battle, was shot many times by arrows before being beheaded by Asahina Yasukatsu. He had been noted for his warm disposition and his equally impressive talents in warfare and administration. He had even been a mentor to the young Katsuyori, Takeda Shingen's fourth son.

== Personal life ==
Sukenaga and his brother escaped the Takeda clan and, according to the predominant theory, they wandered around the Kantō region. After Nobutora was exiled by his son Takeda Shingen, Shingen recalled the Kudō brothers, reinstating their lands and permitting the family's restoration. Shingen also formally excused Toratoyo of any wrongdoing and sent a letter of apology and money to the family. Furthermore, the Kudō were given command of 50 cavalry and granted the rank of samurai-taishō (侍大将).

== Death ==
In 1575, at Battle of Nagashino, after disagreeing with Katsuyori, he rushed into battle, dying an honorable death.
