= Minowa Castle =

Building in Takasaki, Gunma Prefecture, Japan

- 箕輪城
- Takasaki, Gunma Prefecture, Japan
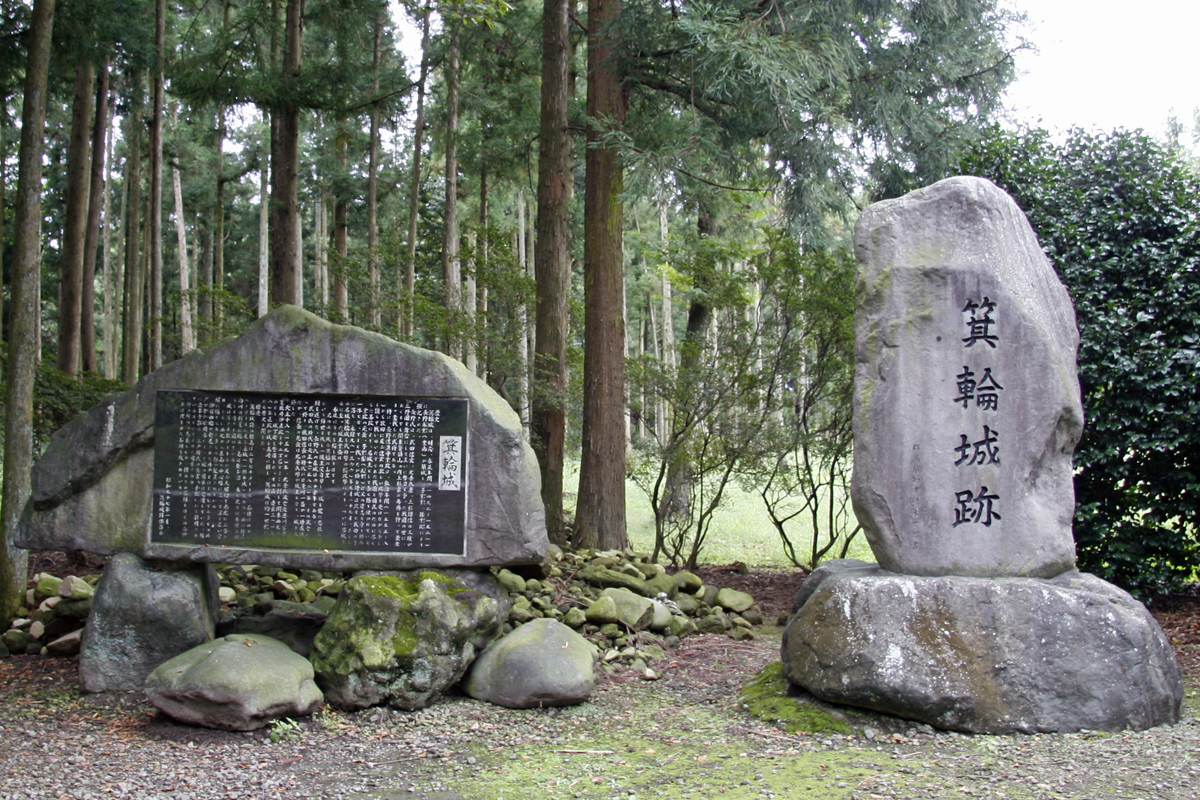

Site information
- Type: Hirayama- style Japanese
- Controlled by: Nagano clan, Takeda clan, Ii clan,
- Condition: ruins

Location
- Ne Castle Minowa Castle (Japan)
- Coordinates: 36°24′17.82″N 138°57′3.45″E

Site history
- Built: 1512
- Demolished: 1598

Garrison information
- Past commanders: Nagano Narimasa, Nagano Narimori, Sanada Yukitaka, Takigawa Kazumasu, Hōjō Ujikuni, Ii Naomasa

Minowa Castle (箕輪城, Minowa-jō) was a "hirayama"-style castle located in the Misato neighborhood of the city of Takasaki, Gunma Prefecture, Japan. The ruins have been protected by the central government as a National Historic Site since 1987.

== Background ==
Minowa Castle is located on a 30-meter high hill at the end of long ridge which extends from Mount Haruna southwest towards former Misato town in the northwestern part of Takasaki. This area was located on the Nakasendō highway towards Shinano Province to the west and also on the Mikuni Kaidō towards Echigo Province to the north. The castle, protected on one side by a deep valley created by the Shirakawa River and on its long, narrow hill, commanded both strategic roads.

The castle extends over an area 1200 meters long by 400 meters wide orientated north and southward, having two small ridges at its south end. Roughly the castle consists of three concentric layers of enclosures. The main gate of the castle originally existed at southwestern edge of the hill, but later a huge masugata-style gate was built next to the river.

== History ==
During the Muromachi period, this area was governed by the Nagano clan, who claimed descent from Ariwara no Narihira, the famed Heian period nobleman and poet. By the Muromachi period, the Nagano clan were minor warlords controlling western Kōzuke Province and built Minowa castle as their residence in 1512. In 1545, Uesugi Norimasa, the Kantō Kanrei and nominal overlord of the Nagano clan, was severely defeated by the forces of Hōjō Ujiyasu at the 1546 Battle of Kawagoe. His forces were also defeated by Takeda Shingen the following year. With the weakening of the Uesugi, Nagano Narimasa (1491–1561) switched allegiance to the Hōjō. In 1560, the Uesugi clan under the leadership of Uesugi Kenshin attempted to re-take Kōzuke and the Nagano clan switched allegiance back to the Uesugi. Takeda Shingen then attacked the Uesugi in support of the Hōjō, and the Nagano at Minowa Castle were their primary targets. When Nagano Narimasa died in 1561, he stated in his will that his son Nagano Narimori should continue the fight against Takeda Shingen to the last man if necessary. Narimori continued to resist the Takeda for the next five years, but gradually lost the support of his surrounding neighbors and allies. Finally, in 1566, during the Siege of Minowa by 20,000 Takeda soldiers a sortie out of the castle was led by Kamiizumi Nobutsuna, this, however, resulted in a successful counter assault by the Shingen forces. The entire castle fell, and after desperate fight Nagano Narimori killed himself in the inner Bailey of Minowa Castle. A small portion was still held by Kamiizumi Nobutsuna, which so impressed by Nobutsuna that he let Nobutsuna leave unharmed, even asking Nobutsuna to join him (Nobutsuna declined).

Takeda Shingen used Minowa Castle has his regional headquarters in Kōzuke, and at various times appointed generals such as Sanada Yukitaka and Naitō Masatoyo as castellans. Under the Takeda, the castle was expanded by the construction of a redoubt called the "Maru Umadashi" (a half rounded buffer area with a crescent shaped dry moat in front of the gate) to protect the castle's vulnerable northeastern edge. After the annihilation of the Takeda clan by Oda Nobunaga in 1582, the castle was awarded to Takigawa Kazumasa. However, only three months later, Nobunaga was assassinated in the Honnō-ji Incident. On hearing of Nobunaga's death, the Hōjō clan immediately seized Minowa Castle, recognizing its strategic importance. The Hōjō also modified the defenses of the castle in line with contemporary fortification technology.

In 1590, when Toyotomi Hideyoshi began his campaign against the Hōjō, he sent a large army along the Nakasendō against Minowa Castle. However, the garrison at the castle surrendered without a fight. Subsequently, the Kantō region was awarded to Tokugawa Ieyasu, who assigned Ii Naomasa as castellan. Ii Naomasa significantly expanded the castle and dug deep and wide dry moats and replaced earthen ramparts with stone walls along the main route into the castle. In 1598, he built Takasaki Castle and relocated his seat there. Minowa Castle was abandoned and allowed to fall into ruin.

== Current situation ==
All that remains of Minowa Castle currently are the ruins of the stone walls, earthworks, and moats. The site is unusual due to its large size, as it occupies forty-seven hectares (120 acres), making it one of the largest castle sites in Gunma Prefecture. Minowa Castle was listed as one of Japan's Top 100 Castles by the Japan Castle Foundation in 2006.

== See also ==
- List of Historic Sites of Japan (Gunma)

== Literature ==
- Schmorleitz, Morton S. (1974). Castles in Japan. Tokyo: Charles E. Tuttle Co. pp. 144–145. ISBN 0-8048-1102-4.
- De Lange, William (2021). An Encyclopedia of Japanese Castles. Groningen: Toyo Press. p. 600. ISBN 978-9492722300.
- Motoo, Hinago (1986). Japanese Castles. Tokyo: Kodansha. p. 200 pages. ISBN 0-87011-766-1.
- Mitchelhill, Jennifer (2004). Castles of the Samurai: Power and Beauty. Tokyo: Kodansha. p. 112 pages. ISBN 4-7700-2954-3.
- Turnbull, Stephen (2003). Japanese Castles 1540-1640. Osprey Publishing. p. 64 pages. ISBN 1-84176-429-9.
