= Siege of Minowa =

Japanese battle in 1566

- Part of Sengoku period
Date	1566
Location	Minowa Castle, Kōzuke province 36°24′16″N 138°57′05″E
Result	Siege successful; Takeda victory

Belligerents
Uesugi clan	Forces of Takeda Shingen

Commanders and leaders
Kamiizumi Hidetsuna; Nagano Narimori †	Takeda Shingen; Naitō Masatoyo

Strength
3,000	5,000
- Location within Gunma Prefecture Siege of Minowa (Japan)

The 1566 siege of Minowa was one of several battles fought by the Takeda clan in their campaigns to seize the lands of the Uesugi clan, during Japan's Sengoku period. It is part of a larger power struggle between Takeda Shingen and Uesugi Kenshin.

== Background ==
Some years before, Nagano Narimasa, lord of Minowa Castle and faithful retainer to the Uesugi, died. In order to protect the region from the depredations of the Takeda, the Nagano family kept his death a secret until his heir could settle into power.

== Siege ==
The Takeda attacked in 1566, and were held off for a time, with the young heir, Nagano Narimori, and famous swordsman Kamiizumi Hidetsuna, leading the defense. Intense hand-to-hand fighting eventually led to Hidetsuna leading a bold charge from the castle, which was initially successful. However, Narimori was killed soon afterwards, and the castle fell.

== Aftermath ==
Naitō Masatoyo was given Minowa Castle in Kōzuke Province after it fell to the Takeda.
