= Oyamada Nobushige =

Japanese samurai general

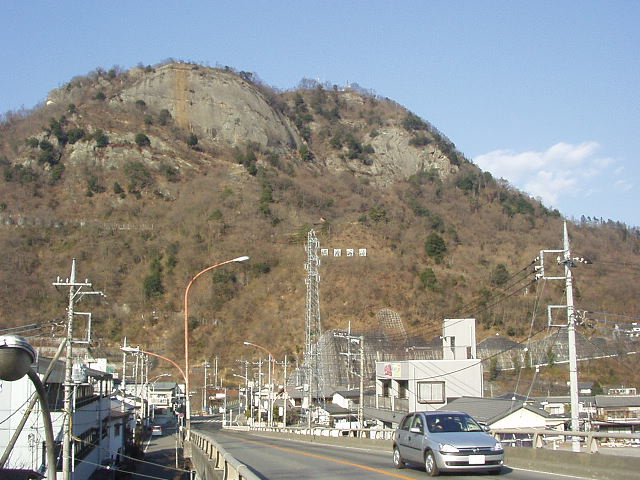
Iwadono Castle

Oyamada Nobushige Mon

Oyamada Nobushige (小山田 信茂, 1545 – April 16, 1582) was a Japanese samurai general in the Takeda army under Takeda Shingen, and later under Takeda Katsuyori. He was known as one of the "Twenty-Four Generals of Takeda Shingen".

He was also lord of Iwadono Castle, and fought under the Takeda at the battles of Kawanakajima (1561), Mikatagahara (1573), Nagashino (1575) and Tenmokuzan (1582).

Oyamada betrayed Takeda Katsuyori in 1582, after Katsuyori's defeat at the Battle of Tenmokuzan; however, when he went to the Oda clan camp, he was executed by Oda Nobunaga's officer Horio Yoshiharu.
