= Iwadono Castle =

Coordinates: 35°37′18.4″N 138°56′58.6″E

- 岩殿山城
- Ōtsuki, Yamanashi, Japan
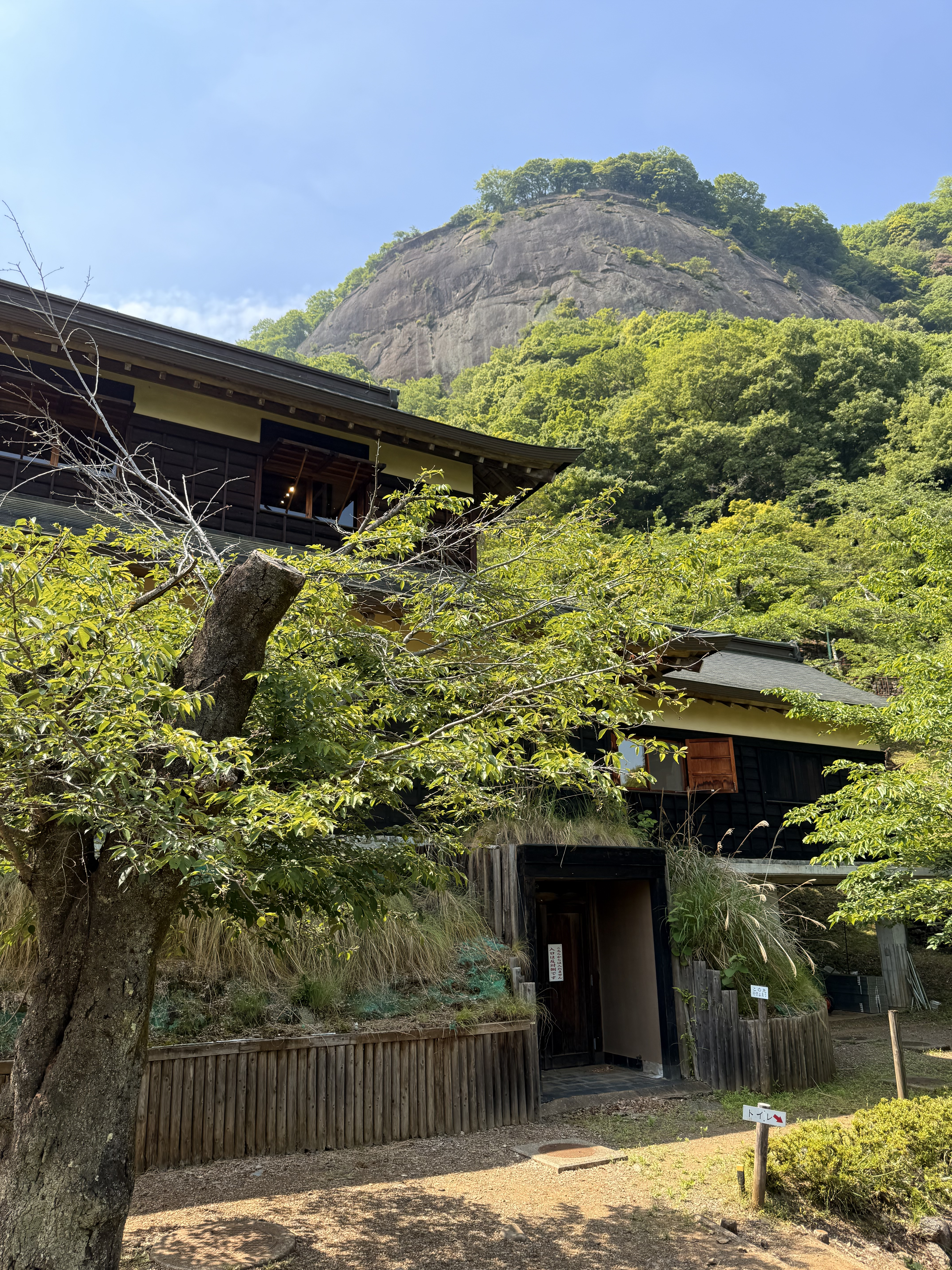
- View of the Iwadono Castle site upon the mountain top

Site information
- Type: Yamajiro-style castle
- Open to the public: Yes
- Condition: Ruins

Site history
- Built: 16th century
- Built by: Oyamada clan
- In use: Sengoku period
- Demolished: 1582

Iwadono Castle (岩殿城, Iwadono-jō) was a yamajiro located in present-day Ōtsuki, Yamanashi Prefecture, Japan. The castle was active during the Sengoku period and served as a strategic outpost of the Takeda clan of Kai Province. Though now in ruins, it remains a popular destination for hikers and history enthusiasts.

== History ==
=== Origins ===
Iwadono Castle is believed to have been constructed in the early 16th century by the local Oyamada clan, who served as retainers of the Takeda. The castle was built on Mount Iwadono, a steep peak that commanded views over the Kōshū Kaidō, a vital transportation route connecting the Takeda heartlands with the eastern provinces.

=== Takeda Period ===
Under Takeda Shingen (1521–1573), Iwadono Castle was significantly fortified and became a crucial defensive site along the Takeda clan's eastern frontier. Oyamada Nobushige, a senior Takeda general, was appointed lord of the castle. Iwadono's elevated position and natural defenses made it an ideal location for a mountain fortress.

=== Fall of the Castle ===
In 1582, the Takeda clan was destroyed following an invasion by the allied forces of Oda Nobunaga and Tokugawa Ieyasu. Oyamada Nobushige initially resisted but later surrendered Iwadono Castle to the Oda forces. Hoping for clemency, he was instead executed by Oda Nobunaga, who distrusted the late defection. This marked the end of the castle's military role.

== Structure ==
Iwadono Castle followed the typical layout of a yamajiro, utilizing the steep terrain for defense. The main keep (honmaru) was located at the summit, with terraced baileys (ninomaru and sannomaru) built into the mountainside. The castle employed stone walls, dry moats, and wooden palisades. Today, only remnants of these features remain.

== Current Status ==
The castle site is maintained as a public park and is accessible via a hiking trail from Ōtsuki Station. The summit offers panoramic views of Mount Fuji and the surrounding mountains. Interpretive signs guide visitors through the historical features of the site.

== Access ==
- Location: Ōtsuki, Yamanashi Prefecture, Japan
- Nearest Station: Ōtsuki Station (JR Chūō Main Line)
- Hiking Time: Approximately 1–1.5 hours to summit
- Entry Fee: Free

== Gallery ==
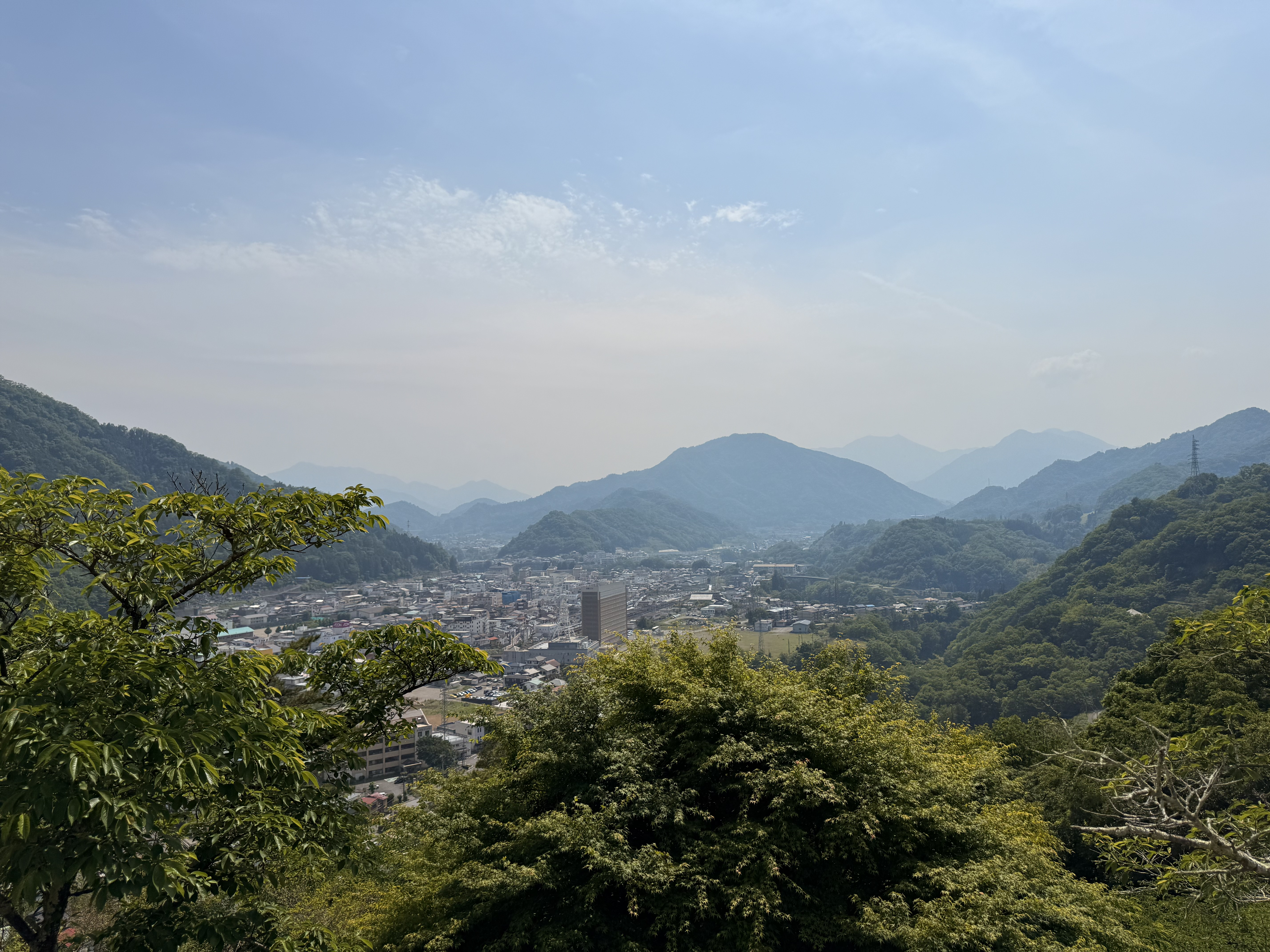
View of Otsuki City from the base of Iwadono Mountain

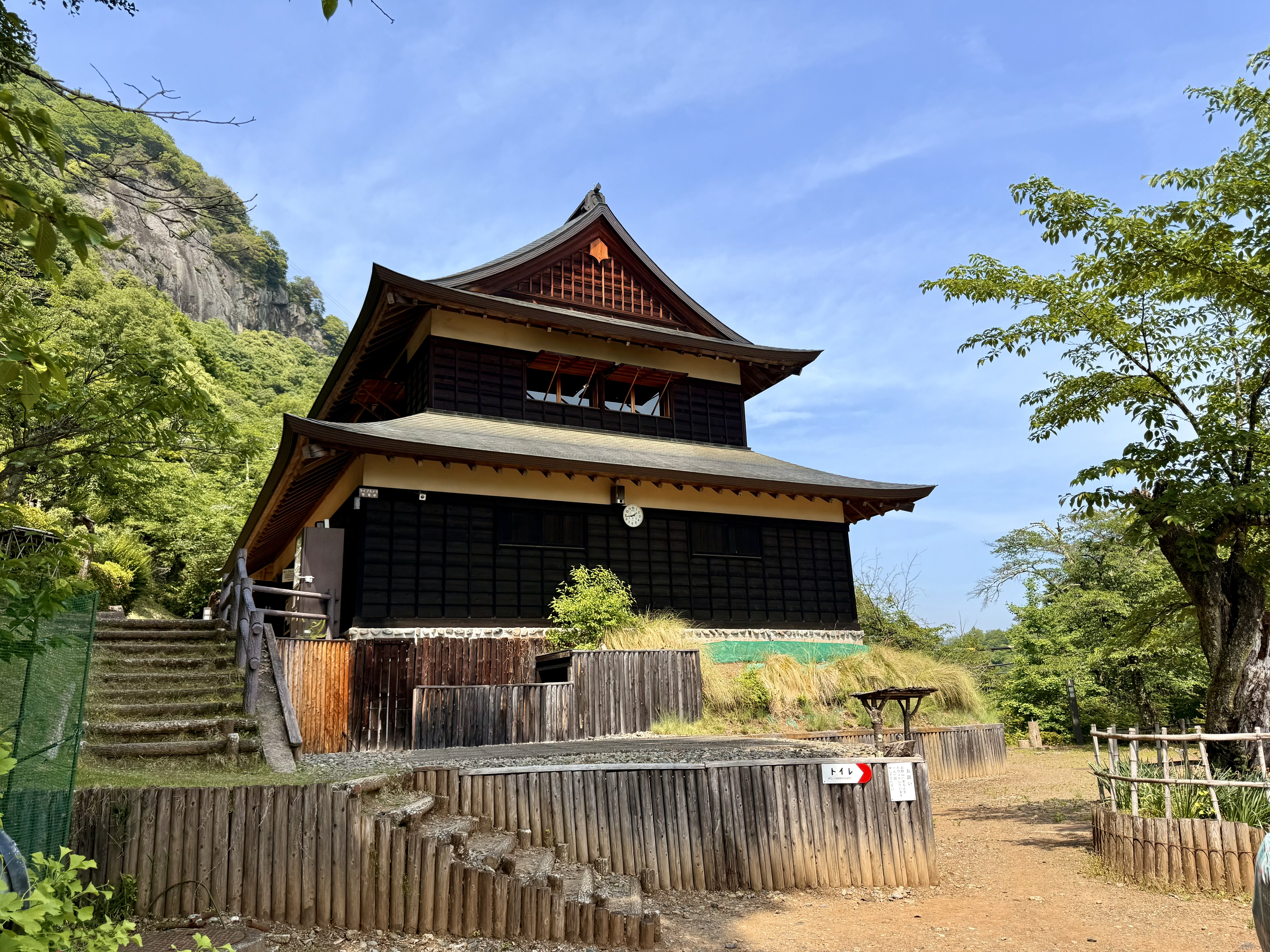
Iwadono Mountain Fureai Community Center constructed in the form of a castle keep

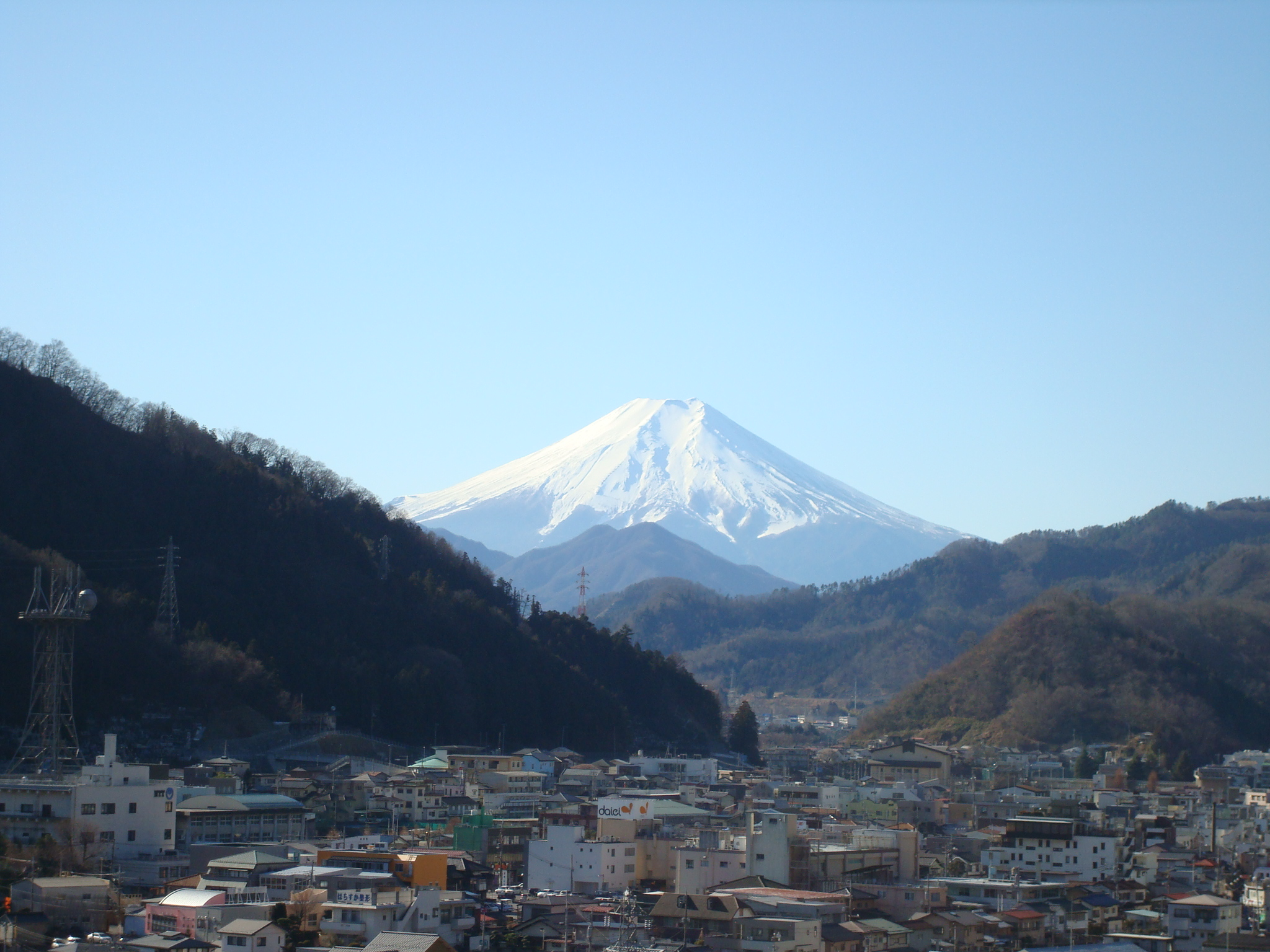
View of Mount Fuji from the summit

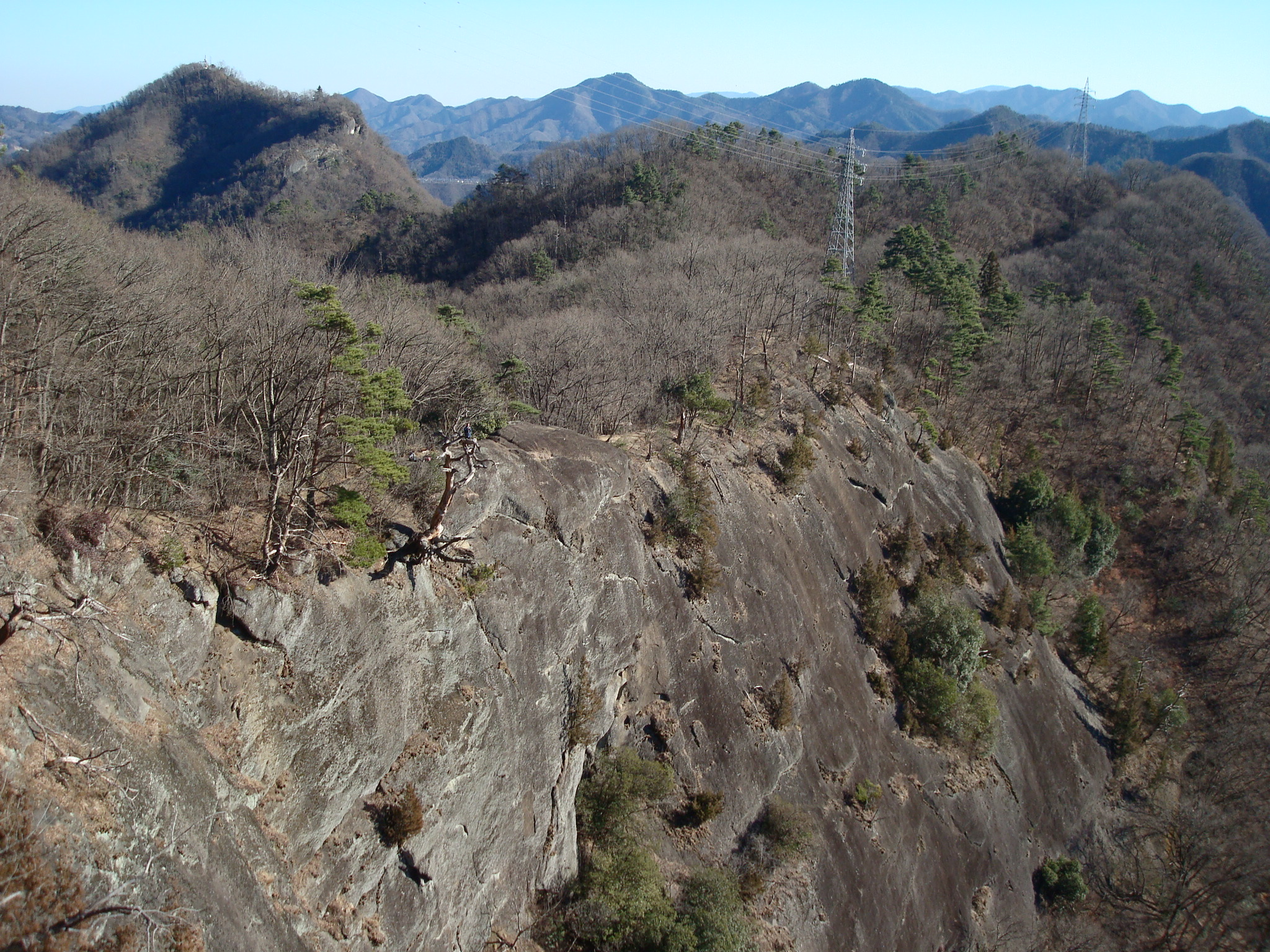
Mt. Iwadono is in the background on the left

== See also ==
- Takeda Shingen
- Takeda clan
- Japanese castle
- Sengoku period
- List of Historic Sites of Japan (Yamanashi)
