= Battle of Mikatagahara =

1573 battle in Japan

Coordinates: 34°42′36″N 137°43′09″E

- Part of the Sengoku period
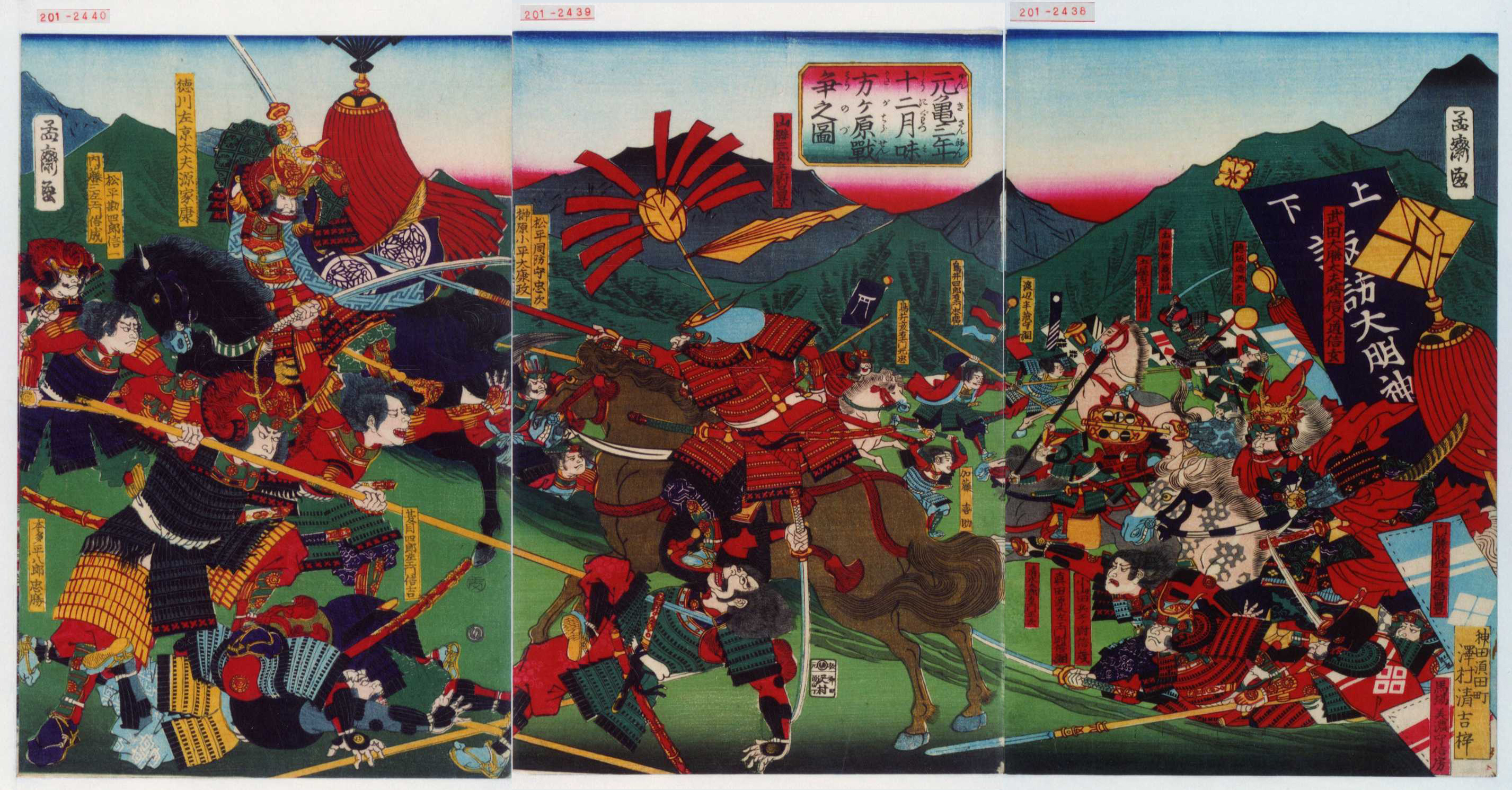
- Battle of Mikatagahara
Date	January 25, 1573
Location	Mikatagahara, Tōtōmi Province, Japan
Result	Takeda clan victory: Tokugawa Ieyasu retreat; Takeda Shingen withdrawal

Belligerents
Takeda clan	Tokugawa clan Oda clan

Commanders and leaders
Takeda Shingen; Takeda Katsuyori; Baba Nobuharu; Naitō Masatoyo; Yamagata Masakage; Obata Masamori; Saegusa Moritomo; Oyamada Nobushige	Tokugawa Ieyasu; Sakai Tadatsugu; Ōkubo Tadayo; Ishikawa Kazumasa; Amano Yasukage; Hattori Hanzō; Watanabe Moritsuna; Honda Tadakatsu; Sakakibara Yasumasa; Sakuma Nobumori; Takigawa Kazumasu

Strength
35,000 Takeda	11,000 total (8,000 Tokugawa, 3,000 Oda reinforcements)

Casualties and losses
500 to 3,000	Almost completely annihilated

The Battle of Mikatagahara (三方ヶ原の戦い, Mikatagahara no tatakai) took place during the Sengoku period of Japan between Takeda Shingen and Tokugawa Ieyasu in Tōtōmi Province on January 25, 1573. Shingen attacked Ieyasu on the plain of Mikatagahara north of Hamamatsu during his campaign against Oda Nobunaga while seeking a route from Kōfu to Kyoto. The Tokugawa-Oda force was almost totally annihilated by the Takeda after being encircled and many of Ieyasu's retainers were killed in the battle. Ieyasu and his surviving men were forced to retreat before launching a minor counterattack to delay Shingen's march towards Kyoto.

== Background ==
In 1571, Aoyama Tadamon, vassal of Ieyasu and leader of the Aoyama clan, resisted the Takeda when they launched their invasion of Mikawa via Asuke Castle. Tadamon managed to thwart their early incursion by constructing a series of palisades. He also later repulsed the Takeda at Shinpukuji, to the north of Dōdo Castle of Mikawa. However, Tadamon was killed in a battle by a gunshot. He was succeeded by his son, Aoyama Tadanari.

In October 1572, after having concluded alliances with his rivals to the east (the Later Hōjō clan of Odawara and the Satomi clan of Awa), and after waiting for the snow to close off the northern mountain passes against his northern rival, Uesugi Kenshin, Takeda Shingen led an army of 30,000 men south from his capital of Kōfu into Tōtōmi Province, while Yamagata Masakage led a second force of 5,000 men into eastern Mikawa Province. They quickly captured Yoshida Castle and Futamata Castle.

Shingen was opposed by Tokugawa Ieyasu, based at Hamamatsu Castle with 8,000 men, plus an additional 3,000 reinforcements received from his ally, Oda Nobunaga. However, Shingen's intent was not to attack Ieyasu nor to seize Hamamatsu; rather, he wished to avoid conflict if possible to save his forces for attacking Nobunaga and marching on Kyoto. In the same month, Ieyasu sent Naitō Nobunari, Honda Tadakatsu, and Ōkubo Tadasuke, to lead the vanguard, where they met Takeda forces led by Yamagata Masakage and Baba Nobuharu at the Battle of Hitokotosaka. At the end of this battle, Tadakatsu and Nobunari fought well, as both of them managed to break through the encirclement attempts by the Takeda forces and escape safely with the Tokugawa forces.

Against the advice provided by Sakuma Nobumori and Takigawa Kazumasu, who had been sent by Nobunaga, and by his own generals, Matsudaira Koretada and Ishikawa Kazumasa, Ieyasu refused to allow the Takeda to pass through his territory unhindered, and drew up his forces on a high plain called Mikatagahara, at the time located just north of Hamamatsu.

According to the Kōyō Gunkan, a record of the Takeda family's military exploits, Shingen outnumbered Ieyasu three-to-one, and organized his men into the gyorin (魚鱗, fish-scale) formation, enticing his opponent to attack. Oyamada Nobushige was in Shingen's vanguard, followed by Naitō Masatoyo and Yamagata Masakage. The third line was commanded by Katsuyori and Obata Masamori, while Baba Nobuharu was in the fourth. Opposing him, Ieyasu had gathered his available forces and arrayed them in a line.

Historian Kawai Atsushi viewed that Ieyasu's decision to meet the far superior Takeda army was not a gamble, but rather a necessity due to the pressure to maintain respect from the highly aggressive and proud Mikawa samurai clans. Atsushi argued that if Ieyasu had refused to fight the invading Takeda, it would have caused him to lose respect among Mikawa samurai and weakened his control of the province.

== Battle ==
=== First Takeda attack ===
At around four in the afternoon as snow began to fall, Tokugawa arquebusiers accompanied by a number of peasant stone-throwers opened fire upon the Takeda formation. Firearms, still somewhat new to Japanese warfare, were a known deterrent to cavalry assaults. Ieyasu had expected his superior weaponry to overcome Shingen's overwhelming forces and formation, but this assumption was quickly dispelled as Naitō Masatoyo's vanguard cavalry attacked and rapidly overran Honda Tadakatsu's segment on the Tokugawa right.

Takeda horsemen exploited the opening and rapidly assaulted the accompanying Oda reinforcements before charging the Tokugawa rear. Oda forces were quickly overrun and routed, with officer Hirate Hirohide killed, and Sakuma Nobumori and Takigawa Kazumasu fleeing the battle. A similar attack on the left was thwarted as Tokugawa units refused to yield ground and shrugged off the advance of the Takeda right, preventing an encirclement of the Tokugawa center.

=== Second Takeda attack ===
Shingen then withdrew his vanguard, offering them an opportunity to rest. He brought forward a new set of horsemen from the army's main body, ordering Takeda Katsuyori, Obata Masamori, and Saegusa Moritomo to lead a two-pronged cavalry charge into the weakening Tokugawa line. They were closely followed by the footsoldier-heavy main body of the Takeda army, whose combined weight drove the already battered Tokugawa army into a disorderly retreat.

In an effort to reorganize his rapidly dissolving army, Ieyasu ordered his commander Ōkubo Tadayo to plant his golden fan standard (uma-jirushi) upon a hill and rally his troops towards the castle town of Saigadake. Ieyasu then sought to personally re-engage the Takeda army to free his trapped general Mizuno Tadashige, but was persuaded by his retainer Natsume Yoshinobu to retreat.

=== Tokugawa retreat ===
Convinced by his retainers that as head of the Tokugawa clan his life was too important, Ieyasu fled the field. To buy time for the Tokugawa retreat, Natsume Yoshinobu led the few soldiers remaining under his command in a suicide charge against the advancing Takeda, and was killed. Other notable Tokugawa retainers killed in the fighting were Matsudaira Koretada, Naruse Masayoshi, Toyama Kosaku, and Endo Ukon, who all perished as their units were encircled and overrun by the Takeda forces.

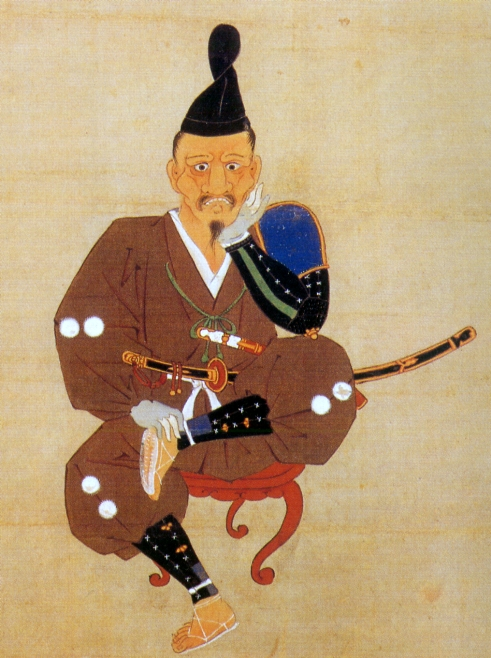
The famous portrait, called the Shikamizō (顰像), depicting Tokugawa Ieyasu after his defeat at Mikatagahara

When Ieyasu returned to Hamamatsu Castle, he was accompanied by only five men. The town was on the verge of panic as rumor had already reached Hamamatsu that the battle had gone badly.

Nevertheless, Ieyasu commanded that the castle gates remain open and that braziers be lit to guide his retreating army back to safety. Sakai Tadatsugu beat a large war drum, seeking to persuade the returning men of their courageous retreat. When the Takeda vanguard led by Baba Nobuharu and Yamagata Masakage heard the drums and saw the braziers and open gates, they mistakenly assumed that Ieyasu had planned a trap and stopped to make camp for the night at their present position short of Hamamatsu.

=== Tokugawa counterattack ===
In the night, a small band of about one hundred Tokugawa foot soldiers and 16 matchlock gunners led by Ōkubo Tadayo and Amano Yasukage attacked the Takeda camp, throwing the vanguard of the Takeda army into confusion. Uncertain of the remaining strength of the Tokugawa forces, and worried that reinforcements from Oda Nobunaga or Uesugi Kenshin were on their way, Takeda Shingen decided to withdraw his forces back to his own territories. This skirmish occurred near Saigagake, a narrow gorge some ten meters deep and 450 meters long, about one kilometer north of Hamamatsu Castle. Known in Japanese sources as the "Battle of Saigagake", the Tokugawa used tactics such as stretching a cloth across the cliff to make it look like a bridge, causing the Takeda forces to suffer numerous casualties when they attempted to flee across this fake bridge. However, this account appears as an anecdote in later records compiled by the Tokugawa shogunate and not in contemporary historical records. Nevertheless, the site of the alleged ruse was designed a Shizuoka Prefecture Historic Site in 1952.

According to the Kansei Chōshū Shokafu, the famous Iga ninja Hattori Hanzō rendered meritorious service during the Battle of Mikatagahara. The genealogy of major samurai complied by the later Tokugawa shogunate records that Hanzo captured a Takeda spy named "Chikuan" and delayed the advancing Takeda at the Tenryū River with an asymmetrical counterattack of only thirty men.

== Aftermath ==
The Battle of Mikatagahara was one of the most famous battles of Takeda Shingen's campaigns and one of the most notable demonstrations of cavalry tactics of the Sengoku period. The battle was also Tokugawa Ieyasu's most decisive defeat, featuring the effective annihilation of Ieyasu's army and the daimyo himself only narrowly escaping death through a bluff and perilous night attack. According to the Japanese calendar, the battle was fought on the 22nd day of the 12th month of the 3rd year of Genki.

For Shingen, there would be no following attack on Hamamatsu as he would be fatally wounded in February 1573 at the Siege of Noda Castle and die in May 1573.
