= Atobe Katsusuke =

Japanese samurai

Samurai General Atobe Katsusuke
- 跡部勝資
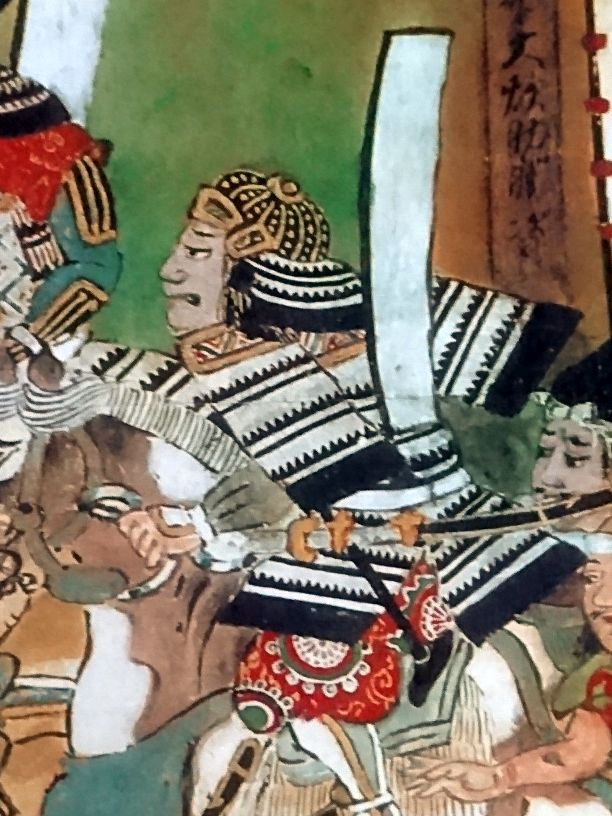

Personal details
- Born: 2nd year of Kyoroku (January 1, 1529)
- Died: 10th year of Tenshō (April 3, 1582)

Atobe Katsusuke (跡部 勝資, 1529 – April 3, 1582) was a Japanese samurai of the Sengoku period, who served the Takeda clan.

Due to the expansion of the Kai Takeda clan's daimyo territory during the rule of Takeda Shingen and Takeda Katsuyori's periods, the head of the family had fewer permanent vassals and children of the Fudai retainers who served as close aides to the family chief. As a result, Katsusuke was able to join the entourage of Shingen and was regarded as one of the most important Shuinjo devotees, along with Hara Masatane and others.

During the Katsuyori family's era, he had a great deal of influence, taking on the role of public prosecutor. Furthermore, according to Koyo Gunkan (甲陽軍鑑), Katsushi was said to be a general who held 300 cavalry and was one of the largest mobilizing forces of the Takeda clan.

Atobe Katsusuke battled in the Battle of Nagashino where the Takeda Army was defeated. It is stated in Koyo Gunkan that he committed suicide along with Takeda Katsuyori on March 11, 1582, during the invasion of Kai by the combined forces of Nobunaga Oda and Ieyasu Tokugawa.
