= Yamagata Masakage =

Japanese samurai (1524-1575)

- 山県 昌景
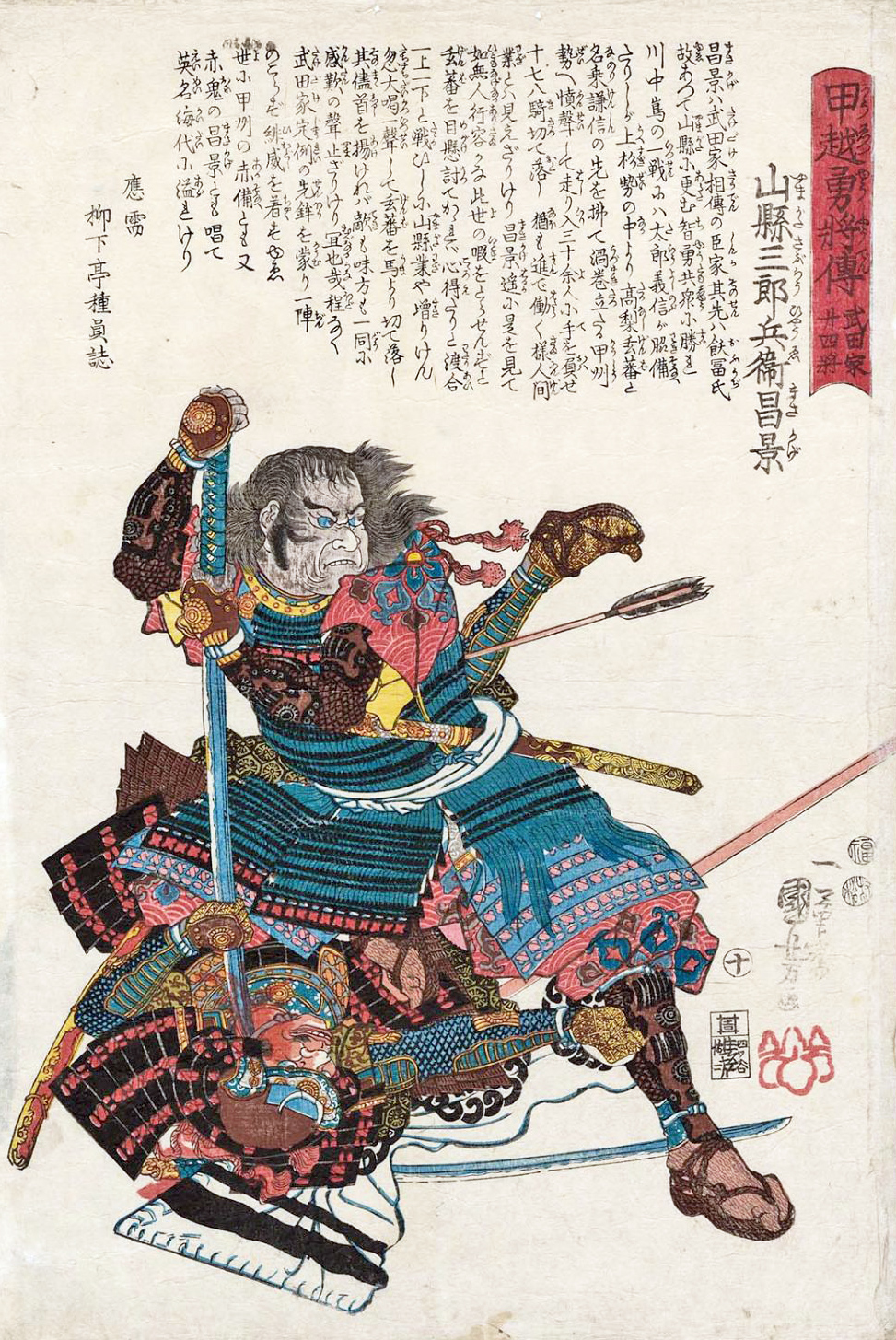
- Born: Obu Masakage; 1524
- Died: June 29, 1575 (aged 50–51)
- Relatives: Obu Toramasa
- Military career
- Allegiance: Takeda clan
- Known for: One of the main characters in Akira Kurosawa's epic film Kagemusha
- Conflicts: Siege of Odawara (1569); Battle of Mimasetoge (1569); Battle of Mikatagahara (1573); Siege of Yoshida Castle (1575); Battle of Nagashino (1575)

Yamagata Masakage (山県 昌景; 1524 – June 29, 1575) also known as Obu Masakage was a Japanese samurai warrior of the Sengoku period. He is known as one of the "Twenty-Four Generals of Takeda Shingen". He was famous for his red armour and skill in battle, and was a personal friend of Takeda Shingen. He was the younger brother of Obu Toramasa, who was also a retainer of Shingen, leading the famous "red fire unit" (derived from Shingen's slogan Fūrinkazan).

== Military legacy ==
Masakage was a fierce warrior who fought in many battles and was given a fief in Shinano. He was present at the Battle of Mimasetoge in 1569 and captured Yoshida Castle, a Tokugawa possession, during the Mikatagahara Campaign (1572–73).

He was present for the following Battle of Mikatagahara. His last campaign was in the ill-fated Battle of Nagashino in 1575, in which he tried to persuade Katsuyori to honorably withdraw.

Ii Naomasa of the Tokugawa clan gained the surviving retainers of the Takeda clan and more widely implemented the ideas of "Masakage's red-colored army," having several units of elite samurai in blood-red armor, to inflict fear and demoralization on enemy troops.

== Personal life ==
After his brother Obu Masatora committed seppuku as a cover for Takeda Yoshinobu's failed rebellion, Masakage changed his family name to Yamagata (he used the name Obu Masakage at first).

== In popular culture ==
Yamagata is one of the main characters in Akira Kurosawa's epic film Kagemusha.
