= Mount Gokurakuji =

Mount in Japan

Highest point
- Elevation: 661 metres
- Coordinates: 34°23′13″N 132°19′04″E

Naming
- Native name: 極楽寺山 (Japanese)

Geography
- Location: Hatsukaichi, Hiroshima Prefecture, Japan

Mount Gokurakuji, at 661 metres (2,169 ft) elevation, stands near the city of Hatsukaichi, Hiroshima Prefecture, Japan, and belongs to the Shingon Buddhist sect. The area includes a natural fir forest where wild bird songs can be heard. The forest has been designated and preserved as a citizen's forest.
