= Otazu no kata =

Japanese Samurai woman

Otazu no kata お田鶴の方
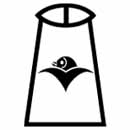

Castellan of Hikuma castle (De facto Iio clan head)
- In office 1565–1568
- Preceded by: Iio Tsuratatsu

Personal details
- Born: Probably 1550
- Died: December 1568
- Spouse: Iio Tsuratatsu
- Relatives: Jukei-ni (Grandmother); Imagawa Ujichika (Grandfather); Imagawa Yoshimoto (Uncle); Imagawa Ujizane (cousin)

Military service
- Allegiance: Imagawa clan
- Unit: Iio clan
- Battles/wars: Siege of Hikuma castle

Otazu no kata (お田鶴の方, d. December 1568), Otatsu no kata or Iio Tazu, was a late-Sengoku period onna-musha. She was the wife of Iio Tsuratatsu and retainer of Imagawa clan. When the Imagawa fell into disarray after their defeat at Battle of Okehazama, she turned against them and became leader of the Iio clan after Tsuratatsu's death.

== Life ==
Otazu no kata born in Mikawa Province, her date of birth is unknown, but there are theories that she was born in 1550. Her father was a vassal of Imagawa and her mother was relative of the Imagawa family, her maternal grandmother was Jukei-ni and her grandfather was Imagawa Ujichika. She lived at Kaminogō castle commanded by her father. She probably married very young to Iio Tsuratatsu and was present in the military affairs of the Iio clan.

Tsuratatsu's father, Iio Noritsura, died at the battle of Okehazama in 1560 and Tsuratatsu succeeded him as lord of Hikuma castle. The results of Okehazama had left the lords of Totomi Province in a chaotic state with Imagawa Yoshimoto's death. In 1562, Ii Naochika was charged with treason and killed on the orders of Imagawa Ujizane. In 1563, Ii Naohira was ordered by the Imagawa clan to attack Iio Tsuratatsu at Hikuma Castle to prove their loyalty to Imagawa. Otazu no Kata learned of the tension between Imagawa-Ii-Iio and invited Naohira to a meeting with her husband and planned to eradicate it to claim prominence in Totomi. In September 18, Otazu no Kata then poisoned Naohira's tea and he died soon after. His death provoked the wrath of the Imagawa clan and Tsuratatsu was condemned to commit seppuku.

In 1564 Niino Chikanori, a retainer of Ii clan, led a siege to Hikuma castle, Otazu fought to defend the castle and Chikanori was killed. Otazu was known for her fiery temper, craftiness, and strictness. She stood by her husband's side when he was accused of treason in the months that followed. Her orders matched the caliber of a general samurai and her anger with disobedience was well known. In the same year, the Imagawa discovered that Iio clan was secretly communicating with Tokugawa Ieyasu and attacked him. Peace was made, but in 1565 he was summoned by Ujizane to Suruga, where he was assassinated.

After Tsuratatsu's death, Otazu was ordered out of the castle, but she remained defiant against orders to leave the Hikuma castle and became the female lord of Iio clan. She was outraged that her gender had considered her weak in the political field, so she strengthened the castle's defenses and sent an appeal to defect to the Takeda clan.

=== Siege of Hikuma castle ===
In December 1568, Tokugawa Ieyasu laid siege to Hikuma Castle, it is said that Ii Naotora (great-granddaughter of Ii Naohira) actively participated in the siege to take revenge, but this is probably a tale of the Edo period. Otazu commanded more than 300 soldiers and a number of people for the defense. Ieyasu's messengers passed the appeal for a peaceful surrender and a promise for the women and children's safety. Otazu rejected him by saying:

Women we may have, and they are born samurai. None who live here would dare submit their home to their enemy.

On the first day of the siege, Sakai Tadatsugu and Ishikawa Kazumasa lost against the Otazu's army. Ieyasu army attacked again, with over 300 people, the castle was defended. Ieyasu attacked again the castle, but the castle soldiers prevented it, and they were hit by severe guns. Ieyasu's soldiers killed 300 people and the castle soldiers slaughtered more than 200, but Ieyasu's army was a large army and did not collapse. On the last day of the siege, Otatsu opened the gate and donned armor and fought with a naginata while she was accompanied by 18 armed women. She fought in the front gate and lost her life in battle. For her heroic deed as a samurai woman, Ieyasu said of her in her memory:

There is no man alive who could have protected their beliefs so rigidly like you did.

According to Edo folklore, Otazu no kata became posthumously associated with the name Tsubakihime (椿姫, "Camellia Maiden"), because her grave and those of her maids blossomed with Japanese camellias. Lady Tsukiyama, Ieyasu's wife, was said to have looked after them and marveled that no other camellias could match their radiance.

== See also ==
- List of female castellans in Japan
