= Sakai Tadatsugu =

Samurai of the Sengoku era; major Daimyo ally of the Tokugawa clan

- 酒井 忠次
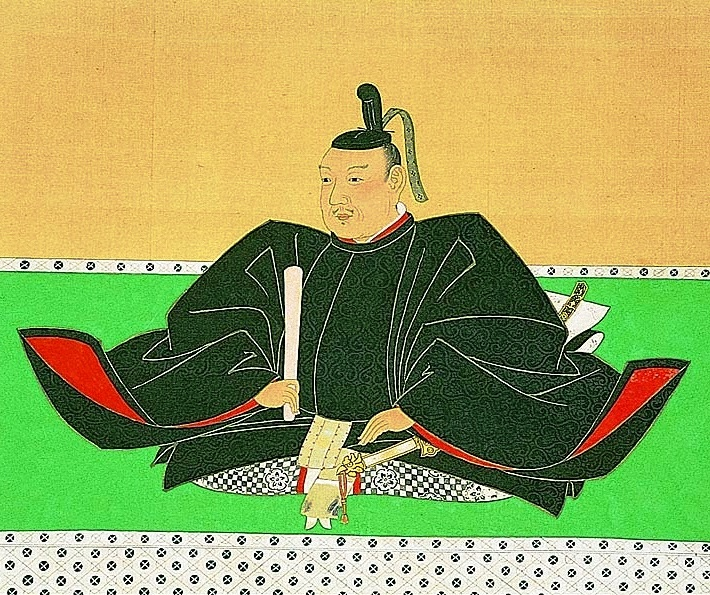

Daimyo of Yoshida castle
- In office 1565–1578
- Succeeded by: Sakai Ietsugu

Personal details
- Born: 1527 Mikawa province
- Died: December 17, 1596 (aged 68–69) Kyoto
- Spouse: Usui
- Relatives: Matsudaira Hirotada father-in-law; Tokugawa Ieyasu nephew-in-law
- Nickname: "Boar Slayer" (Inokiri)

Military service
- Allegiance: Matsudaira clan Imagawa clan Tokugawa clan
- Unit: Sakai clan
- Commands: Yoshida Castle
- Battles/wars: Oda-Imagawa conflict (? - 1560); Siege of Ida castle; Siege of Imahashi castle; Siege of Tawara castle; Siege of Fukutani castle (1556); Siege of Terabe; Siege of Marune; Mikawa Ikkō-ikki uprising (1563 - 1564); Battle of Azukizaka (1564); Siege of Yoshida Castle (1564); Siege of Kakegawa (1569); Battle of Anegawa (1570); Campaign against Takeda clan (1576-1581); Battle of Mikatagahara; Siege of Yoshida Castle; Battle of Nagashino; Journey in Iga (1582); Tenshō-Jingo war (1582); Shinano Province invasion; Battle of Wakamiko; Battle of Komaki and Nagakute (1584-1586); Siege of Shimojima castle; Siege of Kanie Castle

Sakai Tadatsugu (酒井 忠次; 1527 – 17 December 1596) was a Sengoku and Azuchi–Momoyama period samurai and high-ranking general who served under Tokugawa Ieyasu.

His official title was Sakai Saemon-no-jo Tadatsugu.

Tadatsugu was allegedly involved in the conspiracy that caused the death of Lady Tsukiyama and her son, Matsudaira Nobuyasu.

In later periods, Tadatsugu was hailed as one of the Sixteen Divine Generals and Four Heavenly Kings of the Tokugawa clan.

== Biography ==
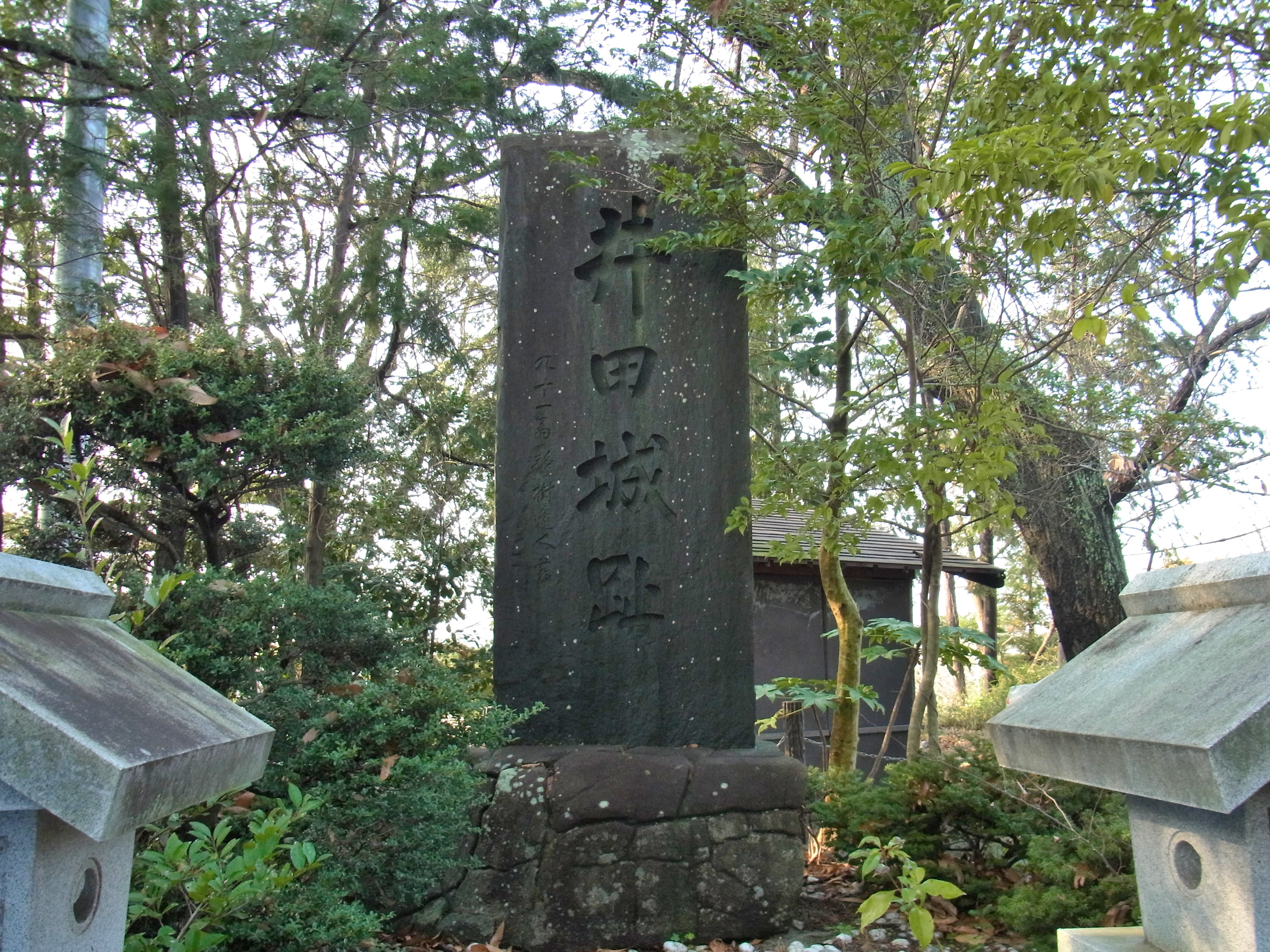
Ida castle ruin, birthplace of Sakai Tadatsugu

Tadatsugu was born in 1527 in Ido castle, Mikawa Province, to Sakai Tadachika. The Sakai clan were hereditary vassals to the Matsudaira clan. He served as vassal to Matsudaira Hirotada and later his son, Matsudaira Takechiyo (later known as Tokugawa Ieyasu).

He became one of the most trusted of Ieyasu's vassals in most military and political affairs of the Tokugawa clan. He was described by Oda Nobunaga as Ieyasu's right-hand man.

In 1563, Tadatsugu married princess Usui, granddaughter of Matsudaira Hirotada and Ieyasu's sister.

=== Early military service ===
Under Imagawa Yoshimoto's orders, Tadatsugu attacked Tada Yasumitsu, uncle-in-law of Matsudaira Hirotada. Tadatsugu seized the castles in Yasumitsu's possession at Imahashi and Tawara.

During Oda Nobuhide's siege of Ida castle, Tadatsugu and Naitō Nobunari sallied out and fought Nobuhide's army.

In 1551, after Hirotada's death, Tadatsugu served young Ieyasu. He was one of the vassals who joined Ieyasu when he became a hostage in Sunpu.

In 1556, according to records in the Tosho Gunkan, Tadatsugu defended Fukutani castle, which was besieged by 2,000 cavalry troops of the Oda clan led by Shibata Katsuie. Tadatsugu repelled the invaders by leading a sallying force outside the castle to engage Katsuie's troops. During the battle, Watanabe Yoshitsuna, maternal grandfather of Watanabe Moritsuna, fought under the command of Tadatsugu and killed Katsuie's general Hayakawa Tōta with a bow.

In 1558, Tadatsugu accompanied Ieyasu in the Siege of Terabe.

In 1560 at the Siege of Marune, Tadatsugu served as a vanguard of Tokugawa forces along with Ishikawa Ienari. After the battle, he defeated Sakuma Morishige, an Oda general who was defending the fort. Tokugawa's forces killed Morishige with arquebus shots.

In 1563, during the Ikkō-ikki uprising in Mikawa, Tadatsugu followed Ieyasu, while his brother, Sakai Tadanao, supported the Ikkō-ikki. (Note: Sengoku period historians argue that Tadanao was not actually an Ikkō-ikki sympathizer, but more likely sided with the Oda clan, which at that time was the enemy of Imagawa clan.) The uprising had four epicenters where the Ikkō-shū fortified their temples. Tadatsugu was tasked with pacifying one of the garrisoned temples, located in Ida village.

In 1564, Tadatsugu led an attack towards Yoshida Castle. Shizumi Obara, lord of the castle, surrendered the castle and escaped. In the same year, before the Battle of Azukizaka, Tadatsugu wrote a letter to the Ikko-Ikki faction in Mikawa, chastising their rebellious conduct.

=== Service in the Oda-Tokugawa alliance ===
Sometime around 1565, Tadatsugu urged his superior, Ieyasu, to abandon his allegiance to the Imagawa clan. After the Tokugawa clan captured Yoshida Castle in eastern Mikawa (present-day Toyohashi), Ieyasu ordered Tadatsugu to control the castle. Ieyasu assigned Tadatsugu, Ishikawa Kazumasa, Sakakibara Yasumasa, and Honda Tadakatsu as chiefs of the Tokugawa council of staff.

By 1567, Ieyasu restructured his army into two divisions, each with a separate commander. Tadatsugu was given command of 18 Tokugawa Fudai and Kamon daimyōs, while Ishikawa Kazumasa was given command over the forces of 13 daimyō. Tadatsugu was given command of the "Higashi-Mikawa" ("Eastern Mikawa") samurai clans, such as Matsudaira Ietada (Fukōzu), Matsudaira Tadamasa, Matsudaira Ietada (Katahara), and others.

In 1569, Tadatsugu participated in the Siege of Kakegawa castle.

In 1570, Tadatsugu was involved in the Battle of Anegawa, leading the Tokugawa forces that formed the left wing of the Oda-Tokugawa alliance forces. Tadatsugu and Ishikawa Kazumasa led the vanguard, while Sakakibara Yasumasa and Honda Tadakatsu led the rearguard of the Tokugawa formation.

In 1572, during the Battle of Mikatagahara, Tadatsugu fought the opposing Takeda clan forces on the far-right position of the Tokugawa forces' stork-shaped formation. At first, Tadatsugu repulsed the first wave of the Takeda charge led by Oyamada Nobushige. The second wave, led by Baba Nobuharu, led to Tadatsugu's forces being overwhelmed and his troops were badly beaten. As Ieyasu and his allies retreated to Hamamatsu Castle, Tadatsugu participated in the ruse which mitigated the effects of Takeda victory in the field, and the Takeda forces withdrew.

In June 1574, the Takeda clan began sieging Takatenjin. Oda Nobunaga lead the reinforcements to encamp at Yoshida castle, where he was greeted by Tadatsugu. Learning that Takatenjin had surrendered, Nobunaga remained at Yoshida castle to plan.

In 1575, when Takeda Katsuyori laid siege to Yoshida castle, Tadatsugu defended with a garrison of 6,000 soldiers. The battles were exclusively limited to spear skirmishes outside the wall, which frustrated Katsuyori, causing him to abandon the siege.

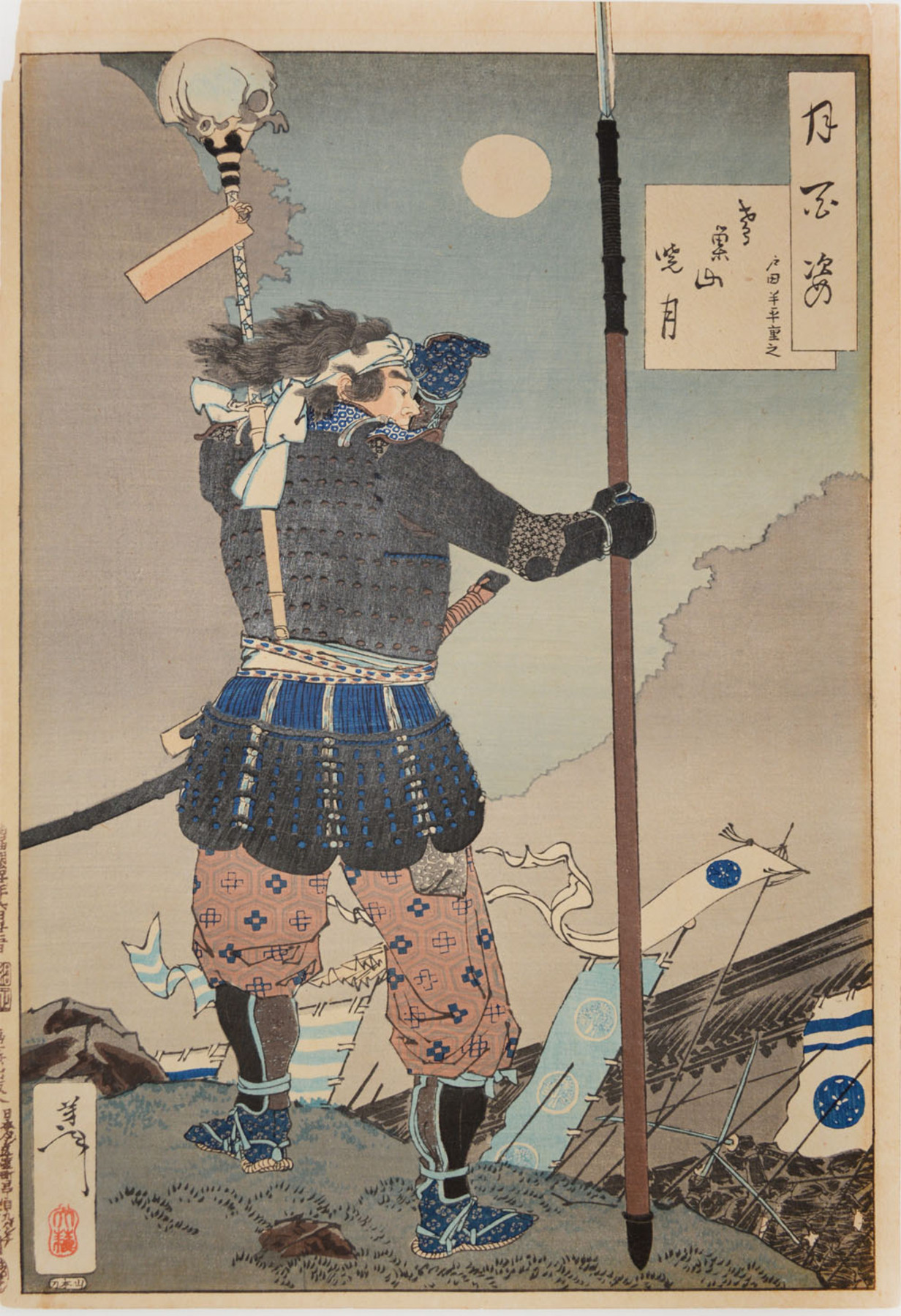
depiction of Sakai Tadatsugu with skull head as standard on his back, at the attack of Nagashino, 1575, work by Tsukioka Yoshitoshi.

Later that year, during the war council discussion before the Battle of Nagashino, Tadatsugu suggested a night raid, which was quickly rejected by Nobunaga. This later proved to be a deception due to Nobunaga's fears about the information leaking to enemy intelligence, and he agreed to the plan in private after the meeting. Tadatsugu was tasked with leading a night raid against the Takeda forces located in Tobinosuyama with Kanamori Nagachika. They led a flying columnof 2,000 Tokugawa archers and arquebus gunners, supplemented with the Oda clan's regiment of cavalry and 500 arquebus gunners. Tadatsugu led the forces to take the road from Koshu to Horai-ji Temple in Sanshu, then crossed a river, until they reached the camp of the Takeda forces near the besieged Nagashino castle. (Note: citation from Hayashi Razan chronicle.) Tadatsugu successfully ambushed the Takeda forces, which caused the death of two Takeda generals, Takeda Nobuzane and Saegusa Moritomo. After the enemy troops in Nagashino castle were routed, Tadatsugu burned the nearby Kadoya village.

At Tobinosuyama mountain, after the battle of Nagashino at the end of the campaign, Oda Nobunaga personally rewarded Tadatsugu for his defence of a castle with a jinbaori (samurai commander's jacket) and a Maki no Tachi (sword's mounting).

In 1578, Tadatsugu's son, Sakai Ietsugu (1564–1619), took over his father's role as castellan of Yoshida Castle. The prefix ie- in his name was a special honor bestowed by Tokugawa Ieyasu, allowing them to use of one of the kanji from his nanori name.

In 1579, Oda Nobunaga grew suspicious that Ieyasu's wife, Lady Tsukiyama, was developing a plan to betray the Oda clan. He approached Tadatsugu who confirmed his suspicions. Due to Tadatsugu's rank and trusted position, Nobunaga believed this. This resulted in Lady Tsukiyama's execution, and her and Ieyasu's son, Matsudaira Nobuyasu, being forced to commit seppuku. Tadatsugu's actions may have been a conspiracy with Odai no Kata. Arthur Lindsay Sadlertheorized that this was a deliberate act of spite from Tadatsugu due to his dislike of Nobuyasu.

=== After Nobunaga's death ===
In 1582, after the Honnō-ji Incident, Tadatsugu accompanied Ieyasu in crossing Iga province and returning to Mikawa to escape the enemies of Nobunaga in Sakai. However, their journey was very dangerous due to the existence of "ochimusha-gari" groups across the route. (Note: According to Imatani Akira, a professor of Tsuru University, and Ishikawa Tadashi, an assistant professor at the University of Central Florida, during the Sengoku period there is an emergence of particularly dangerous groups called "ochimusha-gari" or "fallen warrior hunt" groups. These groups were decentralized peasant or Rōnin self-defense forces which operated outside the law, while in actuality they usually hunted samurai or soldiers who has been defeated in wars.) During the journey, Tadatsugu and Ieyasu's other senior retainers fought through raids and harassment from the ochimusha-gari while escorting Ieyasu, paying bribes of gold and silver where possible. The attacks ceased when they reached Kada (an area between Kameyama town and Iga), the territory of Kōka ikki samurai friendly to the Tokugawa clan. The Kōka ikki samurai escorted them to Iga Province. There, where the samurai clans of Iga ikki took over the escort, accompanying the Ieyasu group until they reached Mikawa. According to the records in the Ietada nikki journal, Ieyasu's escorts suffered around 200 casualties, and only 34 people arrived at Ietada's residence in Mikawa.

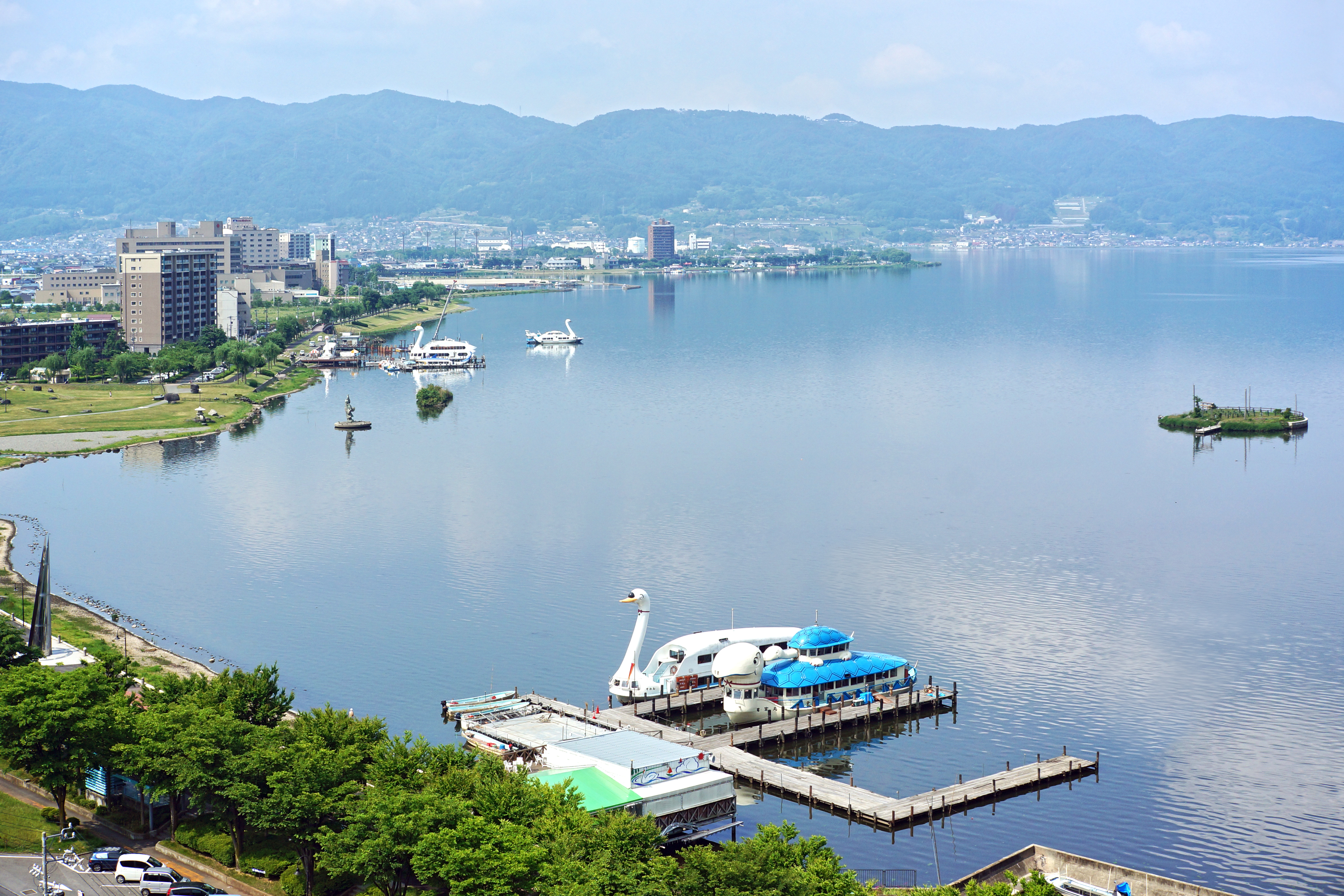
Lake Suwa, Suwa city Nagano Prefecture.

Between June and October of the same year, the Tenshō-Jingo War started between the Tokugawa, Hōjō, and Uesugi clans over control of Kai Province (currently Gunma Prefecture), Shinano Province (currently Nagano Prefecture), and the Ueno region, vacant since the destruction of Takeda clan and the death of Oda Nobunaga. After Ieyasu returned to Mikawa, he led an army of 8,000 soldiers into Kai, Shinano, and Ueno, in order to annex it. However, an army of 55,000 men under the Hōjō clan crossed the Usui Pass to invade Shinano. Ieyasu dispatched Tadatsugu and Ogasawara Nobumine with a detachment to pacify Shinano, while Ieyasu took the main army to pacify Kai. Tadatsugu and Nobumine met with unexpected resistance from Suwa Yoritada, a former Takeda vassal now allied with the Hōjō clan. They were defeated by Moritada, and Tadatsugu's army was almost surrounded. Tadatsugu led a desperate breakthrough through enemy lines and retreated into Wakamiko, Kai province, where he joined Ieyasu's main forces.

In Wakamiko, the confrontation lasted for 80 days without a clear result. During this period, Ieyasu acquired more than 800 former vassals of the Takeda clan from Kai. In December, Tadatsugu led the army once again to subdue Suwa Yoritada at Suwa, Shinano. This succeeded, and Yoritada surrendered to the Tokugawa clan.

=== Battle of Komaki-Nagakute ===
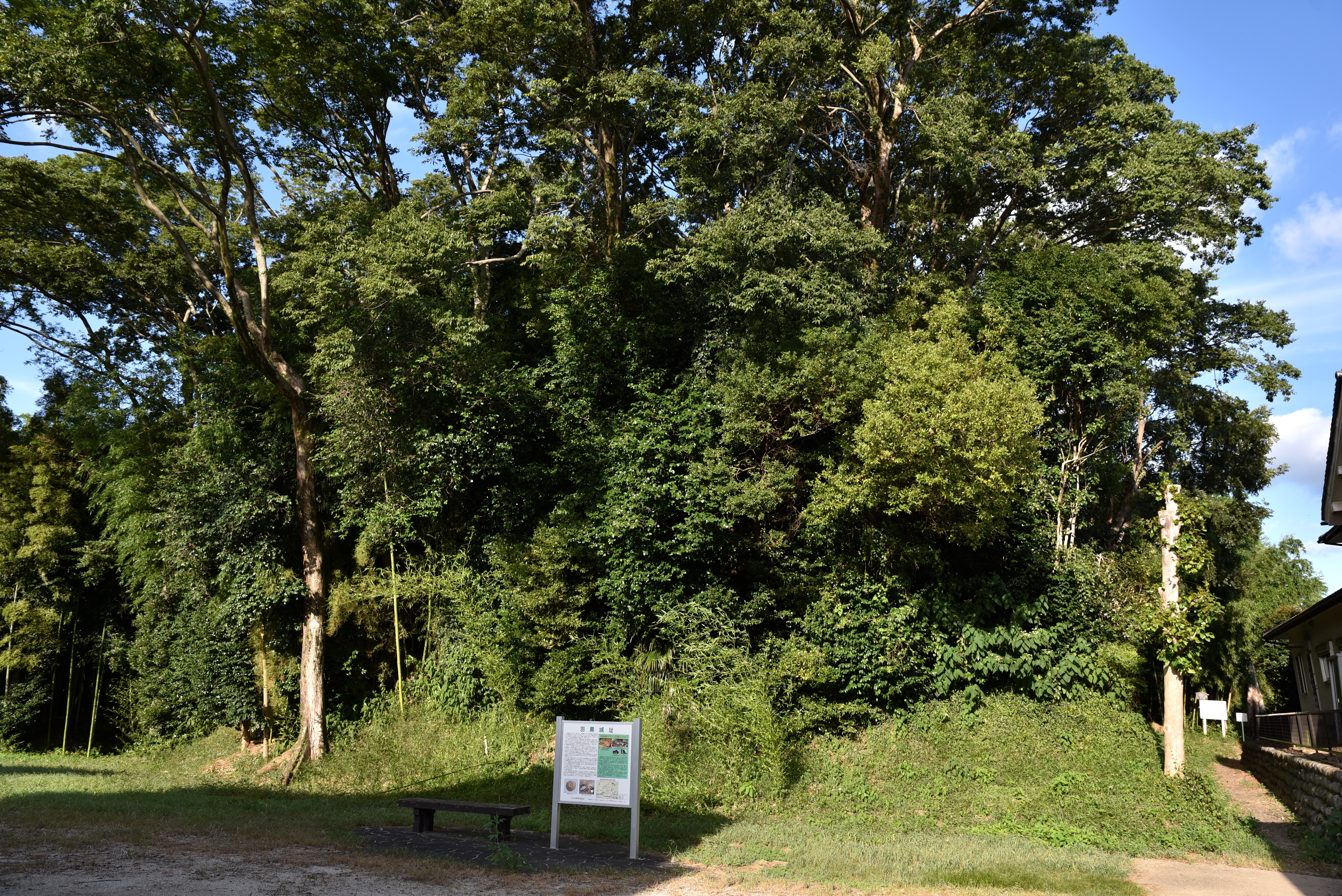
Haguro, place where Sakai Tadatsugu clashed with Nagayoshi

In 1584, during the Komaki-Nagakute campaign, Tadatsugu successfully turned back a move by Toyotomi Hideyoshi's forces against Kiyosu Castle, which was led by Hideyoshi's commander Mori Nagayoshi. Tadatsugu scouted Nagayoshi's forces during their march, and as Nagayoshi rested and camped his soldiers in the Hachimanbayashi area of Haguro. Tadatsugu joined Okudaira Nobumasa and Matsudaira Ietada (Fukōzu) in Komaki to launch an attack at dawn. As they pushed Nagayoshi's forces, Tadatsugu tried to encircle them from the flank, killing 300 of Nagayoshi's soldiers. However, they ultimately failed to entrap Nagayoshi as he managed to break through the encirclement and retreat. Following this, Tadatsugu returned to Komaki where he, Honda Tadakatsu, and Ishikawa Kazumasa stationed their troops.

After the battle of Nagakute in April, the front line in northern Owari reached a stalemate. At this time, Kanie Castle was located about three miles between Ieyasu's Kiyosu Castle and Nobuo's Nagashima Castle, and was connected to the Mie moat and three castles: Ono Castle, Shimojima Castle, and Maeda Castle. Kanie castle faced the sea and was one of the leading ports in Owari, along with Atsuta and Tsushima. On June 18, Ieyasu and Nobuo led 20,000 soldiers and besieged Kanie, Maeda, and Shimojima. Kanie castle was defended by Maeda Nagatane and Takigawa Kazumasu. Tadatsugu, Okanabe Mori, and Yamaguchi Shigemasa spearheaded the attack of Shimojima castle, while Sakakibara Yasumasa, Osuga Yasutaka were deployed to capture any fleeing defenders. During this siege, Ieyasu's Hatamoto retainers, including Mizuno Katsunari, blockaded the port of the castle, and hijacked two ships belongs to Kuki Yoshitaka, to prevent any outside help for Kanie castle. After the fall of Shimojima castle, on June 22, Oda Nobuo and Tokugawa Ieyasu launched an all-out attack on Kanie Castle. The soldiers led by Tadatsugu, who had been deployed at the main entrance, were exhausted after days of fierce fighting, and in the evening, the soldiers of Sakakibara Yasumasa and Matsudaira Ietada entered Kaimonjiguchi. On June 23, Ieyasu entered the castle with Sakakibara Yasumasa, and the castles were subdued.

In 1586, according to the Sakakibara clan's historical records, Ieyasu sent Honda Tadakatsu, Sakakibara Yasumasu, and Ii Naomasa as representatives to Kyoto, with the three of them being regarded as the "Tokugawa Sanketsu" ("three great nobles of Tokugawa"). In the following month, the three of them were joined by Tadatsugu Sakai to accompany Ieyasu in his personal trip to Kyoto, where the four of them "became famous".

=== Retirement and death ===
In 1590, during the Odawara Campaign, Tadatsugu was ordered to accompany Tokugawa Hidetada, Ieyasu's son and heir, to Kyoto, where he served as a hostage for Ieyasu's loyalty to the Toyotomi clan during that campaign. After the battle, Hideyoshi ordered the Tokugawa clan to relocate from their ancestral holdings to the Kantō region. Tadatsugu went into retirement, but his son Ietsugu received a 30,000 koku fudai fief at Usui, in Shimōsa Province, and Tadasugu accompanied him there.

Tadatsugu died in Kyoto in the winter of 1596. After Tadatsugu's death, the Sakai clan continued to prosper.

== Lineage ==
=== Sakai clan genealogy ===
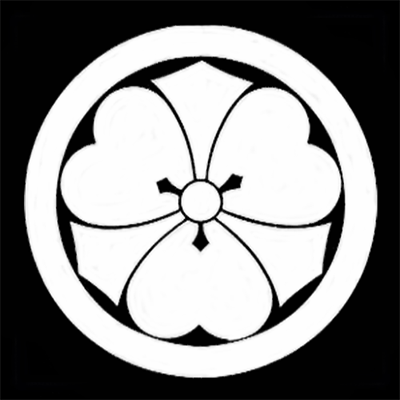
Emblem (mon) of the Sakai clan

The Sakai clan originated in the 14th century in Mikawa Province, claiming descent from Minamoto Arichika. Arichika had two sons: one of them, Yasuchika, took the name Matsudaira; and the younger, Chikauji, took the name Sakai.

Sakai Hirochika, who was the son of Chikauji, likewise had two sons, and their descendants gave rise to the two main branches of the Sakai clan. Tadatsugu was the heir of the senior branch of the clan.

In 1604, his descendants moved to Takasaki Domain (50,000 koku) in Kōzuke Province; in 1616, they relocated to Takata Domain (100,000 koku) in Echigo Province; in 1619, they were transferred to Matsushiro Domain in Shinano Province; and then, from 1622 to 1868, they were installed at Tsurugaoka Domain (120,000 koku) in Dewa Province. The head of the Sakai clan was ennobled as a "Count" in the Meiji period.

== Arms and weapons ==
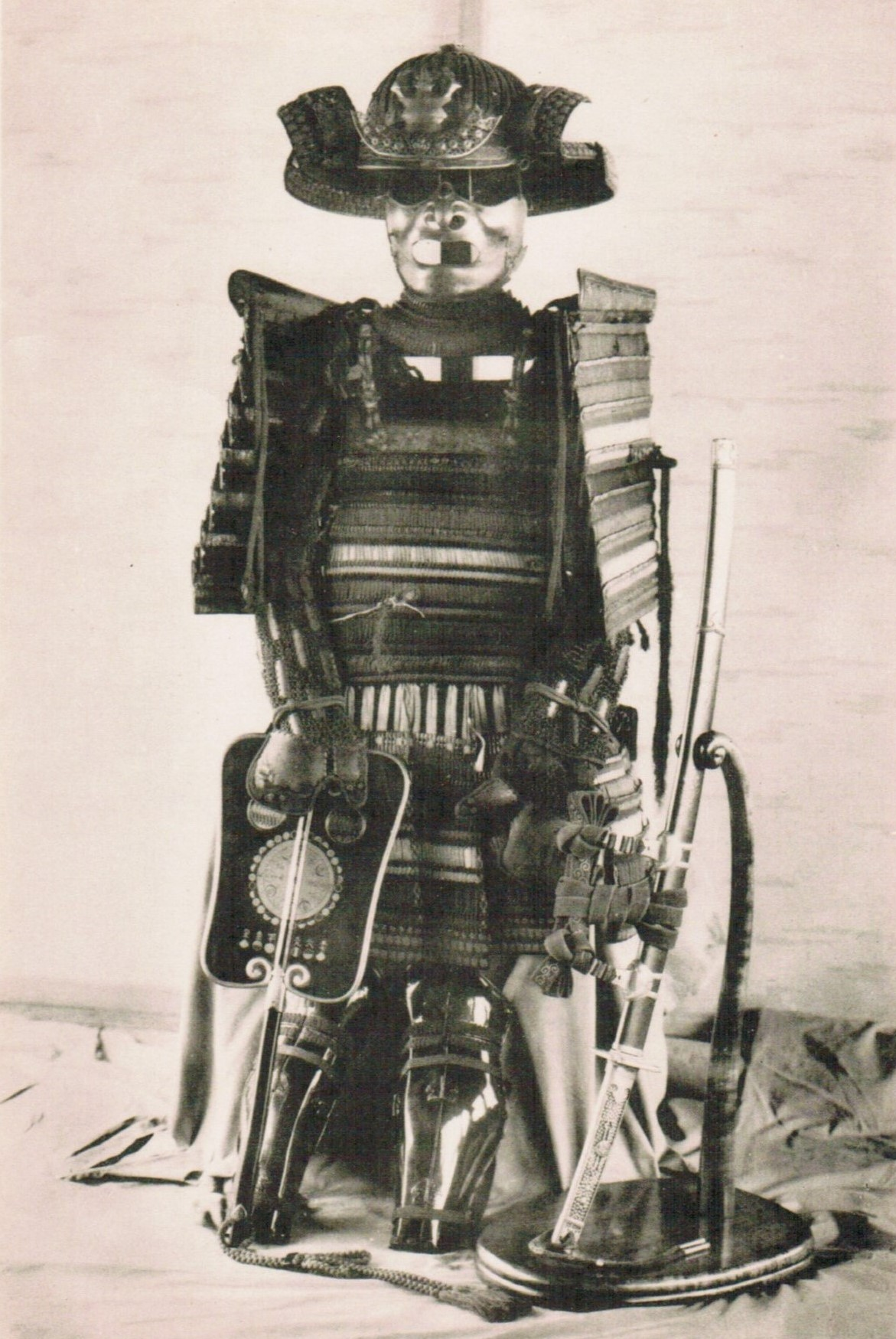
Iroiro Dō-maru, Sakai Tadatsugu first set of armor. Tsuruoka City, Yamagata Prefecture, Chido Museum Collection.

Sakai Tadatsugu owned at least three sets of Japanese armor:

1. The first set was black and yellow laced infantry armor with a Kamakura period style called Iroiro Dō-maru. It is said this set was mostly for ceremonial purposes.
2. The second set used by Tadatsugu was two pieces of vermilion-lacquered black thread armor which were reportedly for combat use. This set of armor has a Kabuto helmet with golden antler horns, similar to horn motifs owned by Sanada Yukimura or Honda Tadakatsu. This helmet piece is thought to date to as far back as the Azuchi–Momoyama period. In 2017, on commemorating the 140th anniversary of Shonai shrine in Tsuruoka, Chidō Museum officials ordered a replica of this helmet to be made by professional blacksmith from Nagoya city for exhibition.
3. Another set of armor believed to be used by Tadatsugu was a Dō of Sendai region influence which is currently preserved in the Kanagawa Prefecture collection. It has the unusual feature of a ridged shin-guard. It is believed that Tadatsugu used this armor during the battle of Nagashino. Furthermore, this armor type was first popularized by Date Masamune, Daimyo of Sendai.

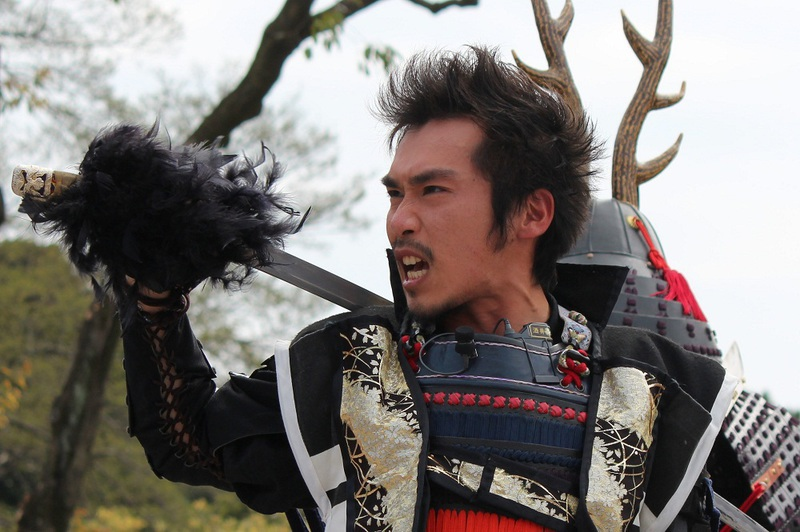
A member of the Nagoya Omotenashi Bushō-tai street performers dressed as Sakai Tadatsugu

Another tool which belonged to Tadatsugu and is preserved in a museum is a Gunbai Uchiwa(軍配団扇) or "signal fan," which was passed down for generations by the Sakai clan.

It is said Tadatsugu killed a boar with his katana in 1560, earning it the name of the Inoshishi-giri or Inokiri (猪切, The Boar Slayer). The blade itself was a work of Masazane from the Tegai school of Nara, and a colleague of the famous Muramasa (or possibly an alias of Muramasa's). Masazane also created Tonbōgiri (蜻蛉切, The Dragonfly Slayer), the most famous of the Three Great Spears of Japan (天下三名槍) and the favorite weapon of Honda Tadakatsu, another one of the Tokugawa Shitennō.

Another sword owned by Tadatsugu was a Tachi which was said to be given to Tadatsugu by Ieyasu. It was passed down through generations by the Sakai clan. There is another Tachi sword possessed by Tadatsugu which was forged by Nagamitsu, pupil of a renowned swordsmith named Sanemitsu. It is said it was given to Tadatsugu by Oda Nobunaga.

Tadatsugu's personal Yari is named Kame toshi no yari (Jar breaking spear), because, according to legend, he once found an enemy hiding behind a huge clay jar, which Tadatsugu pierced with his Yari spear along with the enemy behind it.

== Appendix ==
=== Bibliography ===
- Aichi Prefectural Library (1886). 【伝記・系譜】 改正三河後風土記 [[Biography/Genealogy] Revised Mikawa Go-Fudoki]. 金松堂.
- Appert, Georges and H. Kinoshita. (1888). Ancien Japon. Tokyo: Imprimerie Kokubunsha.
- Arthur Lindsay Sadler (2014). The Maker of Modern Japan The Life of Tokugawa Ieyasu. Taylor & Francis. ISBN 9781136924705.
- Arthur Lindsay Sadler (2009). Turnbull, Stephen (ed.). Shogun: The Life of Tokugawa Ieyasu. Tuttle Publishing. p. 7. ISBN 9781462916542.
- Meyer, Eva-Maria. (1999). Japans Kaiserhof in de Edo-Zeit: Unter besonderer Berücksichtigung der Jahre 1846 bis 1867. Münster: Tagenbuch. ISBN 3-8258-3939-7
- Bryant, Anthony J. (1994). Samurai, 1550–1600. Oxford: Osprey Publishing. ISBN 1-85532-345-1
- Harada Kazutoshi (2009). Art of the Samurai Japanese Arms and Armor, 1156-1868. Metropolitan Museum of Art (New York, N.Y.). ISBN 9781588393456.
- Hirai, Takato (1992), 福山開祖・水野勝成 [Mizuno Katsunari the founder of Fukuyama], 新人物往来社 / Shin Jinbutsu Ōraisha, ISBN 4404019181, OCLC 28019953
- Jansen, Marius B. (1995). Warrior Rule in Japan,. Cambridge: Cambridge University Press. ISBN 0-521-48404-9
- Mikami Sanji (1922). 寛政重修諸家譜』巻第六十五「酒井」 :国民図書版『寛政重修諸家譜 第一輯』 (in Japanese). 國民圖書. p. 355.
- Papinot, Jacques Edmund Joseph. (1906) Dictionnaire d'histoire et de géographie du japon. Tokyo: Librarie Sansaisha...Click link for digitized 1906 Nobiliaire du japon (2003)
- Plutschow, Herbert. (1995). Japan's Name Culture: The Significance of Names in a Religious, Political and Social Context. London: Routledge. ISBN 978-1-873410-42-4 (cloth)
- Shigezane Okaya (1944). 名将言行録 [Record of famous commanders' words]. 岩波文庫. Vol. 6巻. 岩波書店.
- Turnbull, Stephen (1998). The Samurai Sourcebook. Cassell & Co. p. 215. ISBN 1854095234.
- Turnbull, Stephen R. (2000). Nagashino 1575: Slaughter at the Barricades. Oxford: Osprey Publishing. ISBN 1-85532-619-1
- Turnbull, Stephen (2000). The Samurai Sourcebook. London: Cassell & C0. ISBN 1854095234.

=== External source ===
Tomoyo Hazuki. "Tadatsugu Sakai". tabi-samurai-japan. japan travel samurai.
