= Katsumata Castle =

Castle ruins in Makinohara, Shizuoka, Japan

- 勝間田城
- Makinohara, Shizuoka Japan
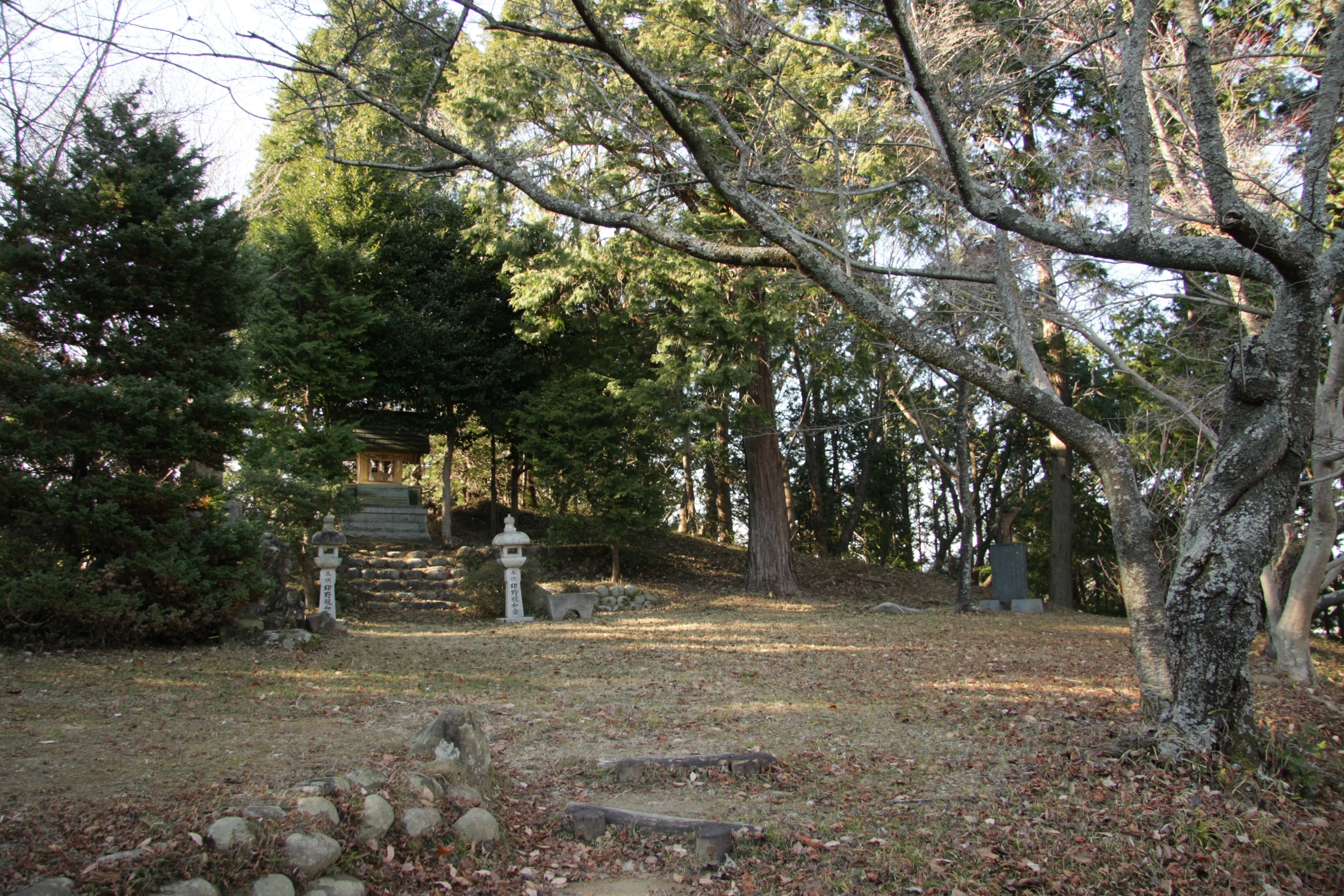
- ruins of Main Bailey of Katsumata Castle

Site information
- Type: Japanese castle
- Controlled by: Katsumata clan
- Open to the public: yes
- Condition: ruins

Location
- Location within Shizuoka Prefecture Location within Japan
- Coordinates: 34°46′42.3″N 138°09′25.4″E

Site history
- Built: 14th century
- Built by: Katsumata clan
- In use: Muromachi period
- Shizuoka Prefectural Historic Site

Katsumata Castle (勝間田城, Katsumata-jō) was a Muromachi period Japanese castle located in the city of Makinohara, Shizuoka Prefecture, Japan. Its ruins have been protected as a Shizuoka Prefectural Historic Site since 2020.

== Overview ==
Katsumata Castle was located on a hill about 130 meters above sea level, in the upper reaches of the Katsumata River, which flows from the Makinohara Plateau into Suruga Bay. It is about five kilometers southeast of the site of Suwahara Castle and five kilometers northeast of the site of Yokoji Castle.

This was the stronghold of the Katsumata clan, the lords of Katsuta-shō shōen since the 10th century, who later served the Kamakura and Muromachi shogunates. Katsumata Shigenaga was a retainer of Minamoto no Yoritomo and fought in the Genpei War. Katsumata Nagakiyo was a noted poet who edited the Fubo Wakasho, a massive anthology of over 17,000 poems. The construction of the castle is uncertain, but is believed to have been in the 14th century. Due to their strategic location controlling the Tōkaidō highway, the Katsumata were direct retainers of the Muromachi shogunate, and supported the western army of Shiba Yoshikado, shugo of Tōtōmi Province in the Ōnin War in 1467. This brought them into conflict the Suruga-based Imagawa clan, which, under Imagawa Yoshitada, invaded and occupied Katsumata Castle in 1476. The castle appears to have remained for a number of decades afterwards as a supply base

Katsumata Castle consisted of several enclosures, spread across the ridges of a hill in a reverse "V" shape, protected on both sides by the slopes of the ridge. The central area of the castle was an oblong enclosure 20 meters in diameter with clay walls, protected by a combination of smaller enclosures and dry moats. The total size of the castle was about 300 meter long and 200 meter wide. No structures of the castle have survived, but the remains of the main enclosure, second enclosure, third enclosure, outwork enclosure, dry moats, trenches, and earthworks are well-preserved.Archaeological excavations have confirmed the existence of building foundations and artifacts. The site has been maintained for visitor access.

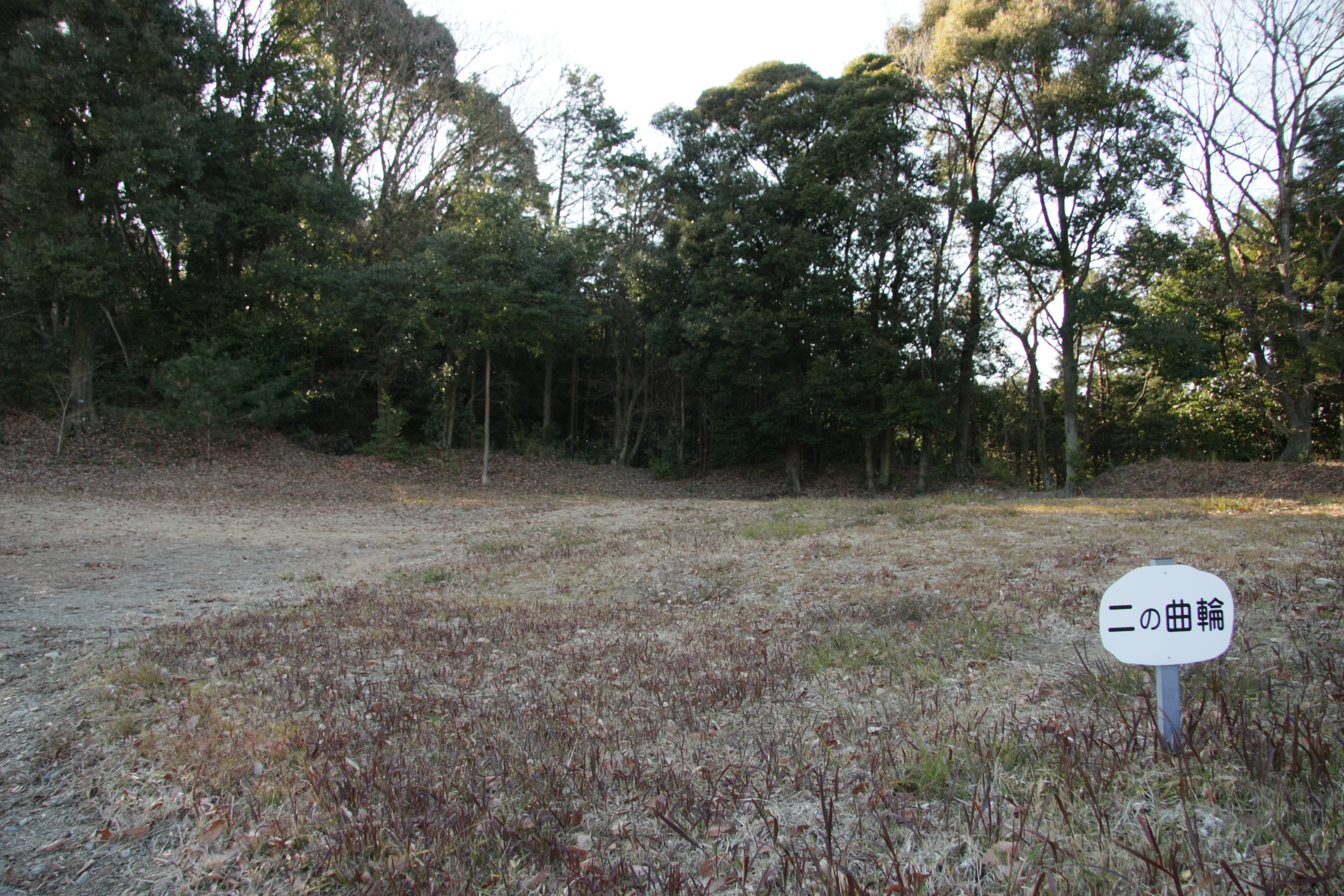
Second Kuruwa

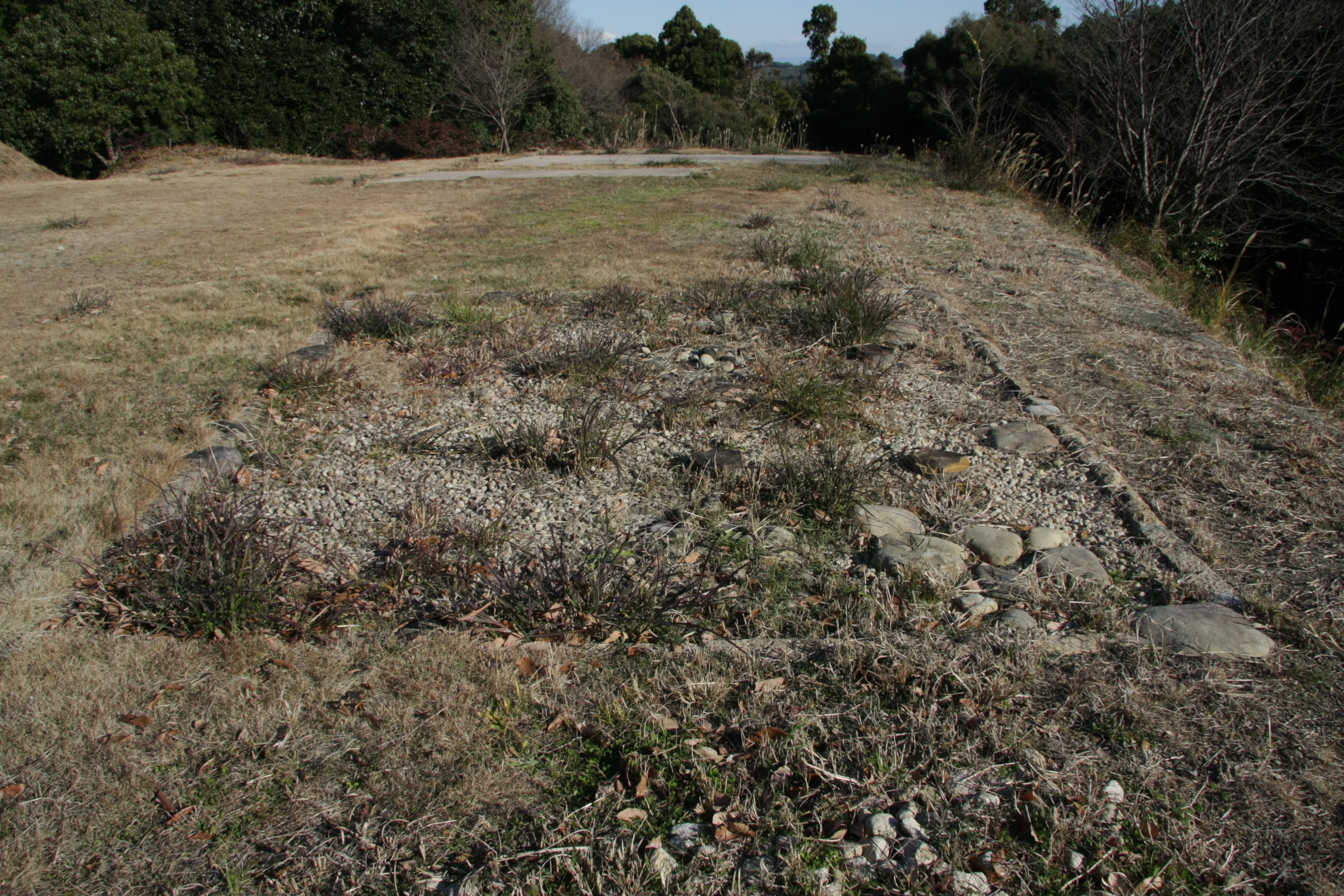
Second Kuruwa with foundation stones

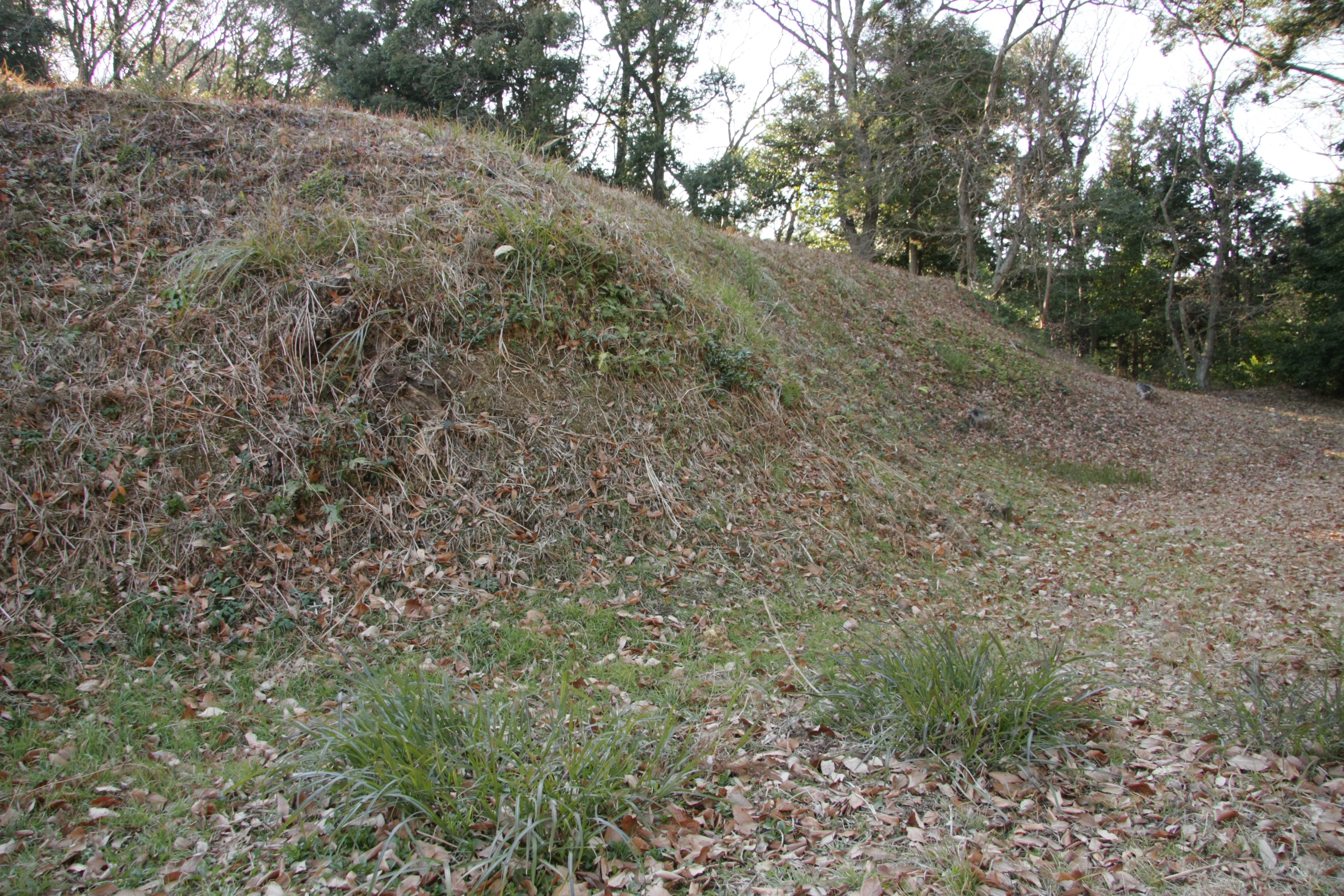
Earthen rampart

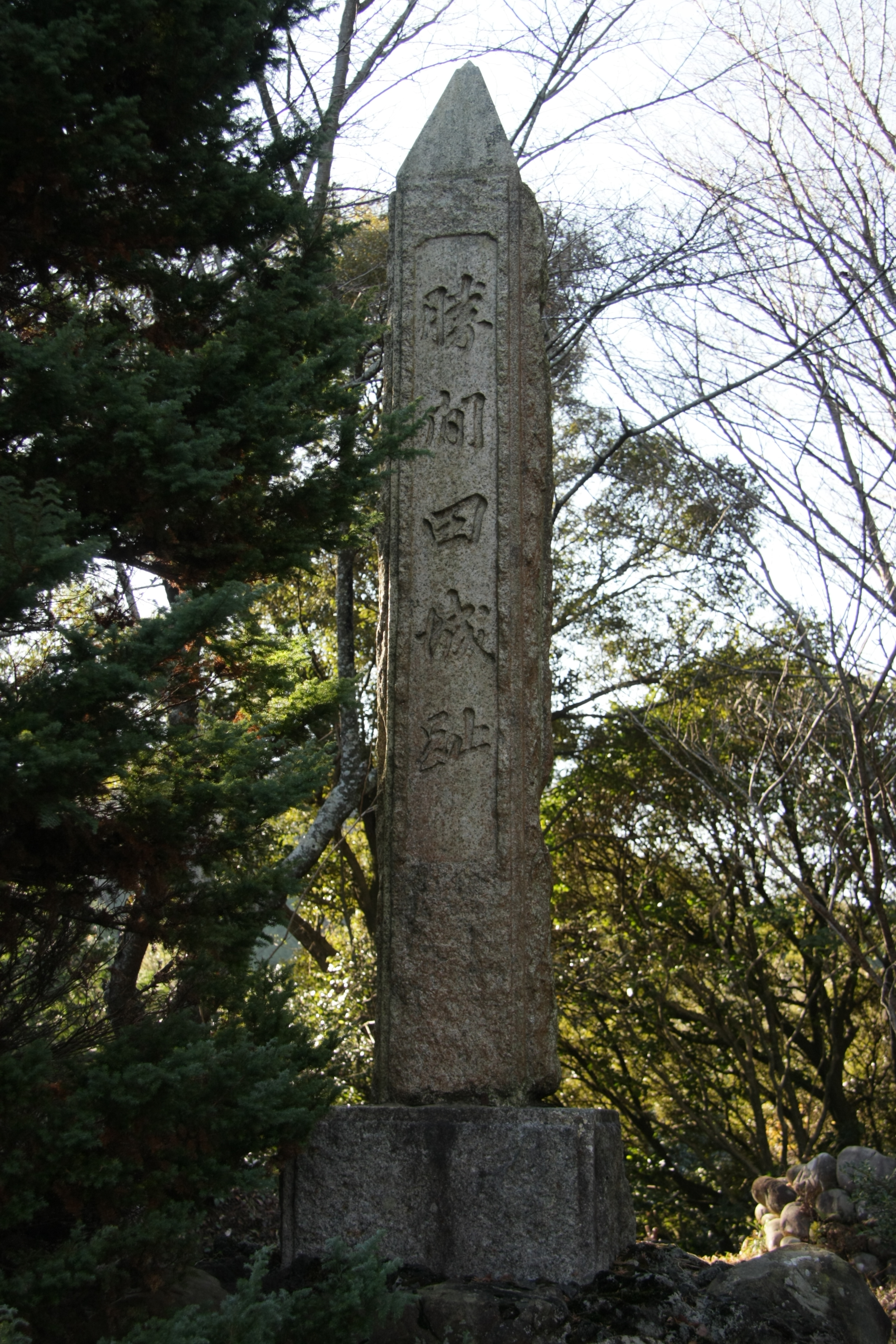
Monument

== See also ==
- List of Historic Sites of Japan (Shizuoka)

== Literature ==
- De Lange, William (2021). An Encyclopedia of Japanese Castles. Groningen: Toyo Press. pp. 600 pages. ISBN 978-9492722300.
