= Shinagawa Takahisa =

Japanese samurai

Shinagawa Takahisa (品川 高久, 1576 – September 1, 1639) was a Japanese samurai of the early Edo period, who served the Tokugawa clan. He was a hatamoto, and the son of Imagawa Ujizane.

== Ancestry ==
Ancestors of Shinagawa Takahisa

16. Imagawa Yoshitada
8. Imagawa Ujichika
17. Lady Kitagawa
4. Imagawa Yoshimoto (1519–1560)
18. Nakamikado Nobutane
9. Jukei-ni (d. 1568)
2. Imagawa Ujizane
20. Takeda Nobutsuna (1471-1507)
10. Takeda Nobutora
5. Jōkei-in (1519-1550)
11. Ōi no kata
1. Shinagawa Takahisa
24. Hojo Soun
12. Hojo Ujitsuna
25. Nan’nyoin-dono
6. Hōjō Ujiyasu
13. Yojuin-dono
3. Lady Hayakawa
