= Yoshisuke =

- Gender: Male

Origin
- Origin: Japanese
- Meaning: Different meanings depending on the kanji used

Yoshisuke (written: 義介, 義助, 義祐 or 良弼) is a masculine Japanese given name. Notable people with the name include:

- Yoshisuke Aikawa (鮎川 義介; 1880–1967), Japanese businessman and politician; founder of the Nissan group
- Atobe Yoshisuke (跡部 良弼; 1799–1869), Japanese samurai
- Fujiwara no Yoshisuke (813–867), Japanese courtier and politician
- Itō Yoshisuke (伊東 義祐; 1512–1585), Japanese daimyō
- Nitta Yoshisuke (新田 義助; 1305–1340), Japanese samurai
- Rokkaku Yoshisuke (六角 義介; died 1612), Japanese daimyō
