= Siege of Hanazawa =

1570 siege in Japan

- Part of the Sengoku period
Date	1570
Location	Hanazawa castle, Suruga province
Result	Takeda victory
Territorial changes	Hanazawa falls to the Takeda

Belligerents
Takeda clan forces	Imagawa clan forces

Commanders and leaders
Takeda Shingen, Nagasaka Tsuruyasu, Hajikano Saemon	Ōhara Sukenaga

The 1570 siege of Hanazawa was one of several battles fought between the Takeda and Imagawa clans during the Takeda's campaign to seize Suruga province, during Japan's Sengoku period.

Hanazawa castle was under the command of Imagawa general Ōhara Sukenaga. Nagasaka Tsuruyasu, Hajikano Saemon, and Takeda Shingen himself led the siege, which was successful in taking the castle after four days.
