= Motozane =

- Gender: Male

Origin
- Origin: Japanese
- Meaning: Different meanings depending on the kanji used

Motozane (written: 元真 or 基実) is a masculine Japanese given name. Notable people with the name include:

- Abe Motozane (安倍 元真; 1513–1587), Japanese samurai
- Fujiwara no Motozane (藤原 元真), Japanese poet
- Konoe Motozane (近衛 基実; 1143–1166), Japanese kugyō
