= Siege of Yoshida Castle =

Siege in 1575 in Mikawa Province, Japan

Coordinates: 34°46′12.53″N 137°23′36.06″E

- Part of the Sengoku period
Date	1575
Location	Yoshida Castle, Mikawa province, Japan
Result	Takeda Withdraw

Belligerents
Takeda clan	Tokugawa clan

Commanders and leaders
Takeda Katsuyori	Sakai Tadatsugu

Strength
Unknown	1,000 garrison 5,000 reinforcement

The 1575 siege of Yoshida Castle was undertaken by Takeda Katsuyori against the forces of Tokugawa Ieyasu during the Sengoku Period of Japanese history. This would be one of many battles fought by the Tokugawa and Takeda samurai clans during Japan's Sengoku period (1467-1603).

== Background ==
The siege was part of Takeda Katsuyori's raid through Mikawa province; Yoshida Castle lay on the site of what is now part of Toyohashi city in Aichi Prefecture.

== Forces ==
Sakai Tadatsugu commanded the castle's garrison in service of Tokugawa Ieyasu. Though the garrison normally numbered 1,000 men, Ieyasu anticipated the attack and reinforced Sakai's forces with 5,000 more warriors.

== Siege ==
The battle consisted almost exclusively of spear combat outside the castle walls. Takeda Katsuyori soon became frustrated, and realized that Sakai had no intention of sending the remainder of his force out of the gates for a full-blown battle. Takeda withdrew and turned towards Nagashino, which would prove to be the decisive end for him and his clan.
