= Siege of Kakegawa =

1569 Tokugawa victory in Japan's Warring States period

Date	1569
Location	Kakegawa Castle, Tōtōmi Province, Japan
Result	Tokugawa victory

Belligerents
Forces of Tokugawa Ieyasu	Imagawa clan forces

Commanders and leaders
Tokugawa Ieyasu; Hattori Hanzō; Kōriki Kiyonaga; Watanabe Moritsuna; Honda Shigetsugu	Imagawa Ujizane (surrendered); Asahina Yasutomo (surrendered)

Strength
19,000	8,000

The 1569 siege of Kakegawa was one of many battles fought by Tokugawa Ieyasu campaign at Suruga province and Tōtōmi Province against Imagawa clan during Japan's Sengoku period.

Imagawa Ujizane, the son of the late Imagawa Yoshimoto, held Kakegawa castle at the time that it was besieged by Hattori Hanzō under the command of Tokugawa Ieyasu. After a five month siege, negotiations began, and Ujizane agreed to surrender the castle in return for the support of Ieyasu in regaining his former territory in Suruga province.
