= Imagawa Norinobu =

Imagawa Norinobu (今川 範叙; 1829 – November 3, 1887) was a Japanese samurai of the late Edo period.

Norinobu was influential in the last days of the Tokugawa shogunate, being appointed a wakadoshiyori shortly before its demise and working for the new government to show clemency to the Tokugawa family.

== Genealogy ==
Born the 3rd son of Imagawa Yoshiyori, he was a hatamoto who headed one of the 26 families holding the position of kōke (master of ceremonies) in the Tokugawa shogunate, a position whose most famous holder was Kira Yoshinaka of Chushingura fame. His childhood name was Hikosaburo (彦三郎).

He was a direct descendant of the famed Imagawa Yoshimoto and his son Ujizane.

== Family ==
- Father: Imagawa Yoshiyori (1810–1841)
- Mother: Matsura Seizan’s daughter
- Wife: Keirin’in (d.1869)
- Children:
  - Imagawa Yoshihito (1854–1872)
  - daughter (d.1862)
  - Sen (1858–1904) married Shino Tomitaka

== Later life ==
Living the rest of his life in quiet obscurity, Norinobu died in 1887. Because his son Imagawa Yoshihito died young, he was left heirless, and the direct line of descent in the Imagawa family came to an end.

== See also ==
- Master of Ceremonies (Japan)
