= Fuji Nobutada =

Japanese samurai

Fuji Nobutada (富士 信忠; ? – September 23, 1583) was a Japanese samurai of the Sengoku period, who served the Imagawa clan.
