= Imagawa Ujiteru =

Japanese daimyō

- 今川 氏輝

Head of Imagawa clan
- In office 1526–1536
- Preceded by: Imagawa Ujichika
- Succeeded by: Imagawa Yoshimoto

Personal details
- Born: 1513
- Died: April 7, 1536 (aged 22–23)
- Relations: Imagawa Yoshimoto (brother)
- Parents: Imagawa Ujichika (father); Jukei-ni (mother)

Military service
- Allegiance: Ashikaga Shogunate; Later Hōjō clan
- Rank: Daimyo
- Unit: Imagawa clan
- Commands: Suruga Province

Imagawa Ujiteru (今川 氏輝; 1513 – April 7, 1536) was a Japanese daimyō of the Sengoku period, who ruled the Imagawa clan of Suruga Province.

His childhood name was Ryuomaru (竜王丸). His father was Imagawa Ujichika and his mother was Jukei-ni (d. 1568). He was the brother of Imagawa Yoshimoto.

In ten years his reign, there was no recorded uprising under his rule which laid the foundation for the successful reign of Yoshimoto and Imagawa clan.

1536, he suffered an illness that led to his death and it started a struggle of Imagawa power known as "Hanakura Conflict" between the Imagawa brothers, his elder half-brother, Genkō Etan and his younger brother Yoshimoto. In the end Yoshimoto succeeded to family headship.

== Family ==
- Father: Imagawa Ujichika (1473–1526)
- Mother: Jukei-ni (d. 1568)
- Brothers:
  - Imagawa Higekoro
  - Imagawa Yoshimoto
  - Imagawa Yoshizane
  - Imagawa Ujitoyo

Preceded by Imagawa Ujichika	8th Suruga-Imagawa family head 1526–1536	Succeeded by Imagawa Yoshimoto
