= Imagawa clan =

Japanese samurai clan

Imagawa 今川
- The emblem (mon) of the Imagawa clan
- Home province: Suruga; Tōtōmi; Mikawa
- Parent house: Ashikaga clan
- Titles: Various
- Founder: Imagawa Kuniuji
- Final ruler: Imagawa Ujizane
- Founding year: 13th century
- Ruled until: 1560
- Cadet branches: Horikoshi clan Sena clan

Imagawa clan (Japanese: 今川氏, Hepburn: Imagawa-uji) was a Japanese samurai clan that claimed descent from the Seiwa Genji by way of the Kawachi Genji.

== Origins ==
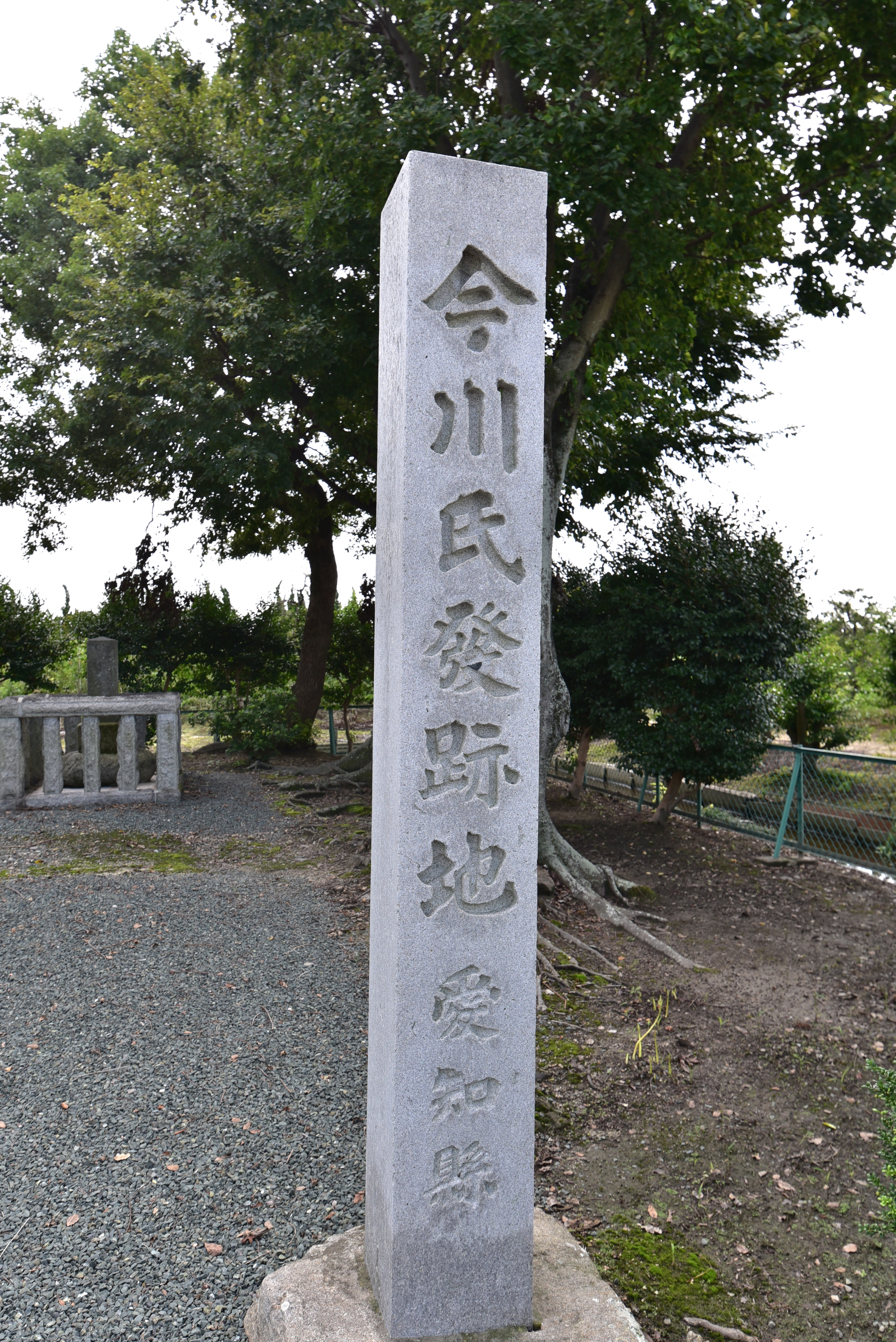
Monument of the birthplace of the Imagawa clan（Nishio, Aichi Prefecture）

Ashikaga Kuniuji, grandson of Ashikaga Yoshiuji, established himself in the 13th century at Imagawa (Mikawa Province) and took its name.

Imagawa Norikuni (1295–1384) received the provinces of Tōtōmi, and later Suruga, from his cousin Shōgun Ashikaga Takauji

== Located at ==
Ounami no Kori, Mikawa (modern day Nishio, Aichi) mainly Suruga Province and Tōtōmi Province during the Warring States period

== Crests ==
- Two hikiryou
- Yoshimoto's version of the akaitori (pictured)
- Two hikiryou and a paulownia planted in white soil

== Major figures ==
- Imagawa Yoshitada
- Imagawa Ujichika
- Imagawa Ujiteru
- Imagawa Yoshimoto
- Imagawa Ujizane
- Imagawa Sadayo, was a renowned Japanese poet and military commander who served as tandai ("constable") of Kyūshū under the Ashikaga bakufu from 1371 to 1395.

== Muromachi era ==
The clan was a branch of the Ashikaga shogunate. For this reason, they were appointed as the provincial constables (shugo) of Suruga and Tōtōmi during that time. They were recognized as a highly prestigious clan, so much so that it was said, "Should the shogunate line perish, the Kira will succeed; should the Kira line perish, the Imagawa will succeed."

== Sengoku era ==
During the Sengoku period in the 1540s and 1550s, Yoshimoto Imagawa attempted to establish his clan as the strongest in eastern Japan. However, after the death of Yoshimoto at the Battle of Okehazama in 1560, many Imagawa officers defected to other clans. Once a powerful clan. Within a decade, the clan had lost its entire land holdings to the Tokugawa and Takeda clans. The Imagawa subsequently became masters of ceremonies in the service of the Tokugawa clan.

== Clan castles ==
Separated by province name.

- Suruga Province: Imagawa Kan (later known as Sunpu Castle), Shizuhatayama Castle, Mochifune Castle, Tanaka Castle
- Tōtōmi Province: Kakegawa Castle, Takatenjin Castle, Futamata Castle, Inui Castle, Hamamatsu Castle, Utsuyama Castle.
- Mikawa Province: Yoshida Castle, Tahara Castle, Okazaki Castle, Anjō Castle
- Owari Province: Katsukake Castle, Ōdaka Castle, Narumi Castle

== Edo period ==
- Shinagawa Takahisa, the son of Imagawa Ujizane. He was a hatamoto and served the Tokugawa clan.
- Imagawa Norinobu, an Imagawa of the late Edo period, was a wakadoshiyori in the Tokugawa administration.

== Key genealogies ==
Takeda clan
Minamoto no Yoshichika | Minamoto no Yoshikuni | Minamoto no Yoshinari | Takeda Yoshikiyo
Ashikaga clan | Nitta clan | Satake clan
Minamoto no Tameyoshi | Ashikaga Yoshiyasu | Nitta Yoshishige | Satake Masayoshi
Minamoto no Yoshitomo | Ashikaga Yoshikane
Kamakura Shogun; Minamoto no Yoritomo | Ashikaga Yoshiuji
Kira clan
Ashikaga Yasuuji | Kira Osauji
Imagawa clan
Ashikaga Yoriuji | Kira Mitsuji | Imagawa Kuniuji
Ashikaga Ietoki
Ashikaga Sadauji
Muromachi Shogun; Ashikaga Takauji | Nitta Yoshisada

Suruga

1. Imagawa Kuniuji (1243–1282)
2. Imagawa Morouji (1261–1323)
3. Imagawa Norikuni (1295?-1384)
4. Imagawa Noriuji (1316–1365)
5. Imagawa Yasunori (1334?-1409?)
6. Imagawa Norimasa (1364–1433)
7. Imagawa Noritada (1408-1461?)
8. Imagawa Yoshitada
9. Imagawa Ujichika
10. Imagawa Ujiteru
11. Imagawa Yoshimoto
12. Imagawa Ujizane
13. Imagawa Naofusa (1594–1662)
14. Imagawa Ujinari (1642–1673)
15. Imagawa Ujimichi (1668–1699)
16. Imagawa Noritaka (1694–1712)
17. Imagawa Norinushi (1698–1728)
18. Imagawa Norihiko (1716–1749)
19. Imagawa Noriyasu (1731–1784)
20. Imagawa Yoshiaki (1756–1818)
21. Imagawa Yoshimochi (1786–1839)
22. Imagawa Yoshiyori (1810–1841)
23. Imagawa Norinobu
24. Imagawa Yoshihito (1854-1872)

Tōtōmi

- Imagawa Sadayo (1326-1420?)
- Imagawa Nakaaki
- Imagawa Sadaomi
- Imagawa Sadasuke
- Imagawa Norimasa (?-1464)
- Imagawa Sadanobu (?-1474)

Tōtōmi (Horikoshi branch)

- Horikoshi Sadamoto (?-1537)
- Horikoshi Ujinobu
- Horikoshi Sadatada
- Horikoshi Sadahisa
- Horikoshi Sadayoshi
- Horikoshi Sadatsugu

Tōtōmi (Sena branch)

- Sena Kazuhide
- Sena Ujisada
- Sena Ujitoshi
- Sena Ujiakira
- Sena Masakatsu
- Sena Kiyosada

== Notable members ==
- Jukei-ni
- Lady Tsukiyama
- Lady Hayakawa

== Notable retainers ==
- Matsudaira Motoyasu
- Toyotomi Hideyoshi
- Okabe Motonobu
- Matsui Munenobu
- Udono Nagateru
- Asahina Yasutomo
- Ii Naomori
- Abe Motozane
- Ichinomiya Munekore
- Ii Naochika
- Ii Naotora
- Iio Tsuratatsu
- Otazu no kata
- Katsurayama Ujimoto
- Taigen Sessai
- Iio Noritsura
- Itami Yasunao
- Yamaguchi Noritsugu
- Yamaguchi Noriyoshi
- Yokoe Magohachi
- Fuji Nobutada

== Popular culture ==
Imagawa is a playable nation in Europa Universalis IV.
