= Ichinomiya Munekore =

Ichinomiya Munekore (一宮 宗是, died June 12, 1563) was a retainer beneath the clan of Imagawa throughout the latter Sengoku Period of Feudal Japan.

In 1554 Takeda Shingen initiated a campaign into Shinano province, and as the Imagawa and the Takeda both shared a mutual friendship, Munekore and other supporters of the Imagawa were dispatched to support the latter. In 1563 Munekore lost his life at the Battle of Ushiro in battle against the Takeda clan.
