= Jukei-ni =

Japanese noble lady

Jukei-ni Amamidai
- 寿桂尼
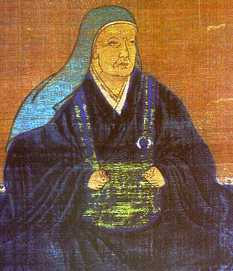
- Jukei-ni in nun's robe

Personal life
- Born: c. 1490 Kyoto, Japan
- Died: April 11, 1568 Suruga Province, Japan
- Spouse: Imagawa Ujichika
- Children: Imagawa Ujiteru; Imagawa Hikogoro; Imagawa Yoshimoto; Zuikei-in
- Parent: Nakamikado Nobutane

Religious life
- Religion: Buddhism
- Dharma name: Jukei-ni
- Consecration: Ryuunji Temple
- Military career
- Unit: Imagawa clan

Jukei-ni (寿桂尼; c. 1490 - 11 April 1568) was a Japanese noble lady who acted as the power behind the throne or de facto daimyo of the Imagawa clan during the Sengoku period. She was born in the aristocrat Nakamikado Family of Kyoto. Jukei-ni was the wife of Imagawa Ujichika and mother of Imagawa Ujiteru, Imagawa Yoshimoto and Zukei-ni. She acted as guardian and advisor for Ujichika, Ujiteru, Yoshimoto and her grandson Imagawa Ujizane. Jukei-ni is also known as ''Onna Daimyo'' and "Amamidai", once proclaimed that she would "protect Imagawa to her grave".

== Life ==
She was a daughter of the Dainagon Nakamikado Nobutane, and was from the Nakamikado clan, an aristocrat family close to the Emperor in Kyoto. There are no details about her early life and her real name, she is best known by her Dharma name, Imagawa Jukei-ni (寿桂 尼). She politically married Imagawa Ujichika, the lord of two provinces - Suruga and Tōtōmi, between 1505-1508. The Imagawa family was known for its affinity for the arts and maintained strong relations with Kyoto after Jukei-ni's entry into the Imagawa clan.

Jukei-ni's husband was at the time engaged in land surveying and quantification, and it was he who created the ''Imagawa Kana Mokuroku'', a detailed work on the laws governing the Imagawa lands. It was Ujichika who elevated the Imagawa family from their previous position as shugo daimyō into the ranks of the Sengoku daimyō. During the marriage, she had four children, but there is a theory that she had five. Her most famous children were Imagawa Ujiteru, Hikogoro, Yoshimoto and Zukei-ni. The three became samurai warlords, and their daughter Zukei-ni entered into a diplomatic marriage with Hojo Ujiyasu, an initial step towards the formation of the Kōsōsun Triple Alliance. This alliance placed the daughters of the Imagawa clan, Takeda and Hojo in a political marriage, strengthening the ties between them, but it gave rise to the beginning of many diplomatic wars in neighboring regions.

Jukei-ni helped form the laws in the Imagawa clan's domain, acting actively as a political advisor during her husband's administration. Later, under the influence of "Imagawa Kana Mokuroku", she acted as regent during the reign of her descendants. In 1526, when Ujichika died, his eldest son, Ujiteru, was still only 14 years old. However, Ujiteru was not only young, he was also ill. In this case, one of the highest retainers should assume the role of regent as Daimyo, but Jukei-ni took that position. This position was traditionally assumed by men, and the reason why Jukei-ni assumed for herself as leader of a powerful clan is not known. Women taking up positions as regents of their lords were more common in smaller clans.

The most commonly believed reason was that ten years before his death, Ujichika was struck by an illness that kept him confined in his private quarters. While taking care of her husband, Jukeini also began to take responsibility for the family's political affairs. House officials also believed that "in the same way while Ujichika was still alive, Jukeini became an adviser to Ujiteru". Two years after Ujichika's death, a seal with the Jukeini brand began to appear in public documents released by the Imagawa family.

She served as a political advisor for Yoshimoto and Ujizane as well. Jukei-ni's grandson, Imagawa Ujizane, is known for marrying Hojo Ujiyasu's daughter, Lady Hayakawa, thus initiating the triple alliance. For having passed four generations of Daimyos, Jukei-ni had great political power in Suruga, Totomi, and Mikawa provinces and was known as "Female Daimyō" of Imagawa clan. During the reign of her grandson, it became evident that she was the real head of the Imagawa clan, leaving Ujizane only as a representative figure.

Jukei-ni died in 1568 at almost 80 years of age and is said to have truly been the last pillar of the Imagawa family as Sengoku Daimyo. Diplomatic relations between Imagawa and Takeda collapsed after the death of Jukei-ni, and in December of the same year Takeda Shigen began the invasion in the region of Imagawa (Invasion of the Suruga). Because of this crisis, Imagawa Ujizane surrenders to Tokugawa Ieyasu the following year.

== Family ==
- Father: Nakamikado Nobutane
- Husband: Imagawa Ujichika
- Children:
  - Imagawa Ujiteru
  - Imagawa Hikogoro (d.1536)
  - Imagawa Yoshimoto
  - Zuikei-in married Hojo Ujiyasu

== See also ==
- List of female castellans in Japan
