= Inoo Tsuratatsu =

Japanese military commander

Inoo Tsuratatsu (飯尾 連龍; died January 11, 1566) was a Japanese military commander of the Sengoku period who served the Imagawa clan. The son of Inoo Noritsura, Tsuratatsu served Imagawa Ujizane and held Hikuma Castle in Tôtômi province. He was the husband of Otazu no kata.

In 1564, the Imagawa discovered that he was secretly communicating with Tokugawa Ieyasu and attacked Hikuma Castle. The castle held, but the following year, Tsuratasu was summoned by Ujizane to Suruga, where he was assassinated.
