= Atobe Yoshisuke =

Japanese samurai (1799–1869)

Atobe Yoshisuke (跡部 良弼; November 18, 1799 – February 1, 1869) was a Japanese samurai of the late Edo period. A hatamoto serving the Tokugawa shōgun, Yoshisuke was the biological younger brother of the Bakufu senior councilor Mizuno Tadakuni. Atobe was not known for his good relations with daimyōs, having once angered Date Yoshikuni, the powerful lord of Sendai in Mutsu Province by throwing him out of a highway lodging.

He served as the governor of Yamashiro Province.

Atobe was appointed to the post of wakadoshiyori in 1868, and died roughly a year later.
