= Wakadoshiyori =

Government officials in Japan's Edo period

The Wakadoshiyori (若年寄), or "Junior Elders", were high government officials in the Edo period Japan under the Tokugawa shogunate (1603-1867). The position was established around 1633, but appointments were irregular until 1662. The four to six wakadoshiyori were subordinates to the rōjū in status, but they ranked above the jisha-bugyō. The served for a month at a time on a rotating basis and were selected from the ranks of the fudai daimyō. There were periods when the number of wakadoshiyori rose to 6 or 7 at one time.

The wakadoshiyori were tasked with supervising the direct vassals of the shōgun, namely the hatamoto and gokenin using reports provided by the metsuke. They also oversaw the activities of artisans and physicians, organised and supervised public works projects and were in change of the shōgun's personal guards. In the event of war, the wakadoshiyori were theoretically to lead the hatamoto in battle.

== List of Wakadoshiyori ==
=== Under Tokugawa Iemitsu (1623–1651) ===
- Matsudaira Nobutsuna (1633–1635)
- Abe Tadaaki (1633–1635)
- Hotta Masamori (1633–1635)
- Abe Shigetsugu (1633–1638)
- Ōta Sukemune (1633–1638)
- Miura Masatsugu (1633–1639)
- Dōi Toshitaka (1635–1638)
- Sakai Tadatomo (1635–1638)
- Kutsuki Tanetsuna (1635–1649)

=== Under Tokugawa Ietsuna (1651–1680) ===
- Kuze Hiroyuki (1662–1663)
- Tsuchiya Kazunao (1662–1665)
- Doi Toshifusa (1663–1679)
- Nagai Naotsune (1665–1670)
- Hotta Masatoshi (1670–1679)
- Matsudaira Nobuoki (1679–1682)
- Ishikawa Norimasa (1679–1682)

=== Under Tokugawa Tsunayoshi (1680–1709) ===
- Hotta Masahide (1681–1685)
- Inaba Masayasu (1682–1684)
- Akimoto Takatomo (1682–1699)
- Naitō Shigeyori (1684–1685)
- Matsudaira Tadachika (1685)
- Ōta Sukenao (1685–1686)
- Inagaki Shigesada (1685–1689)
- Ōkubo Tadamasu (1687–1688)
- Miura Akihiro (1689)
- Yamauchi Toyoakira (1689)
- Matsudaira Nobutaka (1689–1690)
- Naitō Masachika (1690–1694)
- Katō Akihide (1690–1711)
- Matsudaira Masahisa (1694–1696)
- Yonekura Masatada (1696–1699)
- Honda Masanaga (1696–1704)
- Inoue Masamine (1699–1705)
- Inagaki Shigetomi (1699–1709)
- Nagai Naohiro (1704–1711)
- Kuze Shigeyuki (1705–1713)
- Ōkubo Norihiro (1706–1723)

=== Under Tokugawa Ienobu (1709–1712) and Tokugawa Ietsugu (1713–1716) ===
- Torii Tadateru (1711–1716)
- Mizuno Tadayuki (1711–1714)
- Ōkubo Tsuneharu (1713–1728)
- Morikawa Toshitane (1714–1717)

=== Under Tokugawa Yoshimune (1716–1745) ===
- Ishikawa Fusashige (1717–1725)
- Matsudaira Norikata (1723–1735)
- Mizuno Tadasada (1723–1748)
- Honda Tadamune (1725–1750)
- Ōta Sukeharu (1728–1734)
- Koide Hidesada (1732–1744)
- Nishio Tadanao (1734–1745)
- Itakura Katsukiyo (1735–1760)
- Toda Ujifusa (1744–1758)

=== Under Tokugawa Ieshige (1745–1760) ===
- Kanō Hisamichi (1745–1748)
- Hori Naohisa (1745–1748)
- Miura Yoshisato (1745–1749)
- Hotta Masanobu (1745–1751)
- Akimoto Suketomo (1747)
- Kobori Masamine (1748–1751, 1756–1760)
- Koide Fusayoshi (1748–1767)
- Matsudaira Tadatsune (1748–1768)
- Sakai Tadayoshi (1749–1761, 1761–1787)
- Ōoka Tadamitsu (1754–1756)
- Honda Tadahide (1758)
- Mizuno Tadachika (1758–1775)

=== Under Tokugawa Iesada (1853–1858) and Tokugawa Iemochi (1858–1866) ===
- Sakai Tadasuke (1853–1862, 1863, 1864–1866)
- Andō Nobumasa (1858–1860)
- Mizuno Tadakiyo (1861–1862)
- Ogasawara Nagamichi (1862)

=== Under Tokugawa Yoshinobu (1867–1868) ===
- Hoshina Masaari (1866–1867)
- Ōkōchi Masatada (1866–1867)
- Kyōgoku Takatomi (1866–1868)
- Asano Ujisuke (1867)
- Kawakatsu Kōun (1867)
- Nagai Naoyuki (1867–1868)
- Matsudaira Chikayoshi (1867–1868)
- Takenaka Shigekata (1867–1868)
- Hori Naotora (1867–1868)
- Tsukahara Masayoshi (1867–1868)
- Katsu Kaishū (1868)
- Ōkubo Ichiō (1868)
- Hattori Tsunezumi (1868)
- Imagawa Norinobu (1868)
- Atobe Yoshisuke (1868)
- Kawatsu Sukekuni, also known as Kawazu Sukekune (1868).
- Mukōyama Ippaku (1868)
- Kondō Isami (1868)

=== Wakadoshiyori-kaku ===
The wakadoshiyori-kaku were bakufu officials ranking as wakadoshiyori, but not actually appointed as such. List of wakadoshiyori-kaku

- Nagai Naomune (1867–1868).

== See also ==
- Bugyō
