= Lady Hayakawa =

Japanese 17th century aristocrat

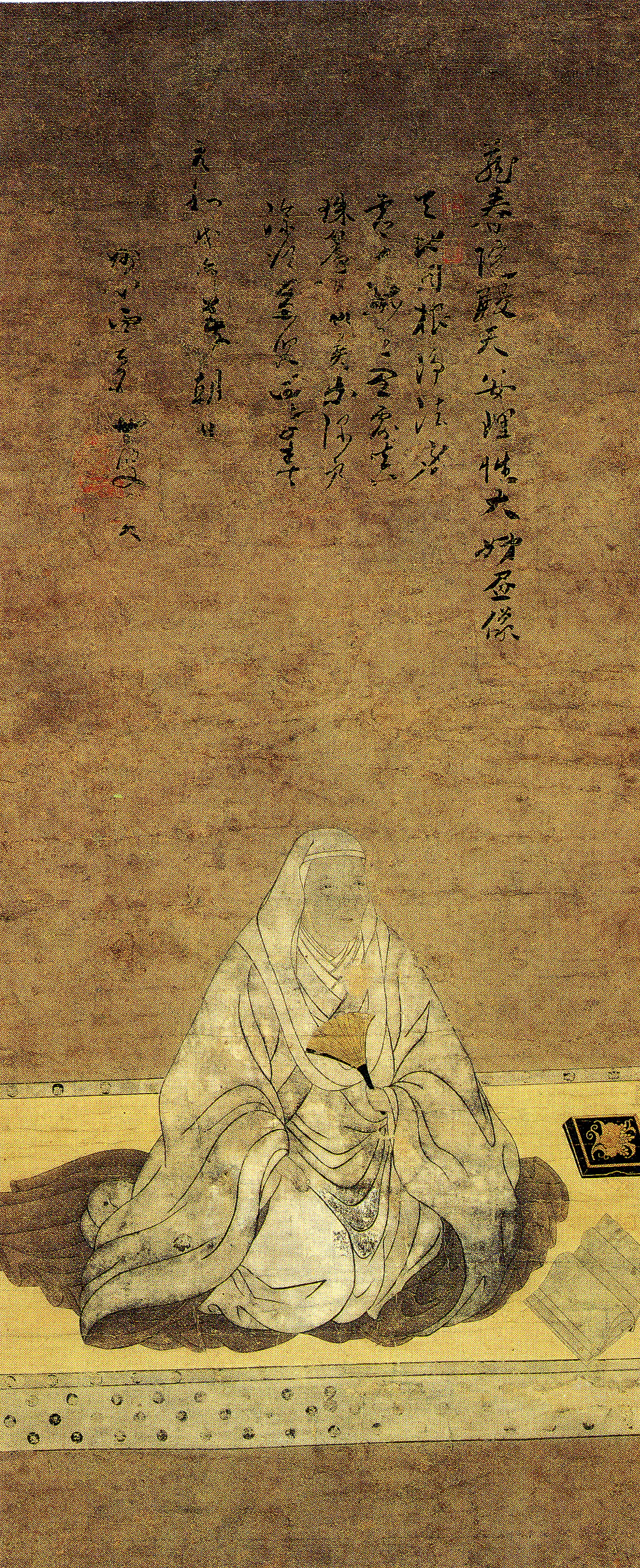
Anonymous portrait of Lady Hayakawa

Lady Hayakawa (早川殿, Hayakawa-Dono, died April 4, 1613) was a Japanese aristocrat of the Sengoku period. Hayakawa is a common nickname for one of Daimyō Hōjō Ujiyasu's daughters, who lived in the Sengoku through early Edo periods. She is best known for marrying into the Imagawa clan as a condition for The Kōsōsun Triple Alliance, an alliance which put daughters of the Takeda, Imagawa and Hojo clans into political marriages. The formation of the alliance would later change the fate of these three powerful clans.

== Life ==
Her year of birth is unknown but is generally thought to be between 1546 and 1548. Current theories suggest that she was the fourth daughter of Hōjō Ujiyasu, daimyō of Sagami province in Kanto. Her mother was probably Zuikeii-in, sister of Imagawa Yoshimoto.

In 1554, she married Imagawa Ujizane, her cousin, as an agreement of the Kai-Sagami-Suruga alliance, of which she had five children. Due to their political marriage, the Hojo, Takeda, and Imagawa clans became allies.

However, in 1568, Takeda Shingen violated the agreement and invaded the Imagawa. In 1571, Ujiyasu died, and his last wish was to renew his alliance with Takeda. Instead, she ran away with her husband and joined Tokugawa. In 1590, Toyotomi Hideyoshi invaded the Hojo during the Siege of Odawara. Hayakawa's brothers and mother died. She died in 1613 in Edo. Lady Hayakawa and Imagawa Ujizane were the only couple in the Kai-Sagami-Suruga alliance who did not divorce; they continued to live together for the rest of their lives.

Her grave stands at Kansen-ji in modern-day Suginami, Tokyo.

== Family ==
- Father: Hōjō Ujiyasu
- Father-in-law: Imagawa Yoshimoto
- Husband: Imagawa Ujizane
- Sons:
  - Imagawa Norimochi
  - Shinagawa Takahisa
