= Yoshida Castle (Mikawa Province) =

Coordinates: 34°46′12.53″N 137°23′36.06″E

Yoshida Castle 吉田城
- Toyohashi, Aichi Prefecture, Japan
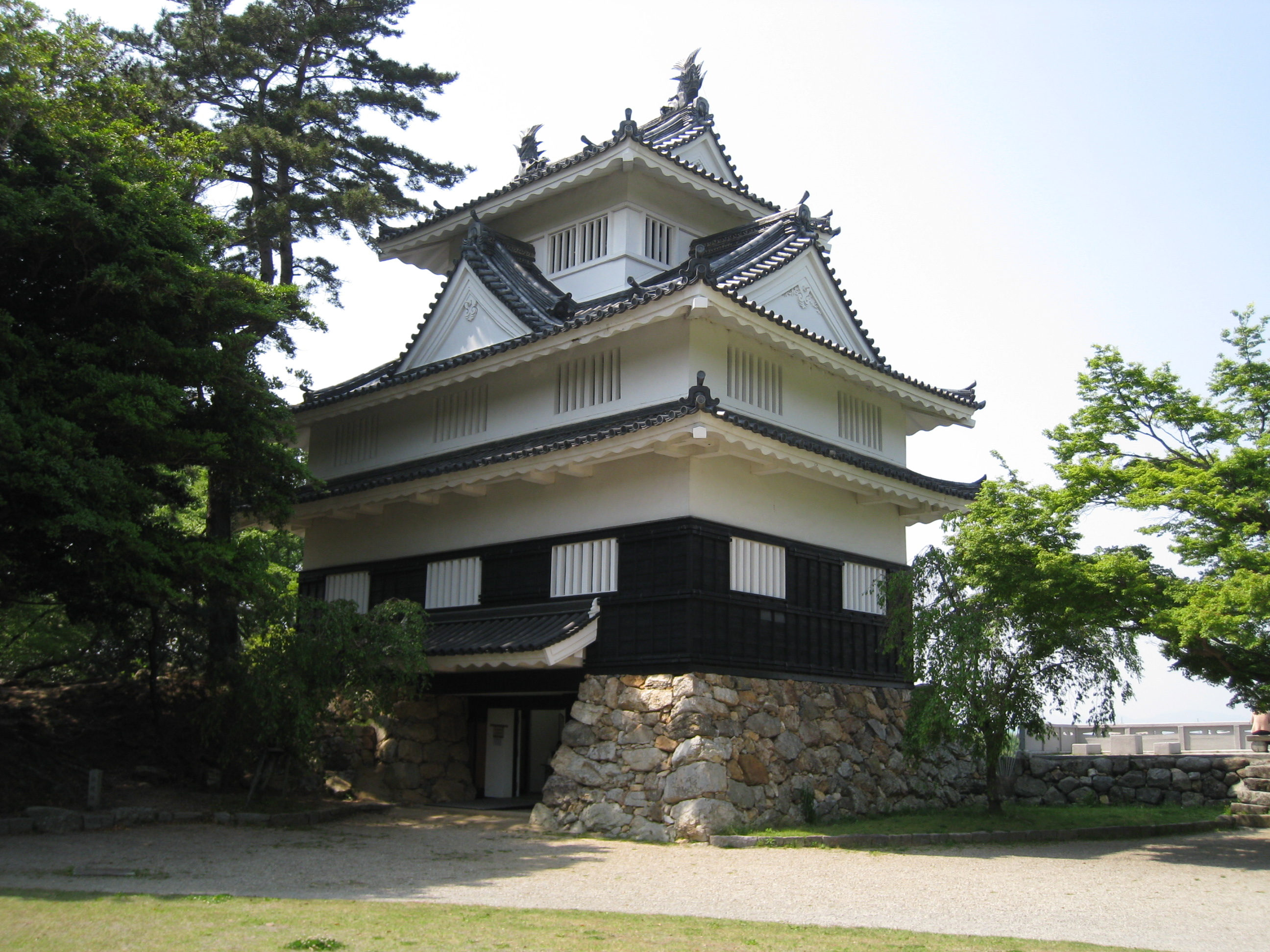
- Reconstructed Kurogane Yagura of Yoshida Castle

Site information
- Type: flatland-style Japanese castle
- Open to the public: yes
- Condition: reconstructed 1954

Site history
- Built: 1505
- In use: Edo period
- Demolished: 1945

Yoshida Castle (吉田城, Yoshida-jō) is a Japanese castle located in Toyohashi, southeastern Aichi Prefecture, Japan. At the end of the Edo period, Yoshida Castle was home to the Inaba clan, daimyō of Tateyama Domain. The castle was also known as Imabashi Castle (今橋城, Imabashi-jō) and later as Toyohashi Castle.

== Description ==
Yoshida Castle is a flat-land style Japanese castle, built on the west bank of the Toyogawa (river). The main bailey was enclosed by a moat, with three three-story yagura, one two-story yagura, and three gates. The second and third baileys were also moated and had smaller yagura and fortified gates. Aside from some remnants of the stonework on the moats, nothing remains of the original structures. The present “castle” is a modern reconstruction of one of the three-story yagura. It houses a small museum with articles pertaining to local history.

== History ==
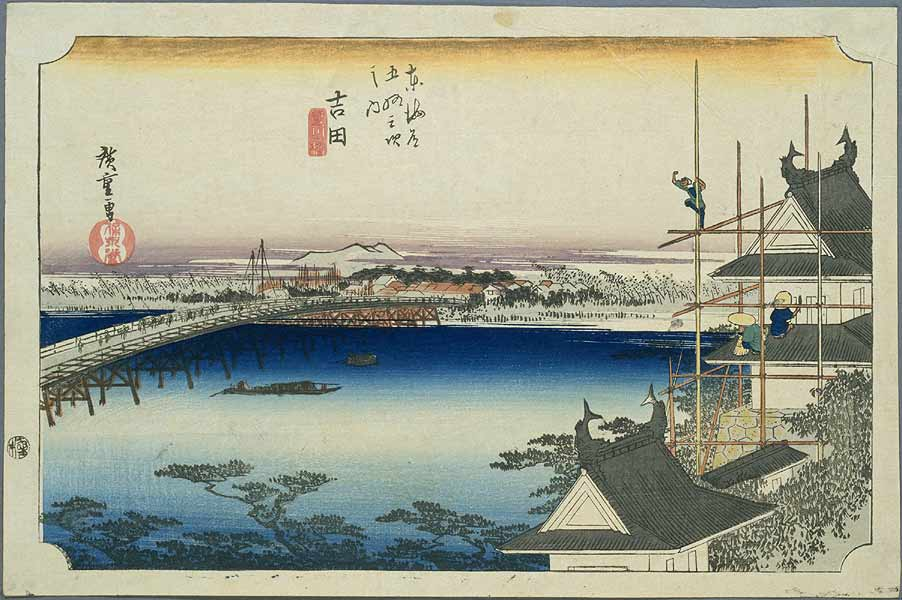
Yoshida Castle under construction

A castle was built on the banks of the Toyogawa (river) in 1505 by Makino Kohaku, a retainer of Imagawa Ujichika to secure his foothold in eastern Mikawa Province against the growing power of the Matsudaira clan in western Mikawa Province. Due to its strategic location on a river crossing, the castle was involved in numerous battles during the Sengoku period, changing hands several times, and was destroyed and rebuilt on several occasions. In 1565, the castle came under the control of Tokugawa Ieyasu, who named Sakai Tadatsugu as castellan.

Following the Battle of Odawara in 1590, Toyotomi Hideyoshi ordered the Tokugawa clan to relocate to the Kantō region and assigned the castle to Ikeda Terumasa. Ikeda developed the surrounding castle town and embarked on a massive and ambitious plan to rebuild Yoshida Castle. However, following the Battle of Sekigahara, he was relocated to Himeji Castle. Construction of the castle was incomplete, and the central keep was never built.

After the establishment of the Tokugawa shogunate, Yoshida Castle became the center of Yoshida Domain, a feudal domain that occupied a strategic position on the Tōkaidō (road) between Edo and Nagoya. The domain was assigned to several fudai daimyō clans until the Matsudaira (Nagasawa-Ōkōchi) clan took possession in 1752; they remained in residence at Yoshida until the Meiji Restoration. The final daimyō of Yoshida, Matsudaira Nobuhisa, surrendered the castle without resistance to the Meiji government in 1868. The castle was turned over to the fledgling Imperial Japanese Army in 1871 but was largely destroyed in a fire in 1873.

Much of the castle grounds remained in the hands of the military (as the garrison of the IJA 18th Infantry Regiment) until the end of World War II.

Following the end of the war, a portion of the third bailey was transformed into Toyohashi Park, and the modern Toyohashi City Hall was constructed on another portion. In 1954, the three-story Kurogane Yagura (黒金櫓) was reconstructed out of reinforced concrete. An art museum and sports facilities were later erected on the site of the inner baileys. The stonework was extensively repaired in 2005.

The Castle was listed as one of the Continued Top 100 Japanese Castles in 2017.

== Literature ==
- De Lange, William (2021). An Encyclopedia of Japanese Castles. Groningen: Toyo Press. pp. 600 pages. ISBN 978-9492722300.
- Schmorleitz, Morton S. (1974). Castles in Japan. Tokyo: Charles E. Tuttle Co. pp. 144–145. ISBN 0-8048-1102-4.
- Motoo, Hinago (1986). Japanese Castles. Tokyo: Kodansha. p. 200 pages. ISBN 0-87011-766-1.
- Mitchelhill, Jennifer (2004). Castles of the Samurai: Power and Beauty. Tokyo: Kodansha. p. 112 pages. ISBN 4-7700-2954-3.
- Turnbull, Stephen (2003). Japanese Castles 1540-1640. Osprey Publishing. p. 64 pages. ISBN 1-84176-429-9.
