= Iio Noritsura =

Japanese samurai

Iio Noritsura (飯尾 乗連; died 1560) was a Japanese samurai of the Sengoku period, who served the Imagawa clan of Suruga. He was the governor of Hikuma Castle, and claimed the court title Buzen no kami. Noritsura's service to the Imagawa clan was during the life of Imagawa Yoshimoto. During the Eishō era (1504–1521), Noritsura built Hikuma Castle, and received it and 10,000 koku of territory around it as a personal fief. He died at the Battle of Okehazama in 1560.

Noritsura's son was Iio Tsuratatsu.
