= Abe Motozane =

- Era: Sengoku

Abe Motozane (安倍 元真; 1513 – November 10, 1587) was a Japanese samurai of the Sengoku period, who first served the Imagawa clan. He was involved in the defense of Sunpu Castle, but had to retreat when Takeda Shingen attacked. He later served Tokugawa Ieyasu in his battle against the Takeda clan in 1577, where he defended Hōkizuka Castle and defeating Miura Uemonnosuke.
