= Imagawa Yoshitada =

- 今川 義忠

Head of Imagawa clan
- In office 1461–1476
- Preceded by: Imagawa Noritada
- Succeeded by: Imagawa Ujichika

Personal details
- Born: February 26, 1436
- Died: March 1, 1476 (aged 40)
- Spouse: Lady Kitagawa
- Children: Imagawa Ujichika
- Parents: Imagawa Noritada (father); Uesugi Ujisada's daughter (mother)

Military service
- Allegiance: Imagawa clan
- Rank: Daimyo
- Commands: Suruga Province
- Battles/wars: Tōtōmi Campaign

Imagawa Yoshitada (今川 義忠; February 26, 1436 – March 1, 1476) was the father of the famed Imagawa Ujichika and the 9th head of the Imagawa clan.

Yoshitada spent most of his time invading Tōtōmi Province, attacking the Katsumada and Yokota clans. However, after Yoshitada thought he had destroyed the clans of Katsumada and Yokota, and he was returning to his home at Suruga, he was attacked and killed at Shiokaizaka by the remnants of the two clans he thought to have completely destroyed.

After Yoshitada's death, he was succeeded by his eldest son, the five-year-old Imagawa Ujichika, known as Tatsuomaru (龍王丸). There was a succession dispute with a more mature cousin, Oga Norimitsu, that forced Tatsuomaru and his mother into hiding until an agreement was reached in 1478 whereby Norimitsu would act as regent until Tatsuomaru came of age. Tatsuomaru killed Norimitsu in 1487 and assume control of the Imagawa domain.

== Family ==
- Father: Imagawa Noritada (1408-1461?)
- Mother: Uesugi Ujisada's daughter
- Wife: Lady Kitagawa
- Children:
  - daughter married Ogimachi Sanjo Sanemichi by Lady Kitagawa
  - Imagawa Ujichika by Lady Kitagawa

Preceded by ??	6th Suruga-Imagawa family head ????–1476	Succeeded by Imagawa Ujichika
