= Imagawa Ujichika =

Japanese daimyō

- 今川 氏親

Head of Imagawa clan
- In office 1476–1526
- Preceded by: Imagawa Yoshitada
- Succeeded by: Imagawa Ujiteru

Personal details
- Born: 1473
- Died: 1526 (aged 52–53)
- Spouse: Jukei-ni
- Children: Imagawa Ujiteru; Imagawa Yoshimoto
- Parents: Imagawa Yoshitada (father); Lady Kitagawa (mother)

Military service
- Allegiance: Later Hōjō clan
- Rank: Daimyo
- Unit: Imagawa clan
- Commands: Suruga Province
- Battles/wars: Tōtōmi Campaign; Mikawa Campaign

Imagawa Ujichika (今川 氏親; 1473 – August 1, 1526) was a Japanese daimyō of the Sengoku period. He was the 10th head of the Imagawa clan of Suruga Province. Ujichika was the son of Imagawa Yoshitada. He was the husband of Jukei-ni.

== Biography ==
In 1476, Ujichika father, Yoshitada, invaded Tōtōmi Province and defeated the Katsumada and Yokota clans. On the return to Suruga, however, he was waylaid at Shiokaizaka and was attacked and killed by the remnants of the two families.

A succession dispute between supporters of Yoshitada's infant son, Ujichika, and Yoshitada cousin Oshika Norimitsu developed. Uesugi Sadamasa and Ashikaga Masatomo became involved. Hōjō Sōun proposed that until Ujichika had his coming of age ceremony, Oshika Norimitsu act as regent in his name. This averted armed conflict within the Imagawa, at least temporarily.

However, when Ujichika turned 17, Norimitsu would not turn over control of the Imagawa clan to him, and hostilities resumed. Hōjō Sōun attacked Norimitsu's mansion on Ujichika's behalf and once Norimitsu was defeated, Ujichika assumed his position as head of the clan. He gave asylum to Ashikaga Yoshizumi after the latter fled Kyoto in 1491 and afterwards escorted him back.

Ujichika was a capable leader, he spent much time campaigning in Tōtōmi and Mikawa, strengthening the position of the Imagawa on the Tokai Coast.

His general, Fukushima Hyōgo, was defeated by Takeda Nobutora at 'Battle of Iidagawara' in 1521.

He died of illness in 1526 and was succeeded by his eldest son Imagawa Ujiteru. Ujichika is remembered for sending three of his six sons to various temples to become monks and for building Nagoya Castle in Owari in 1525 – both of which were considered somewhat unusual, the latter because the Imagawa had only the most tenuous of holds over Owari Province.

== Legislative Acts ==
Ujichika composed the Imagawa house code, the Imagawa Kana Mokuroku, in 1526. Clauses included such stipulations as the punishment for unlawful entry of another's residence (article 7), the imposition of capital punishment in violent quarrels between retainers (article 8), the accountability of the parents of children (of retainers) involved in fights (article 11), regulations concerning the private sale and leasing of land (articles 13–15), debt repayment (article 17), and forbidding retainers of the Imagawa to arrange marriages with houses outside the Imagawa domain (article 30).

== Family ==
- Father: Imagawa Yoshitada
- Mother: Lady Kitagawa
- Wife: Jukei-ni (d. 1568)
- Concubine: Fukushima Masanari’s daughter
- Children:
  - Imagawa Ujiteru by Jukei-ni
  - Imagawa Hikogoro (d.1536) by Jukei-ni
  - Genkō Etan (1517–1536) by Fukushima Masanari’s daughter
  - Shōji Senjō (1518–1588)
  - Imagawa Yoshimoto by Jukei-ni
  - Imagawa Ujitoyo (b. 1522)
  - Tokuzo-in married Kira Yoshitaka
  - Zuikei-in married Hojo Ujiyasu
  - daughter married Ogasawara Haruyoshi
  - daughter married Matsudaira Chikayoshi later married Udono Nagamochi
  - daughter married Nakamikado Nobutsuna
  - daughter married Sena Ujitoshi
  - daughter married Sekiguchi Chikanaga (Sena Yoshihiro)
  - daughter married Otani Yoshihide

Preceded by Imagawa Yoshitada	7th Suruga-Imagawa family head 1476–1526	Succeeded by Imagawa Ujiteru
