= Imagawa Ujizane =

Japanese daimyō

- 今川 氏真
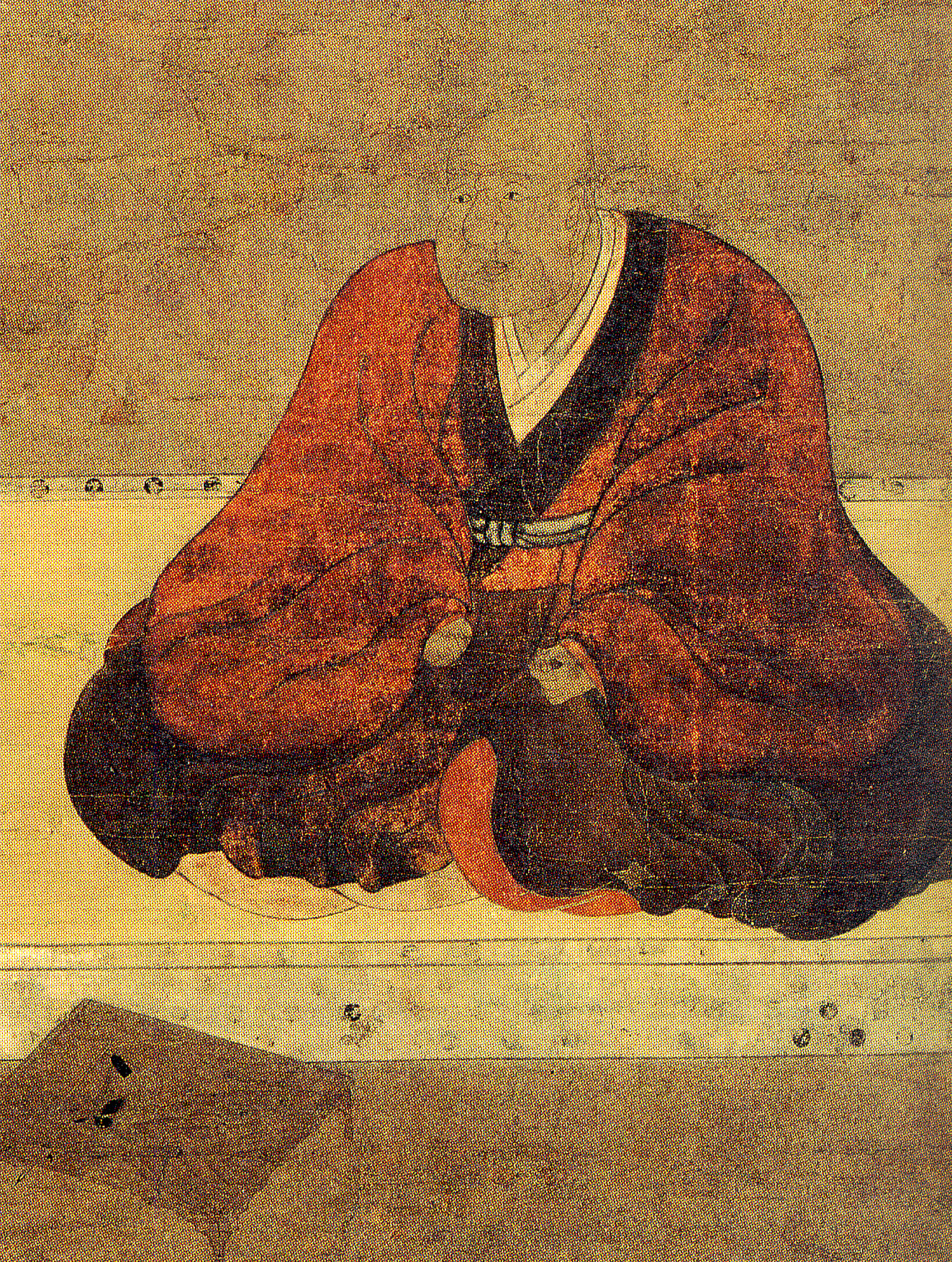

Head of Imagawa clan
- In office 1558–1615
- Preceded by: Imagawa Yoshimoto

Personal details
- Born: 1538 Sunpu Domain
- Died: January 27, 1615 (aged 76–77) Shinagawa
- Spouse: Lady Hayakawa
- Children: Imagawa Norimochi; Shinagawa Takahisa
- Parents: Imagawa Yoshimoto (father); Jōkei-in (mother)

Military service
- Allegiance: Imagawa clan Tokugawa clan Tokugawa Shogunate
- Rank: Kōke
- Battles/wars: Battle of Sunpu (1568); Siege of Kakegawa (1569); Battle of Nagashino (1575)

Imagawa Ujizane (今川 氏真; 1538 – January 27, 1615) was a Japanese daimyō who lived in the Sengoku period through the early Edo period. He was the tenth head of the Imagawa clan and was a son of Imagawa Yoshimoto and the father of Imagawa Norimochi and Shinagawa Takahisa.

== Biography ==
Ujizane was born in Sunpu Domain; he was the eldest son of Imagawa Yoshimoto. In 1554, he married the daughter of Hōjō Ujiyasu (Lady Hayakawa) as part of the Kai-Sagami-Suruga Alliance. Ujizane inherited family headship in 1558, when his father retired in order to focus his attention on the Imagawa advance into Tōtōmi and Mikawa Provinces. His childhood name was Tatsuomaru (龍王丸).

In 1560, Yoshimoto was killed in the Battle of Okehazama, the province of Totomi and Mikawa went into chaos. Ujizane succeeded his father, but due to the chaotic state of the Imagawa clan, many vassals betrayed Ujizane. His grandmother, Jukei-ni, who exercised great political power, died in 1568. Motivated by this, Takeda Shingen and Tokugawa Ieyasu attacked the lands of Imagawa.

Ujizane later retaliated against the landlocked Takeda clan with a salt embargo. This had little effect because Uesugi Kenshin took the opportunity to sell salt to the Takeda and only resulted in the downfall of the Imagawa clan.

In 1568, Shingen began his invasion into Suruga. The Imagawa army faced a debacle, and Sunpu Castle was quickly occupied. Later, Ujizane fled to Kakegawa Castle in Totomi Province.

After his defeat in the 1569 Siege of Kakegawa, Imagawa Ujizane allied himself with Ieyasu in return for help in recovering his territory in Suruga Province.

It is recorded in "Shincho Koki" (Account of Nobunaga) that in 1575, he had a conference with Oda Nobunaga and Tokugawa Ieyasu, at Sokoku-ji Temple. Also, he joined the army in the Battle of Nagashino against Takeda clan.

The Imagawa family was summoned by Tokugawa Ieyasu and made Tokugawa retainers, with the rank of kōke. Ujizane enjoyed playing Kemari and writing poetry. He died at the family estate in Shinagawa in 1615.

== Family ==
- Father: Imagawa Yoshimoto (1519–1560)
- Mother: Jōkei-in (1519–1550)
- Wife: Lady Hayakawa
- Concubine: Ihara Tadayasu's daughter
- Children:
  - Daughter married Kira Yoshisada by Lady Hayakawa
  - Imagawa Norimochi (1570–1608) by Lady Hayakawa
  - Shinagawa Takahisa by Lady Hayakawa
  - Nishio Yasunobu by Lady Hayakawa
  - son (澄存) by Lady Hayakawa

Preceded by Imagawa Yoshimoto	10th Suruga-Imagawa family head 1560–1569	Succeeded by Imagawa Naofusa
