= Imagawa Yoshimoto =

Japanese samurai and daimyo (1519–1560)

- 今川 義元
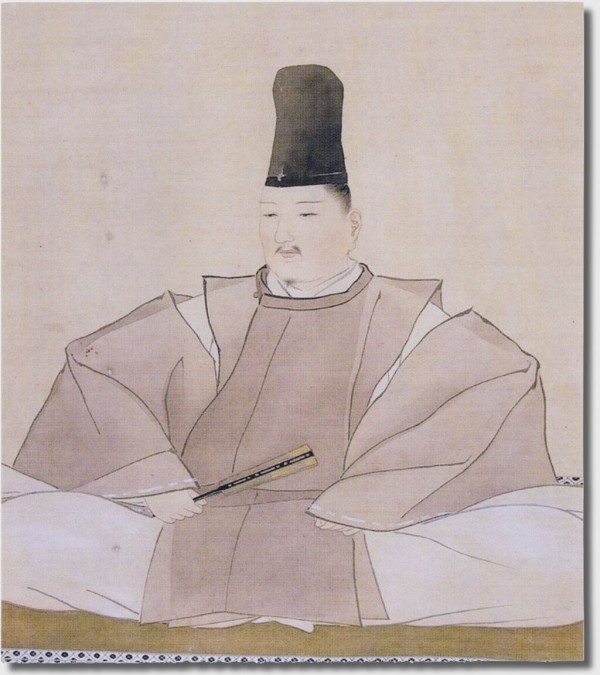

Head of Imagawa clan
- In office 1536–1560
- Preceded by: Imagawa Ujiteru
- Succeeded by: Imagawa Ujizane

Personal details
- Born: Yosakimaru; 1519 Sunpu, Suruga Province, Japan
- Died: June 12, 1560 (aged 40–41) Dengakuhazama, Owari Province, Japan
- Spouse: Jōkei-in
- Children: 5, including Imagawa Ujizane
- Parents: Imagawa Ujichika (father); Jukei-ni (mother)
- Relatives: Imagawa Ujiteru (brother); Hōjō Ujiyasu (brother-in-law); Takeda Shingen (brother-in-law); Lady Hayakawa (niece and daughter-in-law)

Military service
- Allegiance: Imagawa clan
- Rank: Daimyo
- Unit: Imagawa clan
- Commands: Sunpu Castle
- Battles/wars: Hanagura Disturbance (1536); Battle of Azukizaka (1542); Battle of Azukizaka (1548); Battle of Muraki Castle (1554); Battle of Okehazama (1560) †

Imagawa Yoshimoto (今川 義元; 1519 – June 12, 1560) was a Japanese samurai and daimyō (feudal lord) of the Sengoku period. Based in Suruga Province, he was known as The number one archer in the Tōkaidō (海道一の弓取り, Kaidō-ichi no Yumitori); (Note: This is not literally saying he was an excellent archer; it's a metaphor indicating he was the most militarily powerful daimyo in that area.) he was one of the three daimyō that dominated the Tōkaidō region. He died in 1560 while marching to Kyoto. He was killed in the village of Dengakuhazama in Okehazama by Oda Nobunaga.

== Early life and succession ==
Yoshimoto was born as in 1519, the third son of Imagawa Ujichika of the Imagawa clan, which claimed descent from Emperor Seiwa (850–880). His childhood name was Yosakimaru (芳菊丸). His family branched from Minamoto clan by the Ashikaga clan. As he was not the eldest son, he was not an heir to his father's lordship. As a result, the young boy was sent to a temple where his name was changed to Baigaku Shōhō (梅岳承芳) or Sengaku Shōhō (栴岳承芳).

In 1536, his older brother Ujiteru died suddenly, unleashing successional disputes. His elder half-brother, Genkō Etan (玄広恵探), tried to seize the lordship, but the clan split into two factions. Yoshimoto's faction argued he was the rightful heir because Yoshimoto's mother (Jukei-ni) was the consort of Ujichika. Genkō Etan's faction disputed this based on Genkō's seniority, and that his mother was a member of the Kushima family. However, with the assistance of Hojo Ujitsuna of Sagami province and support of Takeda Nobutora of Kai province, the Genkō faction was eliminated in the Hanagura Disturbance (花倉の乱, Hanagura-no-ran). Baigaku Shōhō changed his name to Yoshimoto at this point and succeeded the clan.

== Imagawa Campaigns ==
After Yoshimoto succeeded to family headship, he married the sister of Takeda Shingen of Kai. This allowed Yoshimoto to cement an alliance with the Takeda when he helped Shingen imprison his father, Takeda Nobutora, in 1540. Soon after, the Later Hōjō clan invaded into the Suruga province but Yoshimoto defeated the Hōjō's force.

In 1542, Yoshimoto began his advance into Mikawa Province, in an effort to fight the growing influence of Oda Nobuhide in that region, but was defeated in the 1542 Battle of Azukizaka.

Later in 1548, Yoshimoto defeated Nobuhide in the Second Battle of Azukizaka and continued to expand his territory until 1560. In campaigns over the course of the ensuing decades, Yoshimoto wrested control over the Suruga, Totomi, and Mikawa provinces.

In 1552, Shingen's son, Takeda Yoshinobu, married Yoshimoto's daughter. Yoshimoto and the Hōjō clan reached a peace agreement in 1554 with the marriage of Yoshimoto's son, Imagawa Ujizane, to the daughter of Hōjō Ujiyasu, Lady Hayakawa.

In 1554, the Imagawa clan came to the west and built the Muraki Castle in the southeast of Owari, besieging Mizuno Nobumoto (uncle of Tokugawa Ieyasu) in his castle of Ogawa, who defected from the Imagawa in favor of an alliance with Oda Nobunaga.

In 1558, Yoshimoto sent Matsudaira Motoyasu to attack Terabe Castle, but were driven off by reinforcements sent by Oda Nobunaga. Later, Yoshimoto left the clan's political affairs in Ujizane's hands, in order to focus on dealing with the advance westward into Mikawa and Owari.

== Death ==
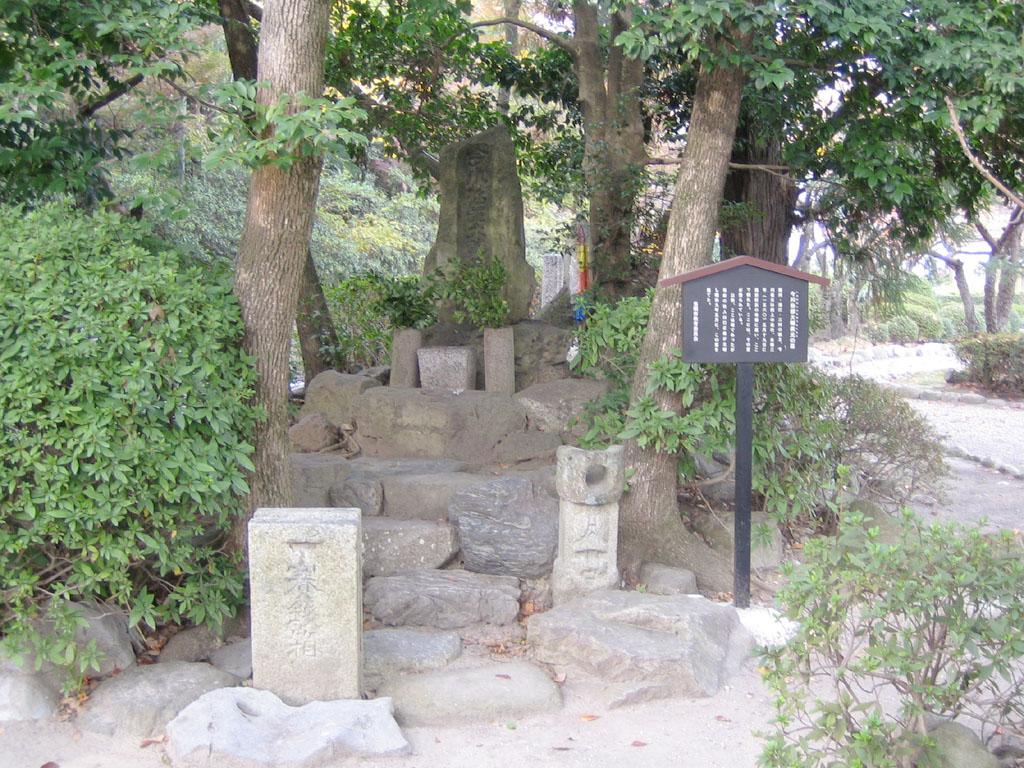
Imagawa Yoshimoto's grave at Okehazama

In the summer of 1560, after forming a three-way alliance with the Takeda and the Hōjō, Yoshimoto headed out to the capital with Matsudaira Motoyasu (later known as 'Tokugawa Ieyasu') of Mikawa in the vanguard. Despite having a strong force of 25,000, Yoshimoto deliberately announced that he had 40,000 troops. While this statement put fear in many factions, Oda Nobunaga was not dissuaded. (Some historical sources support the claim of 40,000.)

After capturing several castles from the Oda clan, Yoshimoto's army let its guard down, celebrating with song and sake. However, Oda Nobunaga launched a surprise attack with his army of 3,000 following a downpour and defeated Yoshimoto's army. Two Oda samurai (Mōri Shinsuke and Hattori Koheita) ambushed and killed Yoshimoto in the village of Dengakuhazama.

Ujizane succeeded to family headship after Yoshimoto's death, but the Imagawa clan fell from power. Ujizane was later summoned by Tokugawa Ieyasu and became a kōke in the administration of the Tokugawa clan. Yoshimoto's niece was Lady Tsukiyama, the wife of Tokugawa Ieyasu.

Yoshimoto has several graves; his body itself is buried at Daisei-ji, a temple in the city of Toyokawa in modern Aichi Prefecture.

== Notable retainers ==
- Sessai Chōrō
- Matsui Munenobu
- Matsudaira Hirotada
- Iio Noritsura
- Ii Naomori
- Okabe Motonobu
- Udono Nagateru

== Family ==
- Father: Imagawa Ujichika
- Mother: Jukei-ni (d. 1568).
- Wife: Jōkei-in (1519–1550)
- Concubine: Ii Naohira's daughter
- Children:
  - Imagawa Ujizane by Jōkei-in
  - Chotoku Ichigetsu (d. 1625) by Jōkei-in
  - Reishō-in (d. 1612) married Takeda Yoshinobu by Jōkei-in
  - Daughter (隆福院)
  - daughter married Mure Katsushige

Preceded by Imagawa Ujiteru	11th Suruga-Imagawa family head 1536–1560	Succeeded by Imagawa Ujizane

== Appearances in popular fiction ==
See People of the Sengoku period in popular culture.

- He is a playable character in Pokémon Conquest (Pokémon + Nobunaga's Ambition in Japan), with his partner Pokémon being Pineco and Forretress.
- In the Samurai Warriors series, Yoshimoto is represented as a foolish old-fashioned nobleman. His weapon is a kemari which is inspired by his son, Ujizane's historical obsession towards kemari. In Samurai Warriors 5, however, where he fights with a warhammer and his ancestral katana Samonji, he is instead portrayed as an arrogant but effective leader who is a persistent threat to the young Oda Nobunaga, even defeating him in combat in one battle and forcing the Oda army to withdraw, before his eventual defeat at Okehazama.
- A female version of Yoshimoto appears in anime The Ambition of Oda Nobuna. In this version, instead of dying Yoshimoto is spared and later installed as a figurehead Shōgun to legitimize Nobuna's claim to Kyoto.
- In the Sengoku Basara game and anime series, he was shown to be a weak leader, using his vassals as decoys while trying to retreat. In anime version, he was killed by Oda Nobunaga.
- He's a Boss in the Historical fiction Action-RPG Nioh 2 where he's defeated by the player character "Hide", a fictional son/daughter (chosen by the player) of Saito Dosan that serves Nobunaga throughout his rise and fall.
- In S03E02 of "Baki", he is shown as the creator of the poison hands technique.
