= Ii Naomasa =

Japanese samurai general and daimyō (1561–1602)

Junior Third Rank Ii Naomasa
- 井伊 直政
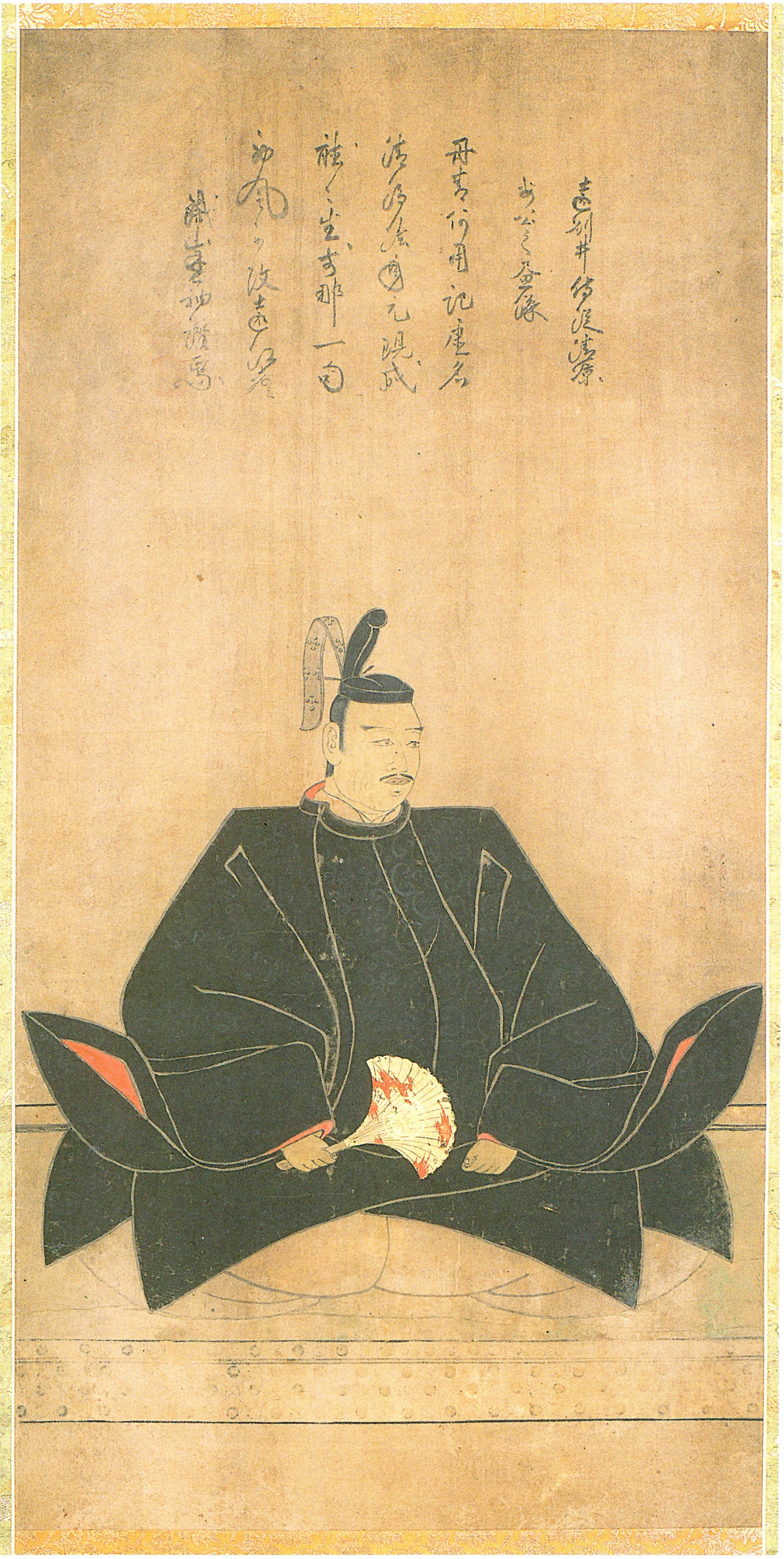

Head of Ii clan
- In office 1582–1602
- Preceded by: Ii Naotora
- Succeeded by: Ii Naokatsu

Daimyō of Sawayama
- In office 1600–1600
- Preceded by: Ishida Mitsunari

Daimyō of Takasaki
- In office 1590–1600
- Succeeded by: Sakai Ietsugu

Daimyō of Hikone
- In office 1600–1602
- Succeeded by: Ii Naokatsu

Personal details
- Born: March 4, 1561 Tōtōmi Province, Japan
- Died: March 24, 1602 (aged 41) Sawayama Castle, Ōmi Province, Japan
- Spouse: Tobai-in
- Parent: Ii Naochika (father)
- Relatives: Matsudaira Yasuchika (father-in-law); Tokugawa Ieyasu (father-in-law)
- Nickname(s): Aka-oni; Hitokiri-Hyōbu

Military service
- Allegiance: Tokugawa clan Eastern Army; Tokugawa shogunate
- Rank: Buke Shitsuyaku; Jijū; Hyōbu-daifū / Shūri-dayū
- Unit: Ii clan Red Guard brigade (赤備え)
- Battles/wars: Campaign against Takeda clan (1576-1581); Battle of Shibahara (1576); Siege of Tanaka castle (1581); Siege of Takatenjin (1581); Journey in Iga (1582; Tenshō-Jingo war (1582); Battle of Wakamiko; Battle of Kurokoma; Tokugawa-Toyotomi conflict (1584); Battle of Komaki and Nagakute; Siege of Kanie Castle; Siege of Ueda castle (1585); Siege of Tanaka castle (1587); Odawara Campaign; Siege of Odawara castle; Wagai-Hienuki rebellion (1590-1); Kunohe rebellion (1591); Sekigahara Campaign (1600); Battle of Takegahana castle; Battle of Gifu Castle; Battle of Sekigahara

Ii Naomasa (井伊 直政; March 4, 1561 – March 24, 1602) was a Japanese samurai general and daimyo under the Sengoku period daimyō, and later shōgun, Tokugawa Ieyasu. He led the clan after the death of Ii Naotora. He married Tobai-in, Matsudaira Yasuchika's daughter and adopted daughter of Tokugawa Ieyasu.

Ii Naomasa joined the ranks of the Tokugawa clan in the mid-1570s, rising swiftly through the ranks and became particularly famous after the Battle of Komaki and Nagakute, as he is recognized as one of the Four Guardians of the Tokugawa along with Honda Tadakatsu, Sakakibara Yasumasa, and Sakai Tadatsugu. Ii Naomasa then eventually became the master of a sizable holding in Ōmi Province, following the Battle of Sekigahara in 1600.

His office in the Imperial Japan ministries was Hyōbu-daifū. (Note: ^ A copy of the oral decree dated February 27, Tensho 12, states that "Hyobu Daifu FUJIWARA Naomasa" was appointed Shuri-Daifu.)

Ii Naomasa was also notable for his command over elite troops Red Guards (赤備え) (akazonae) that formerly served the Takeda clan.

== Biography ==
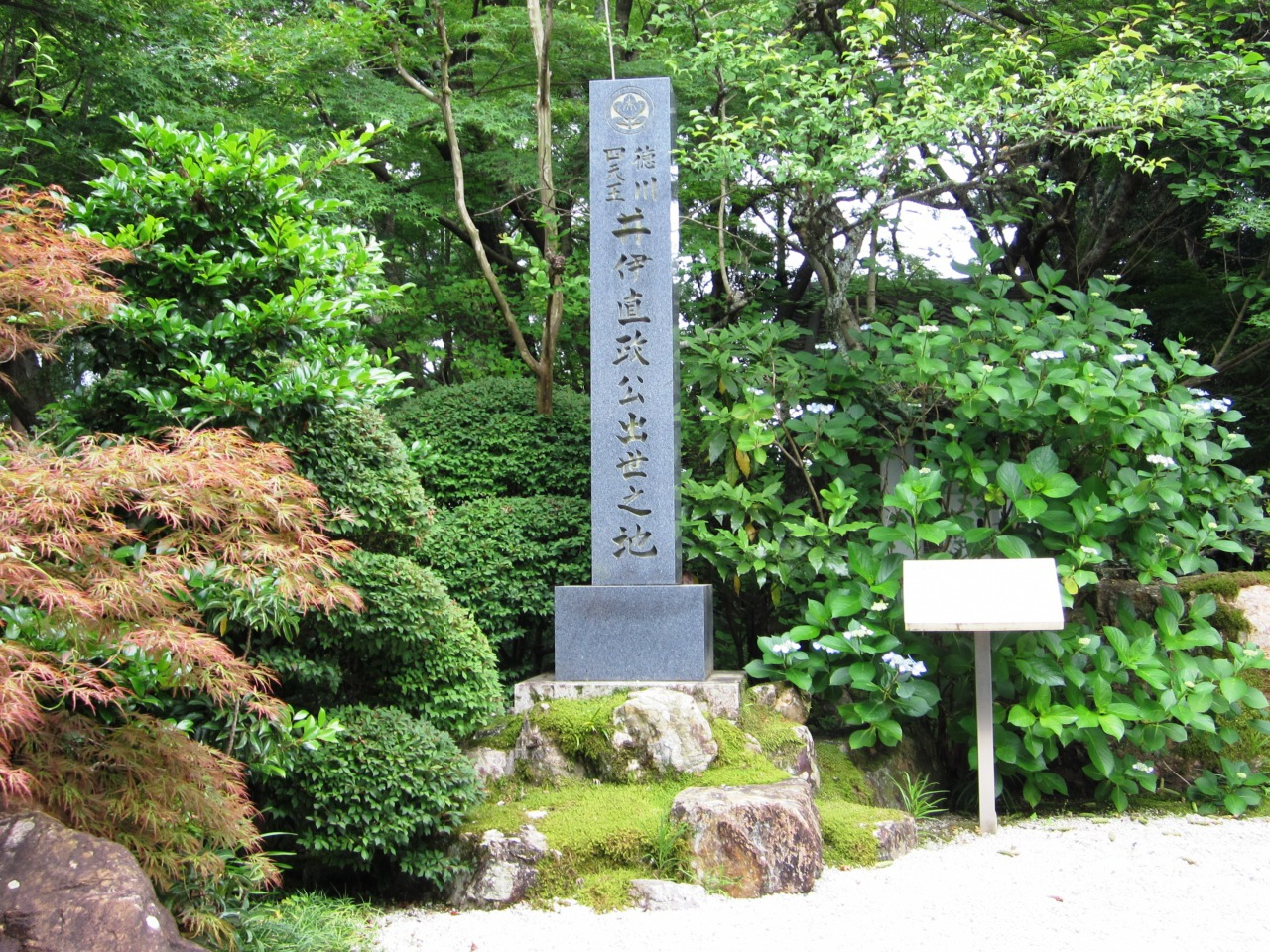
Monument to the birthplace of Ii Naomasa, Ryutanji Temple, Inasa-cho, Hamamatsu City, Shizuoka Prefecture

Ii Naomasa was born in Hōda Village of Tōtōmi Province. His childhood name was Toramatsu (虎松), later Manchiyo (万千代). His family, like the Tokugawa, had originally been retainers of the Imagawa clan, but following the death of the clan's leader, Imagawa Yoshimoto, in the Battle of Okehazama (1560), confusion and general chaos ensued. Naomasa's father, Ii Naochika, was falsely convicted of treason by Yoshimoto's paranoid successor, Imagawa Ujizane, and was subsequently killed. (Note: In recent years, there has been a theory that after Ii Naomori's death in battle, the Ii domain came under the direct control of the Imagawa clan because Naomori only had a daughter (Naotora). According to this theory, Naochika was a member of the Ii clan but not the head of the family, and it is possible that his assassination by Imagawa Ujizane was not a fact..)

Location of Iinoya domain and Hamamatsu castle

Naomasa, then a very small child, escaped his danger. After many difficulties, Ii Naotora succeeded the Ii clan and become the guardian of Naomasa. According to "Ii family biography, In 1574 Naomasa came to Ryutanji Temple for the 13th anniversary of Naochika's death. Then Naotora and Ryutanji Temple Chief Priest Nankei Zuimon, who also happen to be Naomasa's great uncle, consulted and tried to make Naomasa serve Tokugawa Ieyasu. First, in order to prevent Toramatsu from returning to Horai-ji Temple, Hiyo married Kiyokage Matsushita, a vassal of the Tokugawa clan, and adopted Toramatsu into the Matsushita clan. It was said the house of Ii clan invested greatly in Naomasa's education in preparation to entrust him to Ieyasu as a bid to save the Ii clan from crisis.

In 1575, Toramatsu was discovered by Ieyasu and allowed to return to the Ii clan, and changed his name to Manchiyo. Furthermore, he was granted possession of Iinoya in Shizuoka, former territory of Ii clan, and was appointed as a page of Tokugawa Ieyasu after visiting him in Hamamatsu Castle. At that time, there are three influential clans in Iinoya which led by the so-called "Iinoya trio", consisted of Suzuki Shigetoki, Kondō Yasumochi, and Suganuma Tadahisa. which joined the Tokugawa clan's rank after Ieyasu's invasion of Totomi in 1568. As they entered service under Ieyasu, they were placed by Ieyasu under The command of Naomasa. (Note: According to Kan'ei family genealogy, and Samurai history book record compiled by the Ii clan, the governance of the whole Iinoya domain were placed under Naomasa. However, historical materials regarding the territory of Iinoya suggest that the Iinoya trio held Chigyochi as before, while Naomasa's territory was established in a way that was separate from them.)

=== War against Takeda & Hōjō clan ===
In 1576, Naomasa fought for the first time in the battle against Takeda Katsuyori's forces at Shibahara (芝原) in Tōtōmi Province. Later Naomasa was seen alongside Ieyasu's Hatamoto vanguards, alongside Honda Tadakatsu and Sakakibara Yasumasa. At the age of 18, Naomasa participated in the Tokugawa army attack on Tanaka castle which guarded by Takeda clan general named Ichijō Nobutatsu. In this battle, Naomasa fought together with Matsudaira Ietada, Sakakibara Yasumasa, and Honda Tadakatsu as they all climbed to Tanaka castle wall and fighting Nobutatsu's soldiers.

In 1578, at the age of 18, Naomasa was given control of 10,000 koku of domain, due to unspecified distinguished military merit during that year. Later, Arthur Lindsay Sadler wrote that At the age of 19, Naomasa gained attention for his first notable performance in battle.

In 1580, at the age of 20, he was given domain worth of 20,000 koku. It was noted that in the past, when the Ii clan fell into decline, its vassals abandoned and hid in the mountains, but with Naomasa's rise in power, they began to return one after another. The Ii clan records that "Nakano Echigo-no-kami, Okuyama Rokurozaemon, and other long-time vassals of the Ii clan had fled to the mountains, but they all came down to serve Naomasa.". In another case, Okuyama Rokurozaemon's younger brother, Sokan, whi had retired and become a monk, was ordered by Naomasa to return to secular life and was granted 1,000 koku to manage..

Later, at the age of 22, Naomasa performed another distinguishing military service against the Takeda clan, at Siege of Takatenjin in 1581. It was said that during this period, Naomasa gained Ieyasu's favor due to his blood relation with Lady Tsukiyama, Ieyasu's legal wife.

In 1582, after the Honnoji Incident, Naomasa accompanied Ieyasu on an arduous journey to escape the enemies of Nobunaga in Sakai and return to Mikawa. However, their journey was very dangerous due to the existence of "Ochimusha-gari" groups across the route. (Note: According to Imatani Akira, professor of Tsuru University, and Ishikawa Tadashi, assistant professor University of Central Florida, during Sengoku period there are emergence of particularly dangerous groups called "Ochimusha-gari" or "fallen warrior hunt" groups. these groups were decentralized peasant or Rōnin self-defense forces who operates outside the law, while in actuality they often resorted to hunt Samurais or soldiers who has been defeated in wars.) During this journey, Naomasa and other senior Ieyasu retainers such as Sakai Tadatsugu and Honda Tadakatsu fought their way through raids and harassment from Ochimusha-gari (Samurai hunter) outlaws during their march escorting Ieyasu, and sometimes advancing by usage of gold and silver bribes given to some of the more amenable Ochimusha-gari groups. As they reached Kada, an area between Kameyama town and Iga, the attacks from Ochimusha-gari finally ended as they reached the territory of Kōka ikki Jizamurai warriors who were friendly to the Tokugawa clan. The Koka ikki warriors then escorted the group while assisting them by eliminating the threats of the Ochimusha-gari outlaws until they reached Iga Province, where they were further protected by samurai clans from Iga ikki which then accompanied the Ieyasu group until they safely reached Mikawa. The Ietada nikki journal has recorded that the escorts of Ieyasu suffered around 200 casualties and only 34 people were left when they finally arrived at Ietada's residence in Mikawa.

After Ieyasu's return to Mikawa, Tenshō-Jingo War broke out between the Tokugawa clan and Hōjō clan in a contest to gain control the area of Shinano Province, Ueno region, and Kai Province Kai Province (currently Gunma Prefecture), which had been vacant since the destruction of Takeda clan and the death of Oda Nobunaga. Ieyasu lead an army of 8,000 soldiers entering Kai, Shinano Province, and Ueno, to annex it. However, the Hōjō clan in the Kantō region also led an army of 55,000 men and crossed the Usui Pass to invade Shinano Province. In the battle of Wakamiko, 8,000 Tokugawa soldiers fought against around 50,000 soldiers of Hojo soldiers led by Hōjō Ujinao. Ii Naomasa was recorded as participating in these engagements. In the middle of this conflict, Naomasa further managed to recruit more samurais that had formerly served various Takeda generals such as Ichijō Nobutatsu, Yamagata Masakage, Masatsune Tsuchiya, and Hara Masatane with the help of former Takeda clan retainer named Kimata Morikatsu who organized the contacts of those samurais with Naomasa. Aside from military service, Naomasa played diplomatic role during this conflict as he received around 41 letters from many former Takeda clan's vassals to submit to Ieyasu. In total, more than 800 vassals of Takeda clan from Kofu Province recruited by Ieyasu during the fight against the Hōjō which lasted for 80 days. In the final phase of this conflict, Naomasa participated in the battle of Kurokoma, where the smaller Tokugawa army managed to defeat the much larger Hōjō armies, despite being reinforced by 10,000 soldiers by Satomi clan from Awa Province (Chiba). From November to January of the following year, Naomasa worked together with another Tokugawa general Torii Mototada, and two former Takeda clan generals who now joined Tokugawa clan's rank, Hoshina Masanao and Suwa Yoritada, to attack Chikuma District which was controlled by a Hōjō clan vassal named Ogasawara Sadayoshi. By February 10, Sadayoshi surrendered and joined the Tokugawa side. The result of this war, combined with the defection of Sanada Masayuki to the Tokugawa side has forced the Hōjō clan to negotiate truce with Ieyasu. The Hōjō clan then sent Hōjō Ujinobu as its representative, while the Tokugawa sent Naomasa as its representative to negotiate the peace conditions.

According to the Meishō genkō-roku record, after the conflict with the Hōjō clan, Ieyasu organized a kishōmon(blood oath) with many samurai clans that formerly were vassals of the Takeda clan assigned under the command of Tokugawa clan retainers. Ieyasu Tokugawa planned to subduct the largest portions of former Takeda samurai under Naomasa's command, having consulted and reached agreement with Sakai Tadatsugu, a senior Tokugawa clan vassal. However, Ieyasu's decision garnered protest from Sakakibara Yasumasa, who went so far as to threaten Naomasa. Tadatsugu immediately defended the decision of Ieyasu in response and warned Yasumasa that if he did any harm to Naomasa, Tadatsugu would personally slaughter the Sakakibara clan; thus, Yasumasa heeded Tadatsugu and did not protest further. Then Ieyasu decided assigned 70 members of former Takeda samurais from Tsuchiya clan under the command of Ii Naomasa. During this year, Naomasa was also given an increase of his domain to 40,000 koku. (Note: moToshikazu Komiyama expressed doubt about the number, as 40,000 sum of koku are quite large for Naomasa to held alone during that moment, while it is implied from other historical records that it was actually the total of domains which held by semi independent vassals of Naomasa.)

Later in 1583, Naomasa sent a detachment of former Takeda samurai who originated from Kai, and were led by his subordinate, Kimata Morikatsu, to invade the Takatō area of Shinano province and subdue an area there which had still not submitted to the Tokugawa clan.

=== Campaign of Komaki-Nagakute ===
In 1584 on April 9, during the Battle of Nagakute, Naomasa was entrusted to lead around 3,000 soldiers on the left wing of the Tokugawa forces formation. On the opposing side, Ikeda Tsuneoki and Mori Nagayoshi commanded 3,000 and 2,000 soldiers respectively. At around 10 a.m., Naomasa clashed against the troops of Tsuneoki. The battle lasted over two hours, as Naomasa units repeatedly foiled attempted charges towards his position by Tsuneoki and Mori Nagayoshi troops with musket rifle barrages, until Nagayoshi was shot and killed in action, causing the Tokugawa forces to gain the upper hand amid the chaos. Tsuneoki was also killed by Nagai Naokatsu's spear and died in battle. (Note: It was said that Andō Naotsugu who killed both Nagayoshi and Ikeda Tsuneoki. However, it is recorded Ando let others to claim the head of Tsuneoki.) Motosuke Ikeda was also killed by Andō Naotsugu. Meanwhile Ikeda Terumasa retreated from the battlefield. Eventually, the Tsuneoki and Mori forces were crushed, and the battle ended in victory for the Tokugawa force. In this battle, Naomasa fought so valiantly that it elicited praise from Toyotomi Hideyoshi, who was on the opposing side.

After the Battle of Komaki and Nagakute, the front line in northern Owari reached a stalemate. Ieyasu and Oda Nobukatsu led 20,000 soldiers and besieged three castles: Kanie Castle, Maeda Castle, and Shimoichiba Castle. The Kanie castle was defended by Maeda Nagatane and Takigawa Kazumasu. Tadatsugu, Okanabe Mori, and Yamaguchi Shigemasa spearheaded the attack towards Shimoichiba castle. On June 22, Nobukatsu and Ieyasu launched an all-out attack on Kanie Castle. The soldiers were led by Tadatsugu, While Naomasa, Ishikawa Kazumasa, Honda Tadakatsu, Sakakibara Yasumasa, and Matsudaira Ietada were deployed in reserve before entering the battle with Ieyasu himself. On June 23, Ieyasu entered the castle with Sakakibara Yasumasa, thus the castle was subdued.

=== Service under Toyotomi government ===
Following the peace negotiation between Ieyasu and Hideyoshi, Hideyoshi's mother, Ōmandokoro, was sent to stay with Naomasa in gentle captivity, cementing an alliance between the Tokugawa and the Toyotomi. It was reported that Hideyoshi was satisfied with Naomasa's work while guarding his mother.

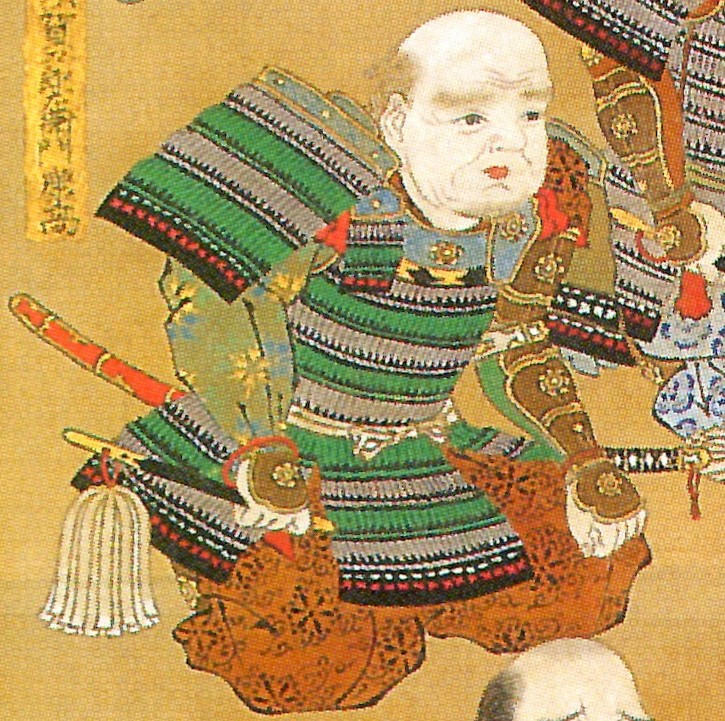
Osuga Yasutaka, senior Tokugawa general

In 1585, during the Tokugawa clan's first siege of Ueda Castle against Sanada Masayuki, Ii Naomasa led 5,000 soldiers along with Osuga Yasutaka and Matsudaira Yasushige led reinforcements to cover the retreat of Tokugawa forces after they failed to pacify the castle due to hostile movements from Uesugi Kagekatsu. In the same year, Ishikawa Kazumasa, a senior vassal of Tokugawa, defected from Ieyasu to Hideyoshi. This incident caused Ieyasu to undertake a massive reform of the structures of the Tokugawa clan's military government. At first, Ieyasu ordered Torii Mototada, who served as the county magistrate of Kai, to collect military laws, weapons, and military equipment from the time of Takeda Shingen and bring them to Hamamatsu Castle (Hamamatsu City, Shizuoka Prefecture). Later, he also appointed two former Takeda vassals, Naruse Masakazu and Okabe Masatsuna, as magistrates under authority of Ii Naomasa and Honda Tadakatsu, while he also ordered all of former Takeda vassals who now serve him to impart any military doctrines and structures they knew during their service under Takeda clan, and lastly, he ordered the three of his prime generals, the so-called "Tokugawa Four Heavenly Kings," Ii Naomasa, Honda Tadakatsu, and Sakakibara Yasumasa, to serve as supreme commander of this new military regiments.

In 1586, according to "Sakakibara clan historical records", Ieyasu sent Naomasa, Honda Tadakatsu, and Sakakibara Yasumasa as representatives to Kyoto, where the three of them were regarded as "Tokugawa Sanketsu"(Three great nobles of Tokugawa). Then in following month, the three of them were joined by Sakai Tadatsugu to accompany Ieyasu in his personal trip to Kyoto, where the four of them "became famous". (Note: However, Murayama did not mention the sobriquet of "Four Guardians" here. He only mention that those four Tokugawa generals "became famous)

In 1587, during the campaign of Toyotomi Hideyoshi against the Ikkō-ikki rebel armies, the Tokugawa clan were involved in the battle of Tanaka castle in Fujieda, Shizuoka.

In 1588, during a visit of the Tokugawa clan to pay respect to Toyotomi Hideyoshi, Naomasa was appointed to the rank of Jijū (equivalent of English Chamberlain office), and became the highest-ranking senior vassal in the Tokugawa family. This made Naomasa outrank even the most senior of Tokugawa's officers such as Sakai Tadatsugu. (Note: Noda Hiroko, member of Hikone castle museum directorate, has suspected that this is due to Naomasa being hailed from Ii clan, which status has Similar prestige with the Tokugawa clan themselves. Another reason was because Naomasa himself was a relative of Lady Tsukiyama.。)

in 1590 May, Naomasa participated with the Toyotomi forces during the campaign against the Hōjō clan. Later, when Minowa Castle surrendered without a fight, it was awarded to Ii Naomasa as its castellan. Naomasa significantly expanded the castle and dug deep and wide dry moats and replaced earthen ramparts with stone walls along the main route into the castle. The siege of Odawara, as the last Hōjō clan stronghold, nearly saw no significant military action, with the exception of Naomasa's night raid attack. This happened after a group of miners from Kai Province dug under the castle walls, allowing men under Ii Naomasa's command to enter and engage the enemy. It was recorded by Miura Joshin, a Hojo samurai and poet who also participated in this conflict; that Naomasa's unit managed to kill 400 Hojo soldiers.

After the surrender of the Hōjō clan, Ieyasu sent Naomasa and Sakakibara Yasumasa with 1,500 soldiers to witness the Seppuku suicide ritual procession of the defeated enemy generals, Hōjō Ujimasa and Hōjō Ujiteru. As result of his meritorious service during this campaign, Naomasa was awarded with an increase of domain stipends to 120,000 Koku.

=== Rebels suppression campaign (1590-1591) ===
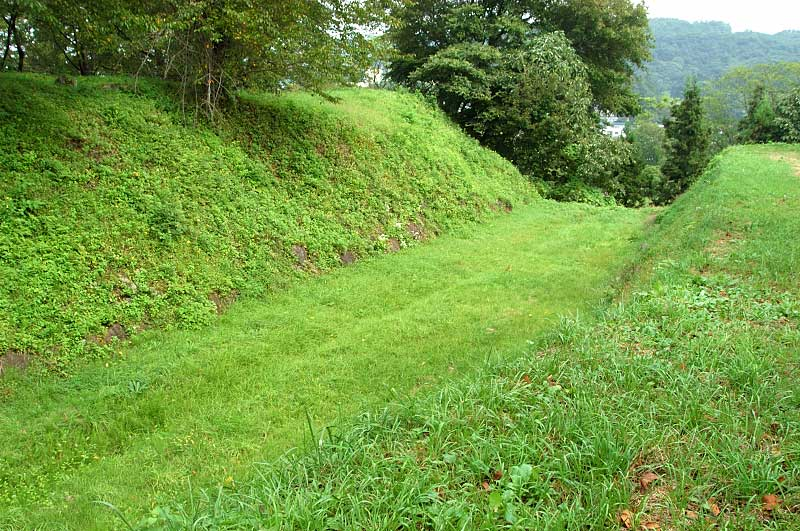
Remnant of Kunohe castle's dry moat

Later in October 28 of the same year, a massive rebellion against the Toyotomi government in Mutsu Province which was incited by Hienuki Hirotada and Waga Yoshitada broke out. In response, Hideyoshi sent a punitive expedition with 30,000 army in strength led by Ieyasu Tokugawa, Toyotomi Hidetsugu, Date Masamune, Ishida Mitsunari, Ōtani Yoshitsugu, Gamō Ujisato, Uesugi Kagekatsu, Satake Yoshishige, and Maeda Toshiie, in order to pacify those rebellions. Naomasa who participated in this expedition brought in his "Red Demons" unit as vanguard of Tokugawa forces.

Subsequently, with the Waga-Hienuki rebellion, the Kunohe rebellion also broke out in March 13, 1591. This caused the punitive expedition army to take the measure of splitting their forces as Ieyasu, Naomasa, Ujisato, and some commanders now changed their focus to suppress Masazane's rebellion first. Naomasa also brought some veteran vassals such as Kondō Hideyo here. During the operation against the Kunohe clan rebels, Naomasa Ii became the vanguard with Nanbu Nobunao. As they advanced towards Kunohe castle, they faced a small force of Kunohe rebels which they easily defeated. As they approached the Kunohe castle, Naomasa suggested to the other commanders to besiege Kunohe's castle until they surrender, which met with agreement from them. As the operation commenced, Naomasa became part of the army who besieged Kunohe castle, where he and Asano Nagamasa deployed on the east side across the Nekobuchi River. On 4 September, the rebels executed the prisoners inside the castle and committed mass suicide after setting a fire which burned the castle for three days and three nights and killed all within. After the Kunohe clan was suppressed, Naomasa's detachment then rejoined the main expedition army with Mitsunari, Asano Nagamasa, and others to finish the operation to pacify the Hienuki and Waga clans, as Naomasa marched across Mutsu and Dewa Province subduing the resistances and capturing castles from Waga and Hienuki's allies during his journey.

The rebellions were finally suppressed by June 20 with Waga Yoshitada being slain in battle, while Hienuki Hirotada was sentenced to "Kaieki law" which stated that he and his clan's status and rights as samurai were stripped.

=== Sekigahara campaign & its aftermath ===
In 1598 after Hideyoshi died, political strife occurred between Ieyasu and the other Toyotomi clan's regents. Naomasa undertook political initiatives as he built a relationship with Kuroda Yoshitaka and Kuroda Nagamasa and formed a pact. through the Kuroda clan, Naomasa successfully swayed the other military commanders to support the Tokugawa clan. Aside from the Kuroda clan, according to a letter of Naomasa which is preserved in modern-day Hikone Castle Museum, Naomasa also engaged in correspondence with Sanada Nobuyuki to gain his support for the Tokugawa clan in response to a predicted incoming conflict between Ieyasu and his political enemies. In the same year, Naomasa also built Takasaki Castle and relocated his seat there. Minowa Castle was abandoned and allowed to fall into ruin.

In 1600, on the eve of the Sekigahara campaign, Naomasa led the forces in the Tokaido area together with Honda Tadakatsu, and played a central role as Ieyasu's representative. The troops of Naomasa were reinforced with a detachment of Kugai Masatoshiwho was a vassal of Tokugawa Hidetada who was himself at that moment still busy in the Siege of Ueda castle.

On August 21, The Eastern army's alliance, which sided with Ieyasu Tokugawa, attacked Takegahana castle which was defended by Oda Hidenobu, who had sided with Mitsunari's faction. They split themselves into two groups, where 18,000 soldiers led by Ikeda Terumasa and Asano Yoshinaga went to the river crossing, while 16,000 soldiers led by Naomasa, Fukushima Masanori, Hosokawa Tadaoki, Kyogoku Kochi, Kuroda Nagamasa, Katō Yoshiaki, Tōdō Takatora, Tanaka Yoshimasa, and Honda Tadakatsu went downstream to Ichinomiya. The first group led by Terumasa crossed the Kiso River and engaged in a battle at Yoneno, causing the Hidenobu army to be routed. On the other hand, Takegahana castle was reinforced by a Western army faction's general named Sugiura Shigekatsu. The Eastern army led by Naomasa and Fukushima crossed the river and directly attacked Takegahana Castle at 9:00 AM on the August 22nd. Shigekatsu himself set the castle on fire and committed suicide as a final act of defiance.

On September 24, Ieyasu demanded Naomasa quickly pacify Gifu castle, as they needed to move fast to rescue other feudal lords who had sided with Ieyasu, such as Katō Sadayasu and Takenaka Shigekado, and whose positions were being besieged by Mitsunari's Western army. (Note: The Gifu Sekigahara Battlefield Memorial Museum has preserved Ieyasu's letters including one which Ieyasu threaten Naomasa to complete the siege as fast as possible.) On September 29, Naomasa and Honda Tadakatsu led their army to rendezvous with Ikeda Terumasa's army, where they engaged Oda Hidenobu army in the Battle of Gifu Castle. In this battle, Hidenobu's castle was deprived of the expected support from Ishikawa Sadakiyo (石川貞清), who decided to not help the Western army in this war after he made an agreement with Naomasa. Hidenobu was prepared to commit seppuku, but was persuaded by Ikeda Terumasa and others to surrender to the eastern forces, and the Gifu Castle fell.

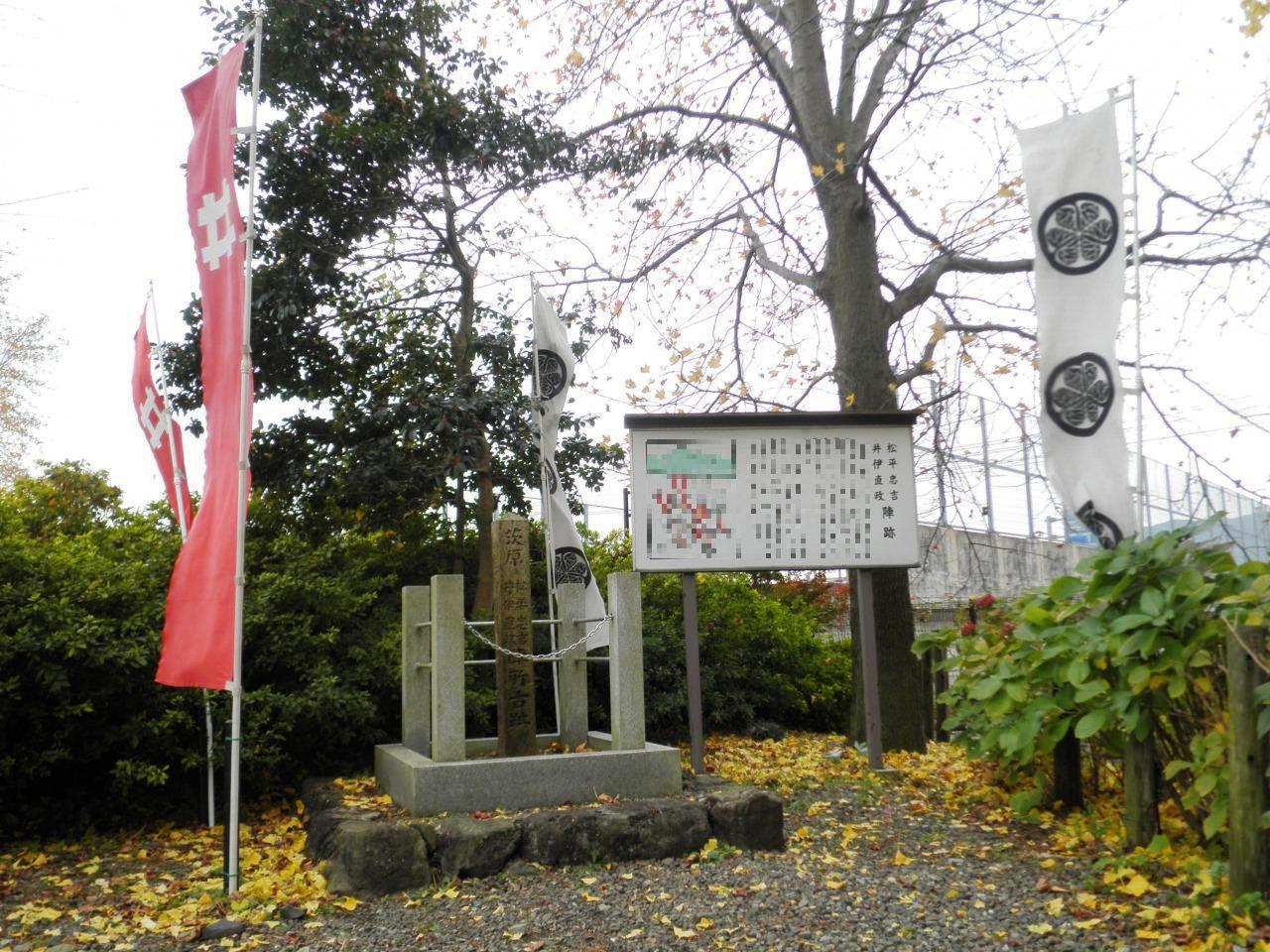
Site of Matsudaira Tadayoshi and Ii Naomasa's Positions in the Sekigahara battle.

On October 21, in the Battle of Sekigahara, Naomasa gave a notable performance where his unit outpaced those of other generals such as Fukushima Masanori, drawing the "first blood", where Naomasa led 30 spearmen from the center of the formation and charged the ranks of the western army, and then he was followed by Masanori whose units started clashing against Ukita Hideie units. However, some modern historians now view Naomasa's actions as a result of confusion on both sides as there was heavy fog covering the battlefield, and this may have caused him to unintentionally start the first clash against the enemy, which broke Ieyasu's previous order to let Masanori perform the first move of the battle. Meanwhile, Professor Watanabe Daimon offered an explanation that by many indications according to the battle records, the assignment of Naomasa as Ichiban-yari or the first unit to charge the enemy were already settled before the battle, where Masanori had agreed with Naomasa's intention to lead the first attack. Daimon argued that as Naomasa was appointed by Ieyasu supreme field commander, Naomasa was responsible for all commands and strategies during the clash in Sekigahara. As the battle entered its final phase, Naomasa turned his attention towards the Shimazu troops. However, Naomasa was shot and wounded by a stray bullet during his attempt to pursue Shimazu Yoshihiro. In the end Yoshihiro escaped, although in the process Naomasa's troops managed to kill Yoshihiro's nephew Shimazu Toyohisa.

After the Sekigahara battle, Naomasa sought pardons with Ieyasu for Sanada Masayuki and Sanada Yukimura at the behest of Sanada Nobuyuki. Naomasa also had his fief increased from 60,000 koku into 180,000 koku. Naomasa complained of this to Nagai Naokatsu, as he considered it small when compared to Ikeda Terumasa who received 520,000 Koku. It is recorded by Arthur Lindsay Sadler that Naomasa and Honda Tadakatsu expressed dissatisfaction of their rewards to Ieyasu.

Hikone castle which under control of Ii clan since Ii Naomasa

After defeating the Western Army at Sekigahara, Ieyasu dispatched his army to attack Sawayama Castle in Ōmi Province, the former territory of Ishida Mitsunari with Kobayakawa Hideaki's troops at the vanguard. Most of the castle's troops were at the Battle of Sekigahara, leaving the castle's garrison at 2,800 men. Despite the absence of the lord of the castle, the castle's soldiers fought well, but eventually some soldiers such as Moritmo Hasegawa betrayed the castle and opened the castle for the besieging army. most of Mitsunari relatives, including his father Masatsugu, Masazumi, and Kagetsuin (Mitsunari's wife), were killed in battle or committed suicide. After the castle fell in 1601, Naomasa was appointed to take control of Sawayama Castle, However, as the castle was viewed as unstrategic in location, Naomasa ordered the castle building along with its structures dismantled, while transferring its materials instead to Kohei castle, another castle which was controlled by Naomasa. (Note: However, modern era Japanese castle archaeologist Yoshimasa Miike theorized that the reason why Naomasa dismantled Sawayama castle and relocate its materials to Hikone was due to his concern that he could not secure the loyalty of the former Mitsunari vassals which reside in Sawayama castle.) He also was appointed to the rank of Junior Fourth Rank.

Several months after the battle in Sekigahara, Naomasa sent military reinforcements to assist Yamauchi Kazutoyo in pacifying the rebellion in Tosa Domain against retainers of Chōsokabe clan, and the Ichiryo Gusoku peasant army. The wound which was suffered by Naomasa at Sekigahara prevented his personal involvement in the quelling of the last vestiges of the anti-Tokugawa faction. Naomasa sent his vassal, Suzuki Hyōe, with force as strong as 8 ships to help Kazutoyo, which finally pacified the area in 5 weeks, after killing about 273 enemies. The 273 dead rebels heads were decapitated and sent to Ii Naomasa.

=== Death ===
Ii Naomasa's premature death in 1602 has been widely blamed on the wound he received at Sekigahara. Naomasa was highly regarded by Tokugawa Ieyasu, so it is no surprise that his sons Naotsugu and Naotaka succeeded him in his service and title. However, Naotsugu managed to anger Ieyasu by refusing to take part in his campaign to reduce the Toyotomi clan stronghold at Osaka.

In 1917, Naomasa was posthumously granted the courtesy title of junior third rank (ju san-mi, 従三位) by Emperor Taishō.

== Personality ==
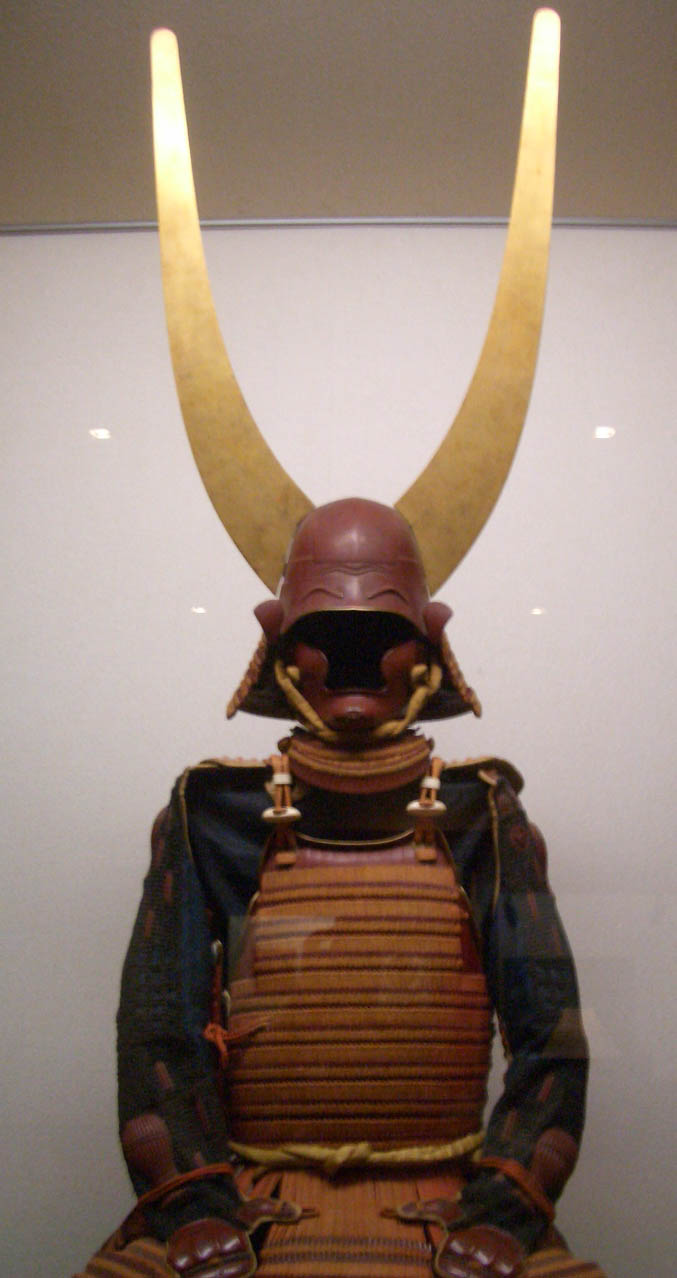
Ii Naomasa Armor at Hikone Castle

According to the Confucian scholar Oze Hoan [ja] (1564–1640), in his biographical work Taikōki, Ii Naomasa had a beautiful face (Bishōnen), which impressed the mother of Toyotomi Hideyoshi, Ōmandokoro, during Naomasa's stay in Kyoto. The "Clan records" chronicles from Edo period also stated that during the battle of Komaki-Nagakute, Naomasa were described as "handsome and has small physical stature". However, despite his unintimidating built, Naomasa fought ferociously in the Battlefield and wearing distinguishable red armor and helmet with long horns, which rendered him a nickname 'Aka-oni'(red demon).

Naomasa was known as a brutal disciplinarian with violent temper, and punished his subordinates for the slightest mistakes, earning him the nickname of Hitokiri Hyōbu(Hyōbu the Manslayer/mass-murdering minister). According to Meishō genkō-roku (A record of famous commanders' words), Naomasa's strict attitude were influenced by Ōkubo Tadayo, who once advised Naomasa to not expect any luxurious meal during war.

An anecdote from Sakakibara clan historical records has stated that among Ieyasu generals, Honda Tadakatsu excelled in bravery and Sakakibara Yasumasa excelled in leadership, while Ii Naomasa possessed both qualities. However, modern historian Hiroyuki Kikuchi does not agree with the traditional assessment and questioned leadership quality of Naomasa, as Kikuchi quoted the historical research works of Noda Hiroko, which titled "Ii Naomasa", that during the battle in Komaki-Nagakute, Naomasa acted recklessly by personally going to fight on the frontline, engaging in melee and grappling enemy soldiers, thereby exposing himself in dangerous position. This prompted his own subordinate, Andō Naotsugu, to chastise Naomasa for his recklessness and not behaving like a military commander who should have focused on giving commands to his soldiers from the rear. Furthermore, Kikuchi pointed out the action of Naomasa in Nagakute also gave much trouble for his other field officer, Kimata Morikatsu, in coordinating their troops. Kikuchi argued that instead of Naomasa, it was Naomasa subordinates, the former Takeda clan "Red Guard" troops. who really built up their reputation as a fearsome military unit.

Naomasa was also known for his political astuteness, which enabled him to command respect when he was tasked to lead the garrison of Minowa Castle.

== Family ==
In 1590, Tobai-in gave birth to Ii Naokatsu. However, in the same year, Naomasa's second son, Ii Naotaka, was born. Naotaka's mother, Ako, was said to be the daughter of Inbu Tokuemon, who served Matsudaira Yasuchika. When Naomasa was married to Tobai-in, Ako came to the Ii family as a maid to serve as maid. It was said that Naomasa was afraid of his wife and hid not only Ako but also Naotaka. Naomasa was afraid of his wife. According to one theory, Ako risked her life to have her son Naotaka acknowledged as her son. After going to such lengths, even Naomasa had no choice but to acknowledge Naotaka as his own son.

Naomasa had built up close relations with the Matsudaira clan through marriages, as his wife, Hana, was a daughter Matsudaira Yasuchika. Yasuchika was originally from the Matsui clan and was a senior vassal and guardian of the Tojo branch of Matsudaira clan. The Tojo Matsudaira eventually lost their heir, but Tokugawa Ieyasu had his fourth son, Matsudaira Tadayoshi, to inherit the position of the head of Tojo Matsudaira. Furthermore, Tadayoshi married Masako, the daughter of Naomasa and Hana.

- Aunt: Jirō Hōshi
- Father: Ii Naochika
- Mother: Okuyama Hiyo (d.1585)
- Wife: Tobai-in, Matsudaira Hana
- Concubine: Inbu Tokuemon's daughter
- Children:
  - Ii Naokatsu by Tobai-in
  - Ii Naotaka by Inbu Tokuemon's daughter
  - Masako married Matsudaira Tadayoshi by Tobai-in
  - Koan-in married Date Hidemune by Tobai-in

== Legacy ==
As one of hereditary samurai clan in Tōtōmi Province, the Ii clan experienced a threat of extinction during Sengoku period due to a chain of events that caused Naomasa's grandfather and father to die. However, after the decline of the Imagawa clan, Naomasa offered his service to the Tokugawa clan, led by Ieyasu, and his career got a rapid boost with the support of Ieyasu, and the Ii clan was saved from the danger of disbandment. When the Tenshō-Jingo war broke out, Ieyasu was in dire need for young vassal with prestigious family background as emissary to convince the ex-Takeda clan in Shinano province to convince them join him. However, since at that time Nobuyasu already died, Naomasa was the strongest candidate since the Ii clan historically has equal standing of ranks with Tokugawa clan. This caused many local lords and samurai clans in Shinano joined Tokugawa clan through the mediation of Naomasa as he handled around 67 letters of local lords to join the Tokugawa clan. After the war, Ieyasu entrusted the newly recruited samurai from ex-Takeda territories into the command of Ii clan. Noda concluded this is the start of the establishment of Ii clan as strong daimyo clan which ruled Hikone until the Meiji Restoration. Historian Toshikazu Komiyama believed this steps were an effort of Ieyasu to strengthen and rejuvenate the Ii clan after facing danger of extinction due to decades of troubles which weakened them internally.

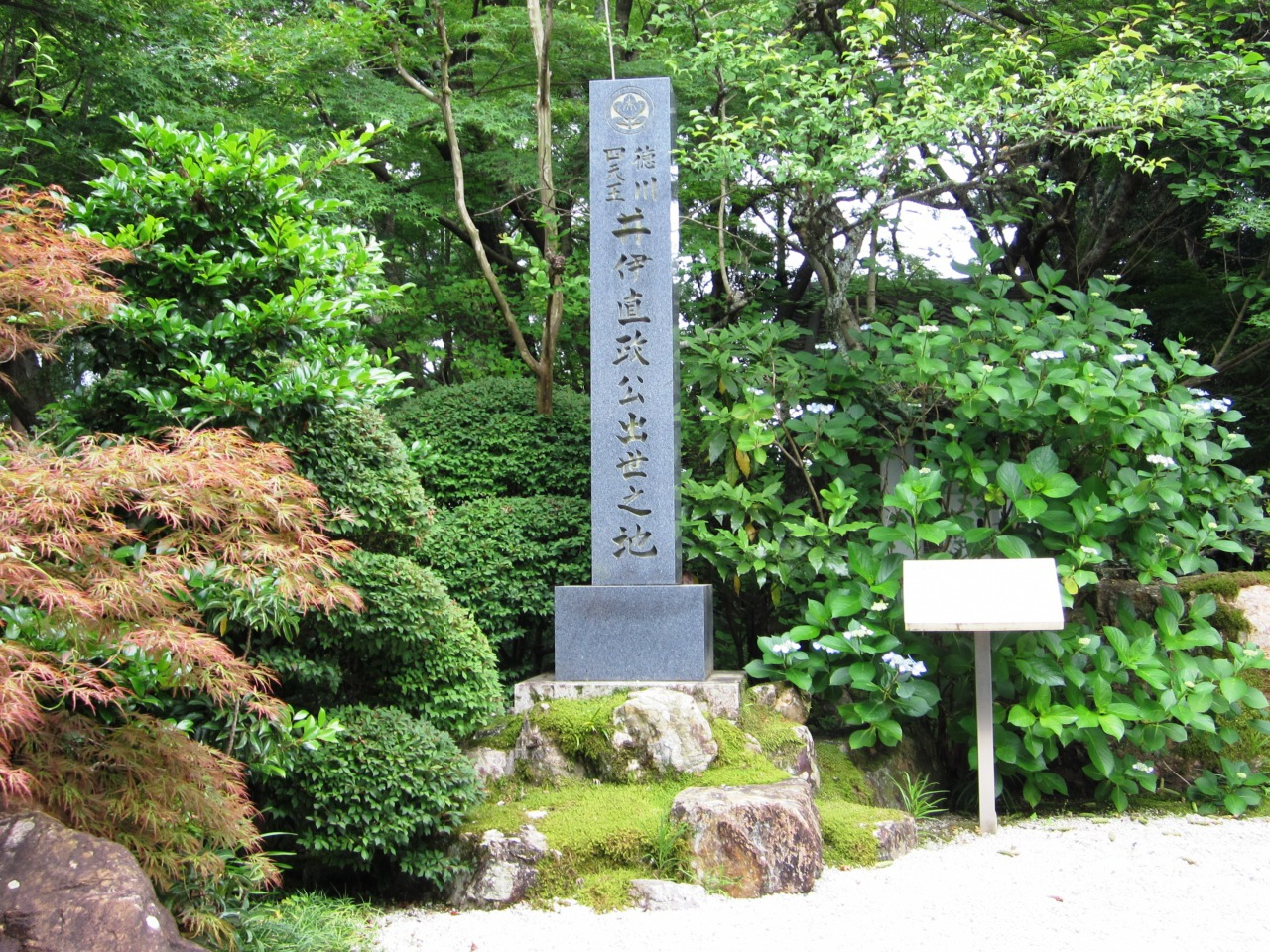
The monument of Ii Naomasa at Ryōtan-ji in Hamamatsu, Shizuoka

Ii Naomasa was also known as the founder of Hikone Castle, after he given task by Tokugawa Ieyasu appoint him the rule of a new domain centered at Sawayama Castle. The Hikone Castle completed by his son Ii Naokatsu in 1622. The area remained under the control of Hikone Domain through the end of the Edo Period. He also known as the first governor of the newly established Hikone Domain, which formed from the eastern part of Ōmi Province that formerly known as Sawayama domain which ruled by Ishida Mitsunari. The Hikone domain which inherited through generation to descendants of Naomasa's Ii clan survived until 1871 with its last ruler from Ii clan was Ii Naonori.

Aside from the Hikone Domain, another historical Domain founded under Naomasa's rule were Takasaki Domain, which he control for sometimes before it was transferred to Sakai Ietsugu, son of Sakai Tadatsugu.

Naomasa's sets of armour are all preserved and exhibited within Hikone Castle museum, including an armor with golden horns in its helmet. The armor is fully coated in shu-urushi (red lacquer). This kind of armor were recorded being used by Naomasa during the battle of Komaki-Nagakute. Another armor which the museum preserved is the first Naomasa armor which he used during the battle of Shibahara. This kind of armor were lacking gold horns.

Another preserved artifacts belonged to Ii Naomasa was a Haori jacket made from feathers of peacock. this Haori was given by Ieyasu to Naomasa as reward for his escort against outlaws attacks during the escape of Ieyasu from Sakai to Mikawa in the aftermath of Honnoji incident.

== Ii clan's Red Demons brigade ==
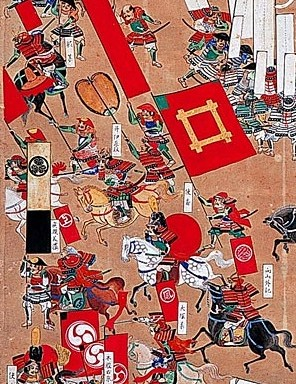
Edo period depiction of the "Red Guards" (Akazonae) of the Ii clan

Ii Naomasa was known for his notable elite troops which were nicknamed as Ii clan's Red Demons (赤鬼)(Akaoni), or Red Guards (赤備え)(akazonae).

In March 1582, the Ii clan under Naomasa absorbed many of the Takeda's samurai vassals into their ranks, after he made a blood pact (Kishômon) with 70 samurai warriors from Tsuchiya clan that formerly served Tsuchiya Masatsugu, one of Twenty-Four Generals of Takeda Shingen, to serve him as Hatamoto retainers. Meanwhile, another source mentioned that total of 120 Tsuchiya clan's samurai warriors had joined Naomasa's rank instead. Later, during the Tenshō-Jingo War in 1582 between Tokugawa and the Hojo clan, Naomasa further absorbed many samurai warriors from various clans that formerly served under various Takeda generals such as Ichijō Nobutatsu, Yamagata Masakage, Masatsune Tsuchiya, and Hara Masatane, into his ranks. The negotiation to convince them to join Naomasa was aided by a former Takeda clan retainer named Kimata Morikatsu, who organized the contacts of those samurai clans with Naomasa.

Recently in 2023, a letter of Naomasa Ii's which was sent to a former Takeda general named Obata Nobusada (小幡信真) (Note: different person than Obata Masamori Nobusada}who already died) during the conflict between Tokugawa against Hojo clan, was disclosed by Hiroko Noda, an official of Hikone castle museum. The content of the letter was Naomasa's assurance to Nobusada that he would accept his surrender to Tokugawa.

The warriors which Naomasa commanded on the battlefield were notable for being outfitted almost completely in blood-red armour from their mounted samurai, bannermen, to even ashigaru. It was said this was for psychological impact, a tactic he adopted from Yamagata Masakage, one of Takeda Shingen's generals. Constantine Nomikos Vaporis stated that the adaption of the lacquer based armor to a Japanese Samurai army had allowed the introduction of various color themes for their armor, such as Naomasa and Masakage red-clad armor units. This tradition of red armored cavalry corps was reportedly started from Obu Toramasa, elder brother of Masakage. According to Kōyō Gunkan, Obata Nobusada. who submitted to Naomasa during the Tensho Jingo war, also allegedly commanded a Red armored cavalry units which was different from the Red cavalry units of Yamagata Masakage.

Aside from the Takeda clan's samurais, Ieyasu also assigned his own vassals from Iinoya domain such as the "Iinoya's trio" (Iinoya-Sanninshu) clans to his command. The Iinoya trio were a powerful clans that originated from eastern side of Mikawa who contributed much for Ieyasu expansion during his conquest of former Imagawa territories in Tōtōmi Province. One of the Iinoya's trio sons, Kondō Hideyo from the Kondō clan also entered service of Naomasa in 1584 as his Yoriki (officer) with semi-autonomous authority. Before serving Naomasa, Hideyo himself was already a veteran warrior who participated in Ieyasu's campaigns and gained many military merits in the Battle of Anegawa, Battle of Mikatagahara, Battle of Nagashino, and the Siege of Takatenjin Castle. Hideyo later also fought under Ii Naomasa's banner on the battle of Komaki-Nagakute, first siege of Ueda, Siege of Odawara, and Toyotomi's "Ōshū shioki" campaign in suppressing Kunohe Masazane's rebellion.

Furthermore, Ii Naomasa also employed Iga ninja clans from Iga Province which led by Miura Yo'emon. Miura Yo'emon was reportedly entered the service of Ii clan in 1603. This ninja army saw action during the Siege of Osaka under the lead of Ii Naotaka, heir of Naomasa who was also given control of Ii clan's red demons after Naomasa died. Furthermore, according to a modern day Ii clan's descendant, Ii Takeo, during the Battle of Yao, the Red Guards of Ii clan performed feats as their role was crucial for the Tokugawa clan victory as they managed to beat the forces of Chōsokabe Morichika.

Historians such as Michifumi Isoda opined that one factor in why the Tokugawa clan could conquer Japan was due to the incorporation of the former Takeda clan's vassals into its ranks, including Yamagata Masakage's elite red brigade cavalry entering into Naomasa's command.

== Popular culture ==
In theater and other contemporary works, Naomasa is often characterized as the opposite of Ieyasu's other great general: Honda Tadakatsu. While both were fierce warriors of the Tokugawa, an anecdote recorded by Japanese writer Yoshiaki Kusudo states that where despite being lightly armored, Tadakatsu never received any injury during his life, while Naomasa always received wounds every battle despite heavily armored. It was said that the armor Naomasa wore reached 60 kg in weight.

A Japanese historical drama NHK show What Will You Do, Ieyasu? (どうする家康, Dousuru Ieyasu; What Would You Do, Ieyasu?,) has Rihito Itagaki portray Ii Naomasa. In this show, He is depicted as playboy and handsome young vassal of Ieyasu who has an arrogant personality.

== Appendix ==
=== Bibliography ===
- 山本博文監修 (2007). 江戸時代人物控1000. 小学館. p. 23. ISBN 978-4-09-626607-6.
- 村川浩平 (2013). "天正・文禄・慶長期、武家叙任と豊臣姓下賜の事例" (PDF). 駒沢史学. 80.
- Akira Imatani (1993). 天皇と天下人. 新人物往来社. ISBN 4404020732. "Akira Imatani"Practice of attacking fallen warriors"; 2000; p.153 chapter 4"
- Arthur Lindsay Sadler (2014). The Maker of Modern Japan The Life of Tokugawa Ieyasu. Taylor & Francis. ISBN 9781136924705.
- Constantine Nomikos Vaporis Ph.D. (2019). Samurai An Encyclopedia of Japan's Cultured Warriors. Bloomsbury Publishing USA. ISBN 9781440842719.
- Hirayama, Yū (2011), 武田遺領をめぐる動乱と秀吉の野望 [Takeda's Territory and Hideyoshi's Ambitions], 戎光祥出版, ISBN 978-4-86403-035-9
- Motomaro Nakamura; Fusai Nakamura (1951). Ii Naomasa/Naotaka. 彦根史談会.
- Noda, Hiroko (2007). "徳川家康天下掌握過程における井伊直政の役割" [The role of Ii Naomasa in the process of Tokugawa Ieyasu taking control of the country]. 彦根城博物館研究紀要. 18. Hikone Castle Museum.
- Noda, Hiroko (2017). 井伊直政―家康筆頭家臣への軌跡 [Naomasa Ii: The path to becoming Ieyasu's chief retainer]. 戎光祥出版. ISBN 978-4-86403-262-9.
- Seiji Kobayashi (1994). 秀吉権力の形成 書札礼・禁制・城郭政策 [Formation of Hideyoshi's power: Calligraphy, prohibition, and castle policy] (in Japanese). 東京大学出版会. ISBN 9784130260596.
- Turnbull, Stephen (1998). The Samurai Sourcebook. London: Cassell & Co. ISBN 9781854095237.
- Stephen Turnbull (2008). Ninja (in Indonesian). Kepustakaan Populer Gramedia. p. 55. ISBN 9789799101242.
- Stephen Turnbull (2012). Ninja AD 1460–1650. Bloomsbury Publishing. ISBN 9781782002567.
- 野田浩子 (2017). 井伊直政: 家康筆頭家臣への軌跡 [Naomasa Ii: His path to becoming Ieyasu's top vassal]. Ebisukosyo Publication. ISBN 978-4-86403-262-9.
- なかむらたつお (1991). 歴史群像シリーズ22 徳川四天王 (in Japanese). 学習研究社. ISBN 978-4051053673.
- 野田, 浩子 (2007). "徳川家康天下掌握過程における井伊直政の役割". 彦根城博物館研究紀要. 18.
- Tatsuo Nakamura (1991). (知勇兼備の戦国武将の典型 井伊直政) Vol 2 [Ii Naomasa, a typical Sengoku warlord with wisdom and courage Vol 2] (in Japanese). 歴史群像シリーズ /Rekishi Gun-sho series.
- Toshikazu Komiyama (2002). 井伊直政家臣団の形成と徳川家中での位置 [Formation of Ii Naomasa's vassals and their position within the Tokugawa clan]. 学習院史学 (Thesis). Gakushuin University Historical Society. pp. 50～66. hdl:10959/988.
  - Included in Komiyama Toshikazu『譜代大名の創出と幕藩体制』（吉川弘文館、2015年） ISBN 978-4-642-03468-5 / "Creation of Fudai Daimyo and Shogunate System" (Yoshikawa Kobunkan, 2015)
- 参謀本部 編 (1978). 日本戦史第13巻 小牧役 [Japanese War History Volume 13: Komaki Role] (in Japanese). "modern digital library edit of original edition 1908"
- Tanaka, Kaoru (2007). 松本藩. シリーズ藩物語. 現代書館. ISBN 978-4-7684-7108-1.

=== Primary sources ===
- Taikōki record by Oze Hoan
- Kansei chōshū sho kafu by Hotta Masaatsu
- "Ii Naomasa's letters" preserved by Hikone castle
- Tokugawa Nikki (Diary of Tokugawa)
- "Ii clan's records" by Ii clan descendants
- Mikawa Monogatari by Ōkubo Tadachika
- "Kōyō Gunkan" by Kōsaka Masanobu and Obata Kagenori
- "Sakakibara clan's records" by Sakakibara clan descendants
- Han-Kanfu (Domain records)
- Mikawa Go-fudoki by Hiraiwa Chikayoshi / Hosoi Ujinori.

Preceded by none	Daimyō of Takasaki; 1590–1600	Succeeded by Sakai Ietsugu
Preceded by none	Daimyō of Hikone; 1600–1602	Succeeded by Ii Naokatsu
