= Hikone (disambiguation) =

Hikone, Shiga is a city in Japan.

Hikone may also refer to:

- Hikone Domain, a feudal domain of Japan during the Edo period
- Hikone Station, a railway station

== See also ==
- Hikone screen, a 17th century Japanese painted byōbu folding screen
