= Tobai-in =

Wife of Ii Naomasa

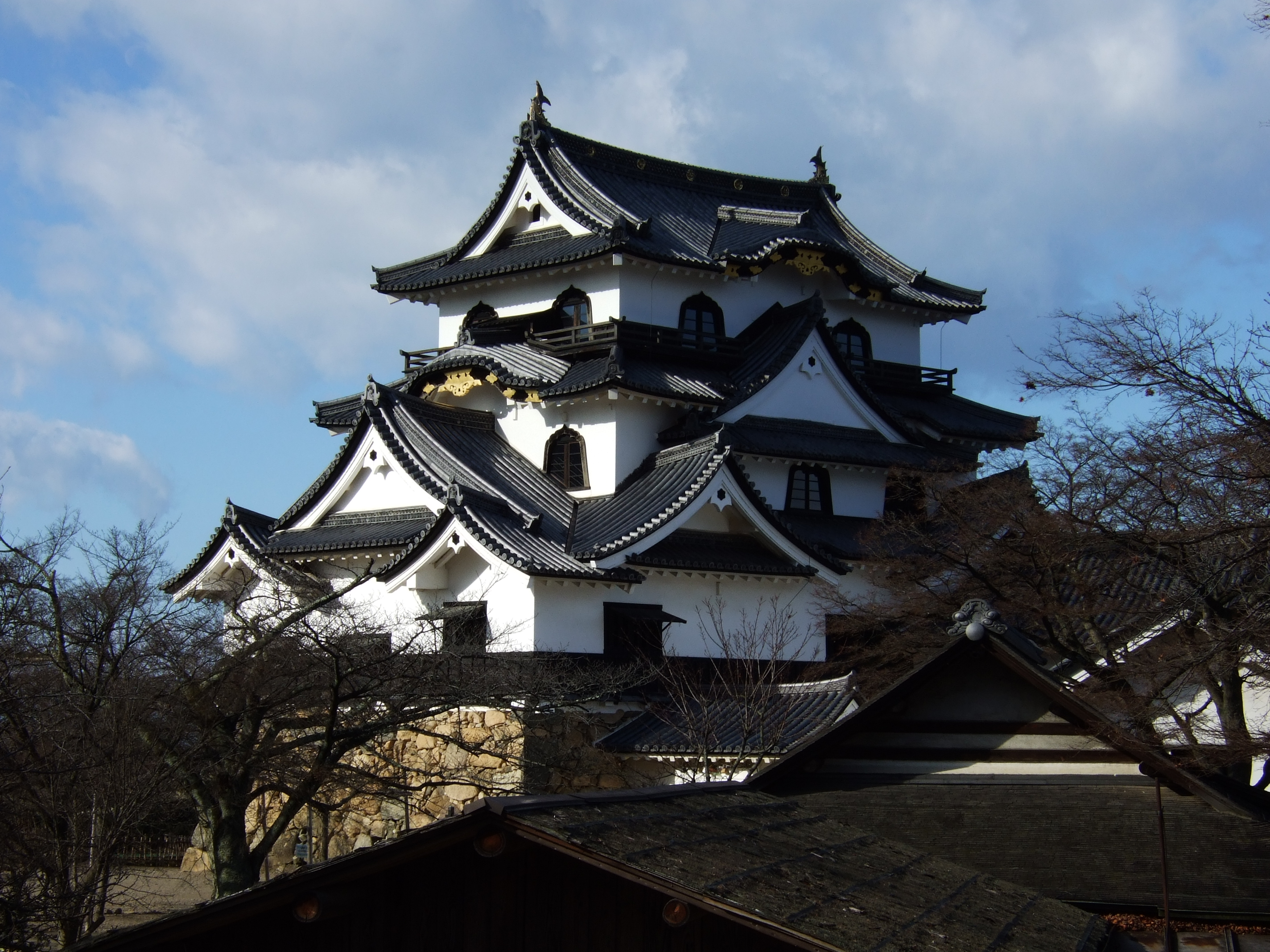
Hikone Castle, the seat of the Ii clan during the Edo period

Tobai-in (唐梅院, d. August 2, 1639) was a Japanese woman of the late Azuchi–Momoyama through early Edo periods. Tobai-in was known for her beauty and intelligence. She was the daughter of Matsudaira Yasuchika. Her half-brother was Matsudaira Yasushige. In 1582 she was adopted by Tokugawa Ieyasu. On January 11, 1584, Ieyasu gave her in marriage to Ii Naomasa, one of the four Shitennō of the Tokugawa. Their son, Ii Naokatsu was the first Lord of Annaka Domain in Kōzuke Province. Her older daughter married Matsudaira Tadayoshi, son of Tokugawa Ieyasu and brother of the shōgun Tokugawa Hidetada. Her younger daughter married Date Hidemune, Date Masamune's first son. In 1602, when Naomasa died due to injuries from Sekigahara, she became a nun. However her son was only 12 years old, so she continued to support her son as daimyō of the clan until he was of age. Tobai-in had a memorial built for her husband in Shiga Prefecture. After her death in 1639, she was buried in Hikone Castle, in the Annaka Domain. She was also known as Seizen-in (清泉院) and Hana (花).
