= Ii Naokatsu =

Japanese daimyō

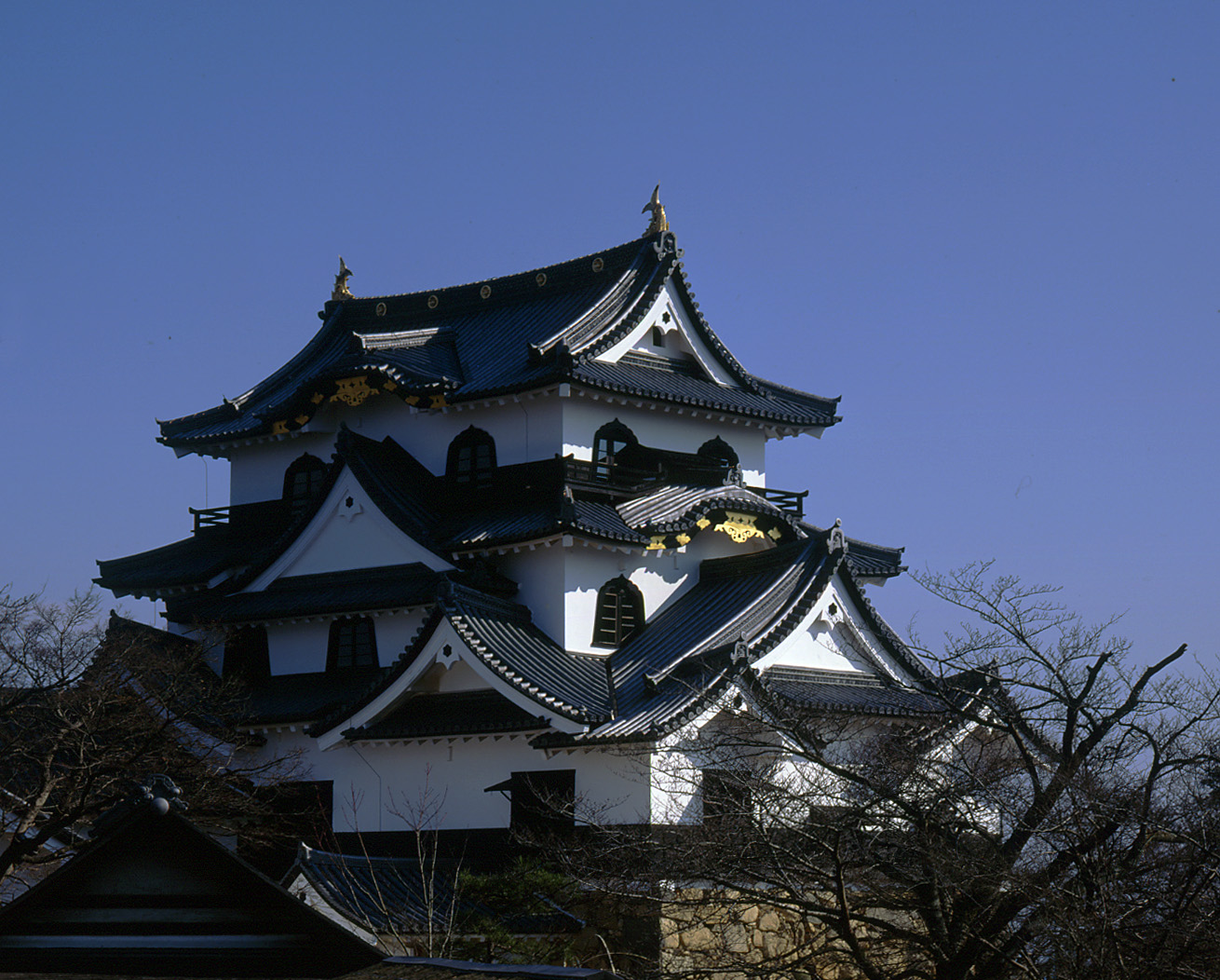
- Hikone Castle, which Ii Naokatsu helped build

Head of Ii clan
- In office 1602–1615
- Preceded by: Ii Naomasa
- Succeeded by: Ii Naotaka

1st Daimyō of Annaka
- In office 1615–1632
- Succeeded by: Ii Naoshige

Personal details
- Born: 1590
- Died: August 24, 1662 (aged 71–72) Ōmi Province
- Parents: Ii Naomasa (father); Tobai-in (mother)
- Relatives: Ii Naotaka (brother)

Ii Naokatsu (井伊 直勝; 1590 – August 24, 1662) was a Japanese daimyō of the Edo period who served the Tokugawa clan. He was also known as Ii Naotsugu. His childhood name was Manchiyo (万千代). Naokatsu succeeded to family headship following his father's death in 1602.

Under Tokugawa Ieyasu's orders, Naokatsu completed construction of Hikone Castle in 1606, and then moved there from Sawayama Castle when it was largely completed.

In 1614, as Naokatsu was ill, he sent his brother Ii Naotaka to fight in the Siege of Osaka; Naokatsu himself was assigned to Annaka Domain, where he undertook security duty in the Kantō region. After the siege of Osaka, Tokugawa Ieyasu rewarded Naokatsu's younger brother Naotaka with the Ii family headship, and allowed Naokatsu to form a branch family with holdings at the fief of Annaka in Kōzuke Province, worth 30,000 koku. Naokatsu retired in 1632, yielding headship to his son Naoshige. He died in Ōmi Province in 1662.

His descendants were moved around several times before having their holdings settle at Itoigawa, in Echigo Province.

== Family ==
- Father: Ii Naomasa
- Mother: Tobai-in
- Wives:
  - Torii Tadamasa's daughter
  - Nakazima Shinzaemon's daughter
- Children:
  - Ii Naoyoshi by Nakazima Shinzaemon's daughter
  - daughter married Ii Naoshige

== Title ==
Preceded by Ii Naomasa	2nd Daimyō of Hikone; 1602–1615	Succeeded by Ii Naotaka
Preceded by none	1st Daimyō of Annaka; 1615–1632	Succeeded by Ii Naoyoshi
