= Ii Naotaka =

Japanese daimyō

Junior Third Rank Ii Naotaka
- 井伊 直孝
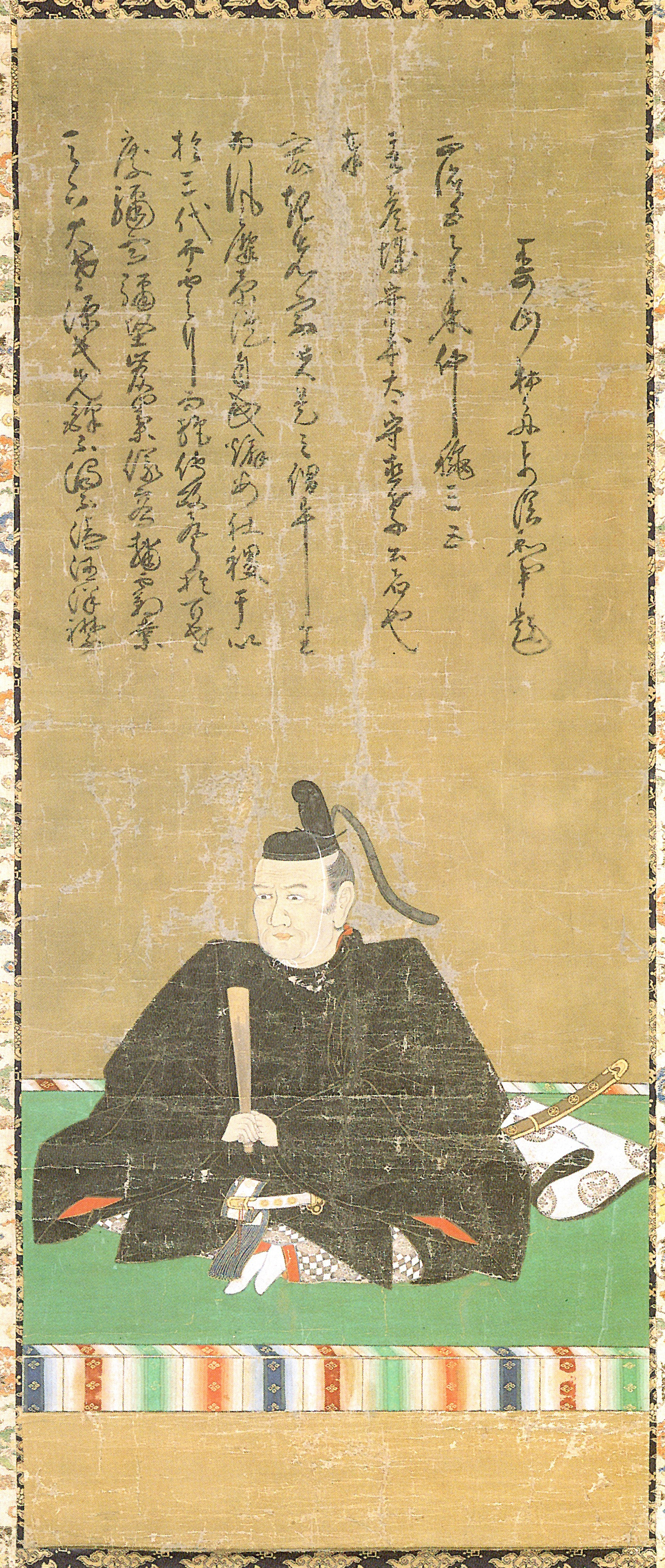

Head of Ii clan
- In office 1615–1659
- Preceded by: Ii Naokatsu
- Succeeded by: Ii Naozumi

3rd Daimyō of Hikone
- In office 1615–1659
- Preceded by: Ii Naokatsu
- Succeeded by: Ii Naozumi

Personal details
- Born: March 16, 1590
- Died: August 16, 1659 (aged 69)

Military service
- Allegiance: Tokugawa clan Tokugawa Shogunate
- Unit: Ii clan
- Battles/wars: Siege of Osaka (1614-1615)

Ii Naotaka (井伊 直孝; March 16, 1590 – August 16, 1659) was a Japanese daimyō of the early Edo period who served under the Tokugawa shogunate. He was the son of the famous Tokugawa general Ii Naomasa. His childhood name was Bennosuke (弁之介).

Naotaka served in the Siege of Osaka in his brother Naokatsu's stead, where he would gain tremendous favor for his exploits at Tennōji. After the battle, he would be granted his brother's lands at Sawayama in Ōmi Province. He would finish the construction of Hikone castle in 1622, a project which had been started by his brother in 1603.

Both Naotaka and his father Naomasa are playable characters from the Eastern Army in the original Kessen.

Hikonyan, mascot of Hikone Castle, is based on a folktale about how Naotaka was saved from a lightning strike by a maneki-neko.

In 1917, Naotaka was posthumously granted the courtesy title of junior third rank (ju san-mi, 従三位) by Emperor Taishō.

== Family ==
- Father: Ii Naomasa
- Mother: Inbu Tokuemon's daughter
- Wife: Akihime, daughter of Hachisuka Iemasa
- Concubines:
  - Shunkoin
  - Endo clan's daughter
  - Ishii clan's daughter
- Children:
  - Ii Naozumi (1625-1676)
  - Matsuchiyo
  - Ii Naohiro
  - Ii Naotsuna (1622-1658) by Ishii clan's daughter
  - Ii Naoshige (1612-1661) by Endo clan's daughter
