= Taikōki =

Biography of Toyotomi Hideyoshi

The Taikōki (太閤記) is a biography of Toyotomi Hideyoshi, who rose to the office of taikō during the Azuchi–Momoyama period of Japanese history. The Confucian scholar Oze Hoan (1564–1640) published the work in 1626 during the rule of the third Tokugawa shōgun Iemitsu. The work was published five times between 1626 and 1710. The complete work spans 22 scrolls.

The Taikōki shows the influence of Hoan's individual views of history and interpretations of historical materials.

Modern historical novels based on the Taikōki include the Shinsho Taikōki by Eiji Yoshikawa, Ihon Taikōki by Sōhachi Yamaoka, and Shinshi Taikōki by Ryōtarō Shiba. Yoshikawa's novel was the basis for the yearlong NHK television Taiga drama Taikōki (1965). Shiba's novel and others of his works gave the story to Kunitori Monogatari (1973), another Taiga drama.
