= Hikone Castle =

Japanese Edo-period castle

- 彦根城
- Hikone, Shiga-ken, Japan
- Tenshu of Hikone Castle

Site information
- Type: Hirayama-style Japanese castle
- Controlled by: Ii clan (1622–1874); Japan (1874–present)
- Condition: Largely intact. Inner Palace rebuilt in 1987.

Location
- Hikone Castle
- Location within Shiga Prefecture Location within Japan
- Coordinates: 35°16′35″N 136°15′06″E

Site history
- Built: 1603–1622
- Built by: Ii Naokatsu
- In use: 1622–1876?
- Materials: Wood, stone, plaster, tile

Hikone Castle (彦根城, Hikone-jō) is an Edo-period Japanese castle located in the city of Hikone, Shiga Prefecture, Japan. It is considered the most significant historical site in Shiga. The site has been protected as a National Historic Site since 1951. Hikone is one of only twelve castles in Japan with its original tenshu, and one of only five castles with buildings listed as National Treasures.

== Overview ==
Hikone Castle is located one kilometer from Lake Biwa due to land reclamation, but originally the castle was directly on the lakeshore, and the north and east sides were surrounded by water. The Hikone area is in eastern Ōmi Province, and the site was a natural bottleneck on the route of the Tōsandō (later the Nakasendō) highway connecting Heian-kyō with the eastern provinces. Strategically, it was a vital point in protecting the capital from attack from the east. In the Sengoku period, this area was controlled by the Azai clan, who were based in northern Ōmi, and who built a castle called Sawayama Castle approximately two kilometers from this site. The Azai were defeated by Oda Nobunaga, who assigned Sawayama Castle to his general Niwa Nagahide. Under Toyotomi Hideyoshi, this closest advisor, Ishida Mitsunari was entrusted with the castle. After Ishida Mitsunari was defeated at the Battle of Sekigahara in 1601, Tokugawa Ieyasu appointed his general Ii Naomasa as daimyō of a new domain centered at Sawayama Castle.

Ii Naomasa was one of the most capable and trusted of Ieyasu's generals, noted not only for his military prowess, but also for his diplomacy and strategies. At first, he used Sawayama Castle, but was not happy with its situation. The castle was considered obsolete and had weak defenses as it was divided between hilltop and hillside areas. Furthermore, it was formerly the stronghold of the enemy leader and had strong associations with the former regime. Therefore, Ii Naomasa decide to relocate his seat to a new location on the shores of Lake Biwa, constructing a new castle per the latest contemporary design. The site was previously occupied by a Buddhist temple called Hogon-ji which had been built in 1080 and which was a popular pilgrimage site for the worship of Kannon.

Hikone Castle consists of two concentric water moats surrounding a 100 meter hill called "Mount Konki". The hill itself is divided roughly into three sections, with the "Kane-no-maru" enclosure in the southeast, the "Nishi-no-maru" enclosure in the northwest and the "Honmaru", or inner bailey in the middle. Dry moats protect these inner enclosures and are crossed by bridges. The faces of the moats were protected by stones. Originally front gate was "Otemon" gate facing westward, but later the "Sawaguchi" gate facing southeast which connected to Nakasendō became the main gate.

To save time and expense, the Ii clan scavenged many stones and buildings by demolishing all other fortifications in their territory and bringing the materials to Hikone. The three-story tenshu located at the center of the castle was brought from Ōtsu Castle. Originally built in 1575, the exterior has an older style of decoration on each roof, and the overall structure appears short and stout, as it was modified from what was originally a five-story tower. The "Tenbin yagura" was brought from Nagahama Castle. It is a gate with two two-story yagura watchtowers on either side, which protect the dry moats in front of the gate. The "Nishinomaru Sanju Yagura" was brought from Odani Castle.

== History ==
However, due to injuries which he had suffered in battle, he died in 1602 when construction had just begun. The castle was finally completed under his son Ii Naokatsu in 1622 after 20 years of construction. The castle was used as the administrative center of Hikone Domain. Often considered the foremost of the fudai daimyō, the Ii clan served in many important positions within the Tokugawa shogunate. During the Bakumatsu period, the tairō Ii Naosuke was virtual ruler of the country during a time of very weak and ineffectual shoguns. However, his acquiescence in ending Japan's national isolation policy under pressure from the western powers led to his assassination by pro-Sonnō Jōi forces in 1860. The final daimyō of Hikone, Ii Naonori grew increasingly dissatisfied with the hostile treatment still accorded Hikone Domain by the shogunal administration, which was dominated by the Hitotsubashi faction which had been hostile to Ii Naosuke. He also came to the realization that shogunate's military system and equipment was now obsolete compared with the Satchō Alliance. Although Hikone Domain had been one of the strongest supporters of the Tokugawa shogunate, he was among the first to support the imperial cause in the Boshin War. During the Battle of Toba-Fushimi, although Hikone forces were stationed at Osaka Castle, they did not join the shogunal army, but simply marched home. The domain later took part in combat against the pro-shogunate Ōgaki Domain, and in other locations. The new Meiji government confirmed him as imperial governor of Hikone. When the new government ordered the dismantling of all feudal-era fortification nationwide, Hikone Castle was spared by a direct request from the emperor himself, who was touring the area. This preserved Hikone Castle intact. Today it remains one of the oldest largely original-construction castles in Japan.

In 1934, the grounds of the castle were planted with over 1,000 Yoshino cherry trees. The castle and its grounds were donated by the Ii clan to the city of Hikone in 1944. During World War II, the city of Hikone was scheduled for destruction by an air raid on the night of August 15, 1945, but the end of the war occurred at noon that same day and the bombing was not conducted.

The main keep of Hikone Castle, along with its attached Tsuke Turret and Tamon Turret, were designated as a National Treasure by the Ministry of Education, Science, Sports and Culture in 1952.

Several other structures have been accorded Important Cultural Property status. Like the main keep complex, most of these structures are actually complexes of two or more connected buildings:

- Umaya (馬屋, Stable)
- Tenbin Yagura (天秤櫓, Balance Scale Turret; 5 connected structures)
- Taikomon Yagura oyobi Tsuzuki Yagura (太鼓門及び続櫓, Drum Gate and Tsuzuki Turret; 2 connected structures)
- Ninomaru Sawachiguchi Tamon Yagura (二の丸佐和口多聞櫓, Second Bailey Sawachiguchi Tamon Turret; 2 connected structures)
- Nishinomaru Sanju Yagura oyobi Tsuzuki Yagura (西の丸三重櫓及び続櫓, West Bailey Three-story Turret and Tsuzuki Turrets; 3 connected structures)

Major repairs were undertaken to the tenshu from 1957 to 1960, and on the various yagura from 1960 to 1968. In 1987, the daimyō palace was restored as the "Hikone Castle Museum". Further repairs to the castle were undertaken from 1993 to 1996. On April 6, 2006, Hikone Castle was selected as one of Japan's Top 100 Castles by the Japan Castle Foundation in 2006.

The castle is about a 15-minute walk from Hikone Station on the JR West Biwako Line.

== Gallery ==
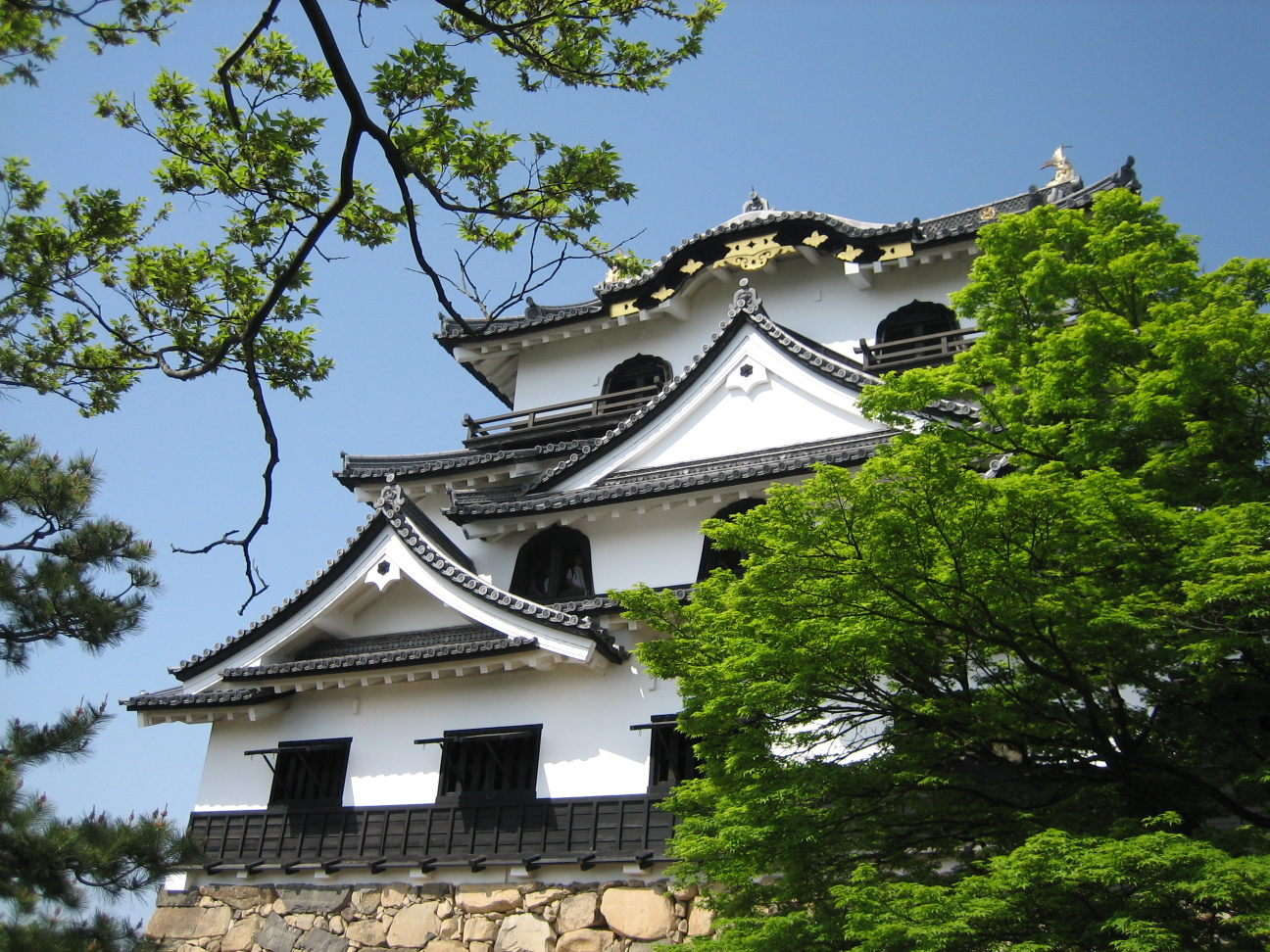
Hikone Castle

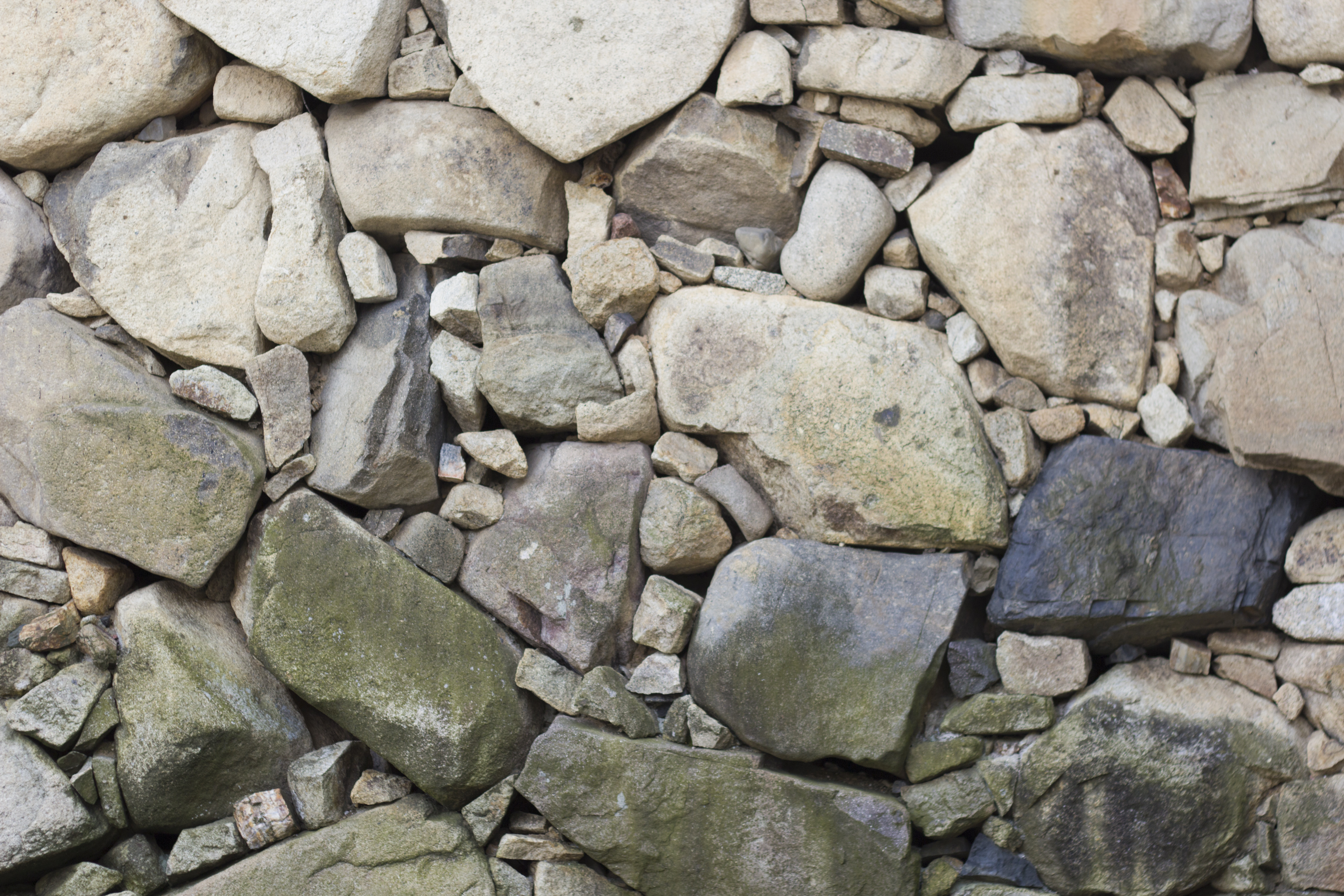
Foundation of the main keep

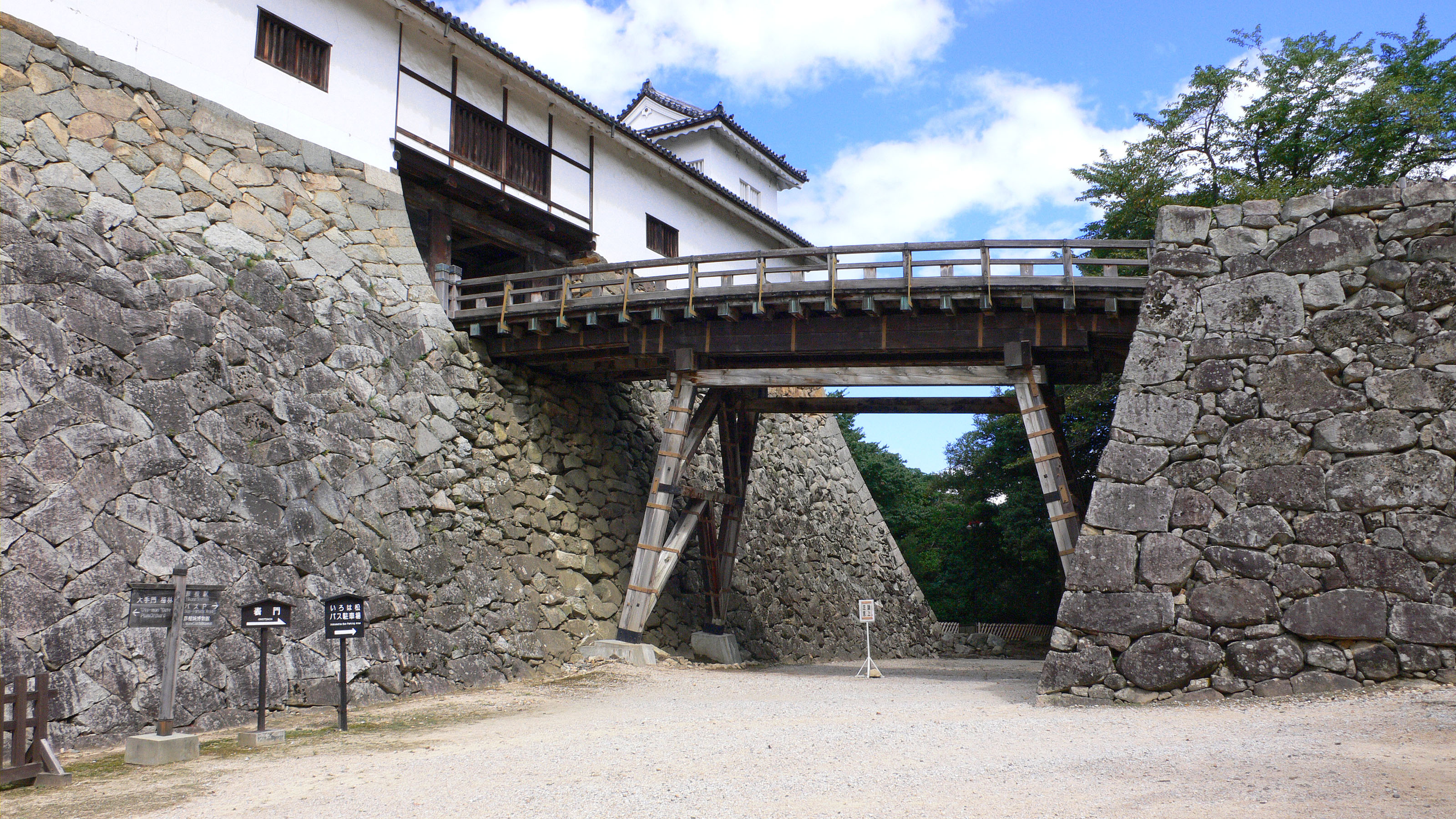
Tenbin Yagura and Rokabashi Bridge

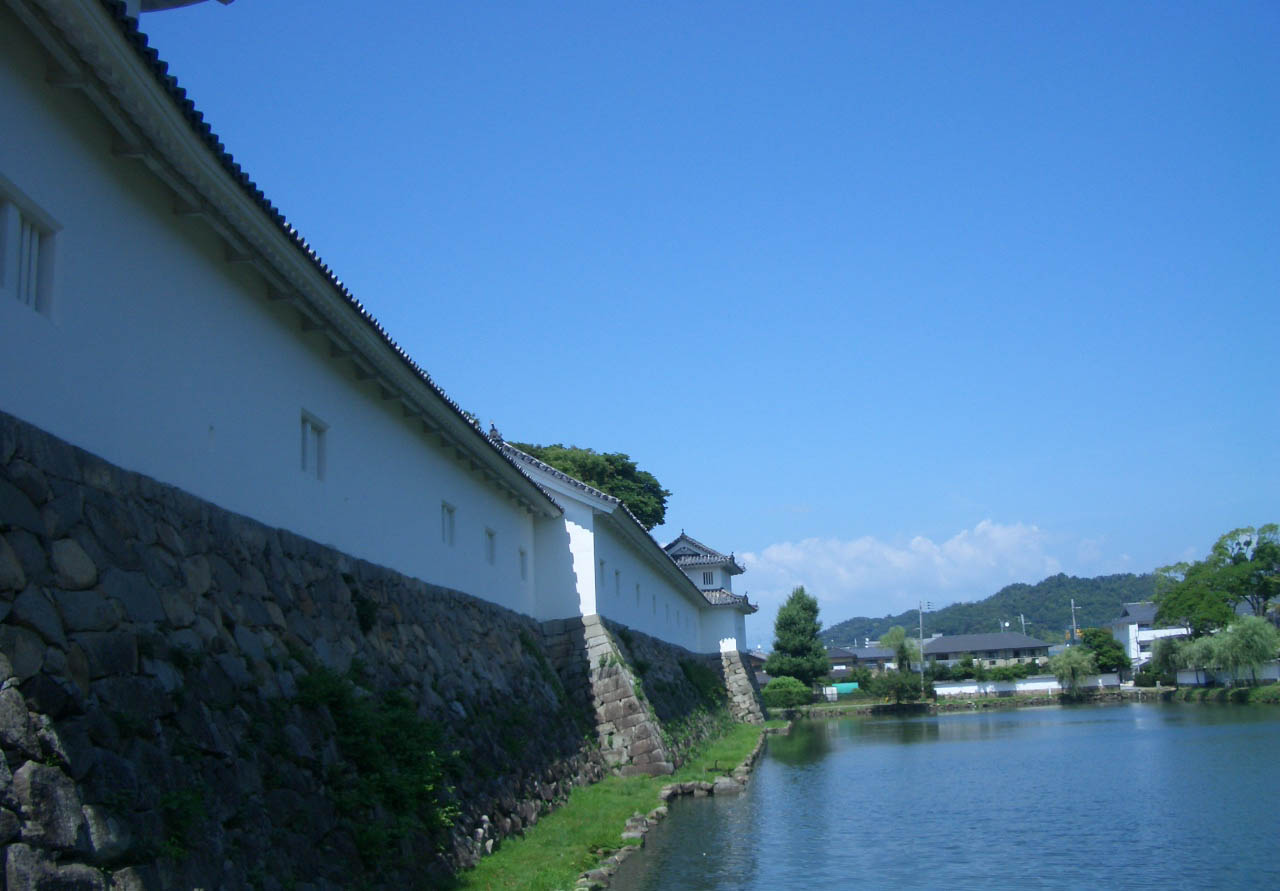
Sawaguchi Tamon Yagura

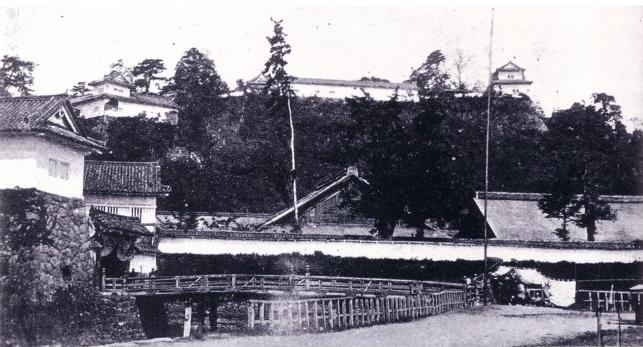
Omotemon-gate and Palace in 1876

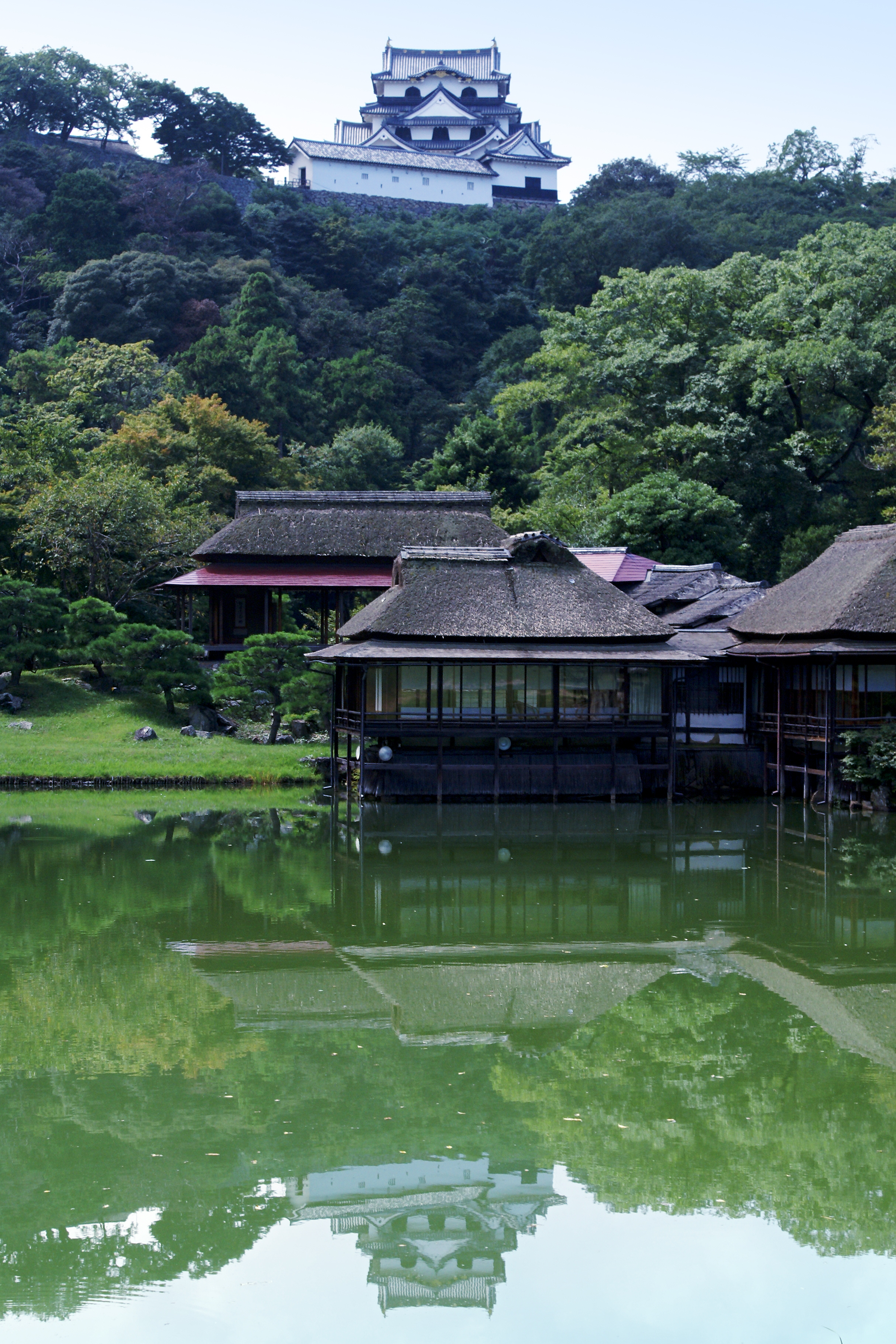
View from Genkyuen

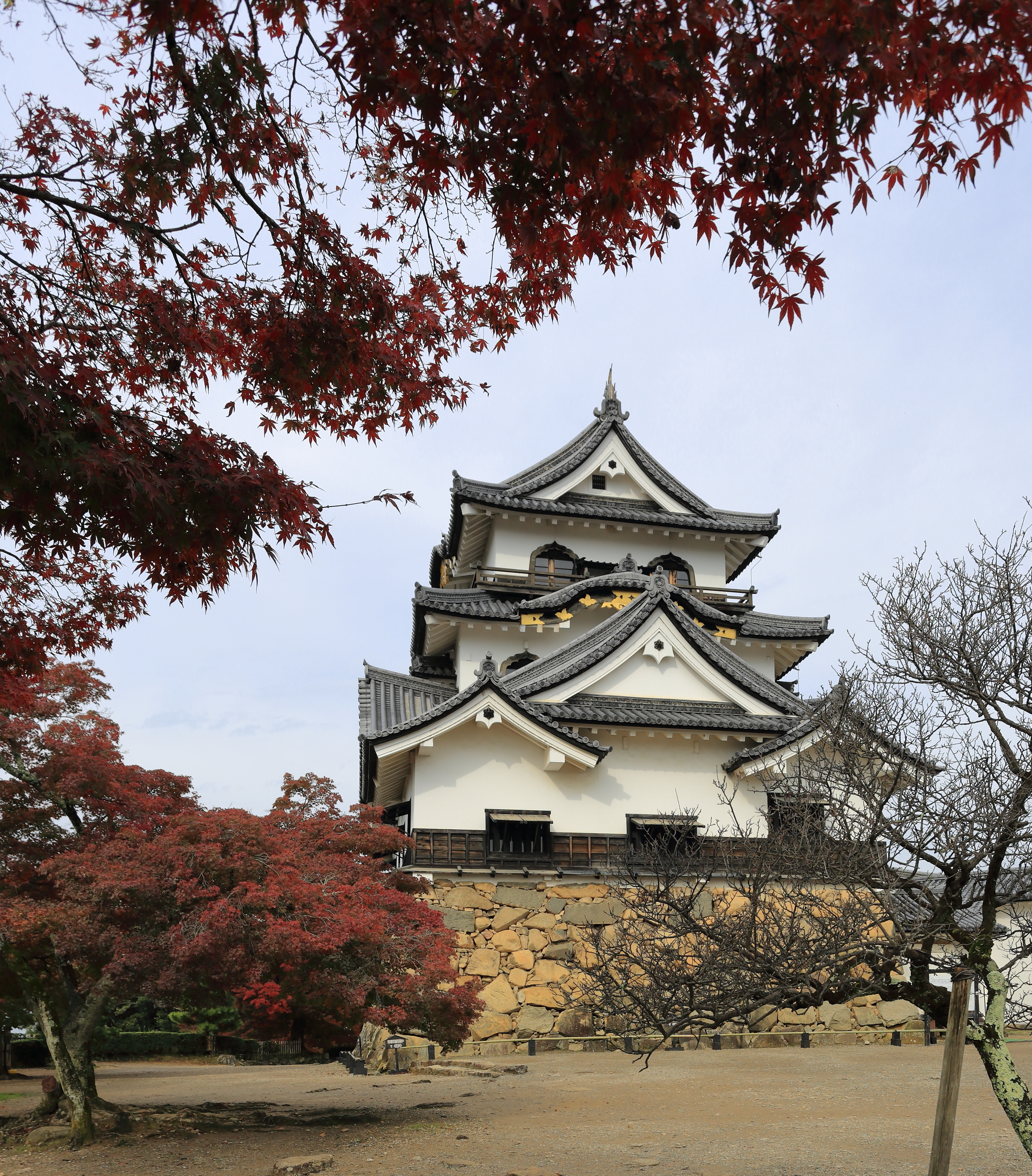
In autumn

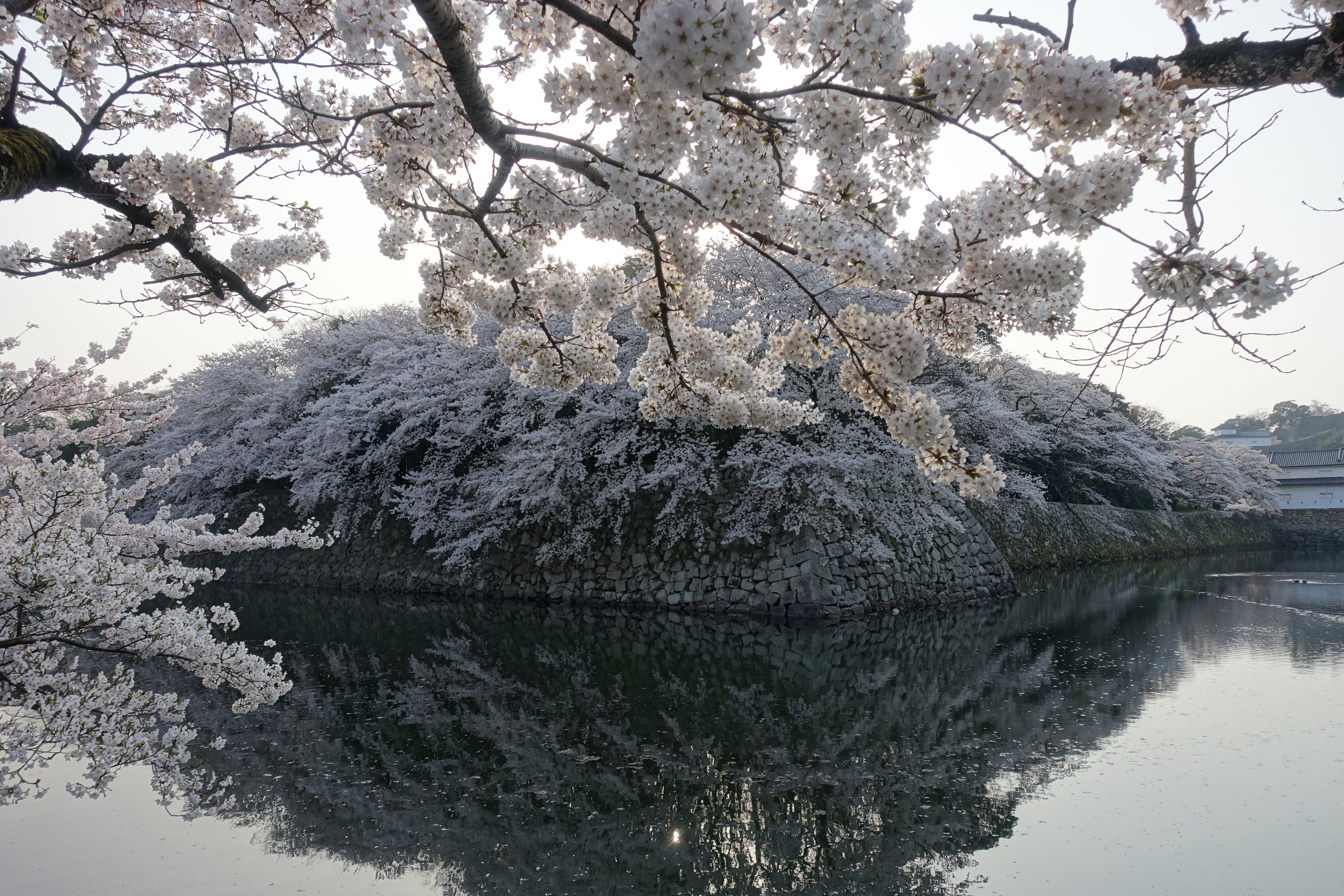
Hikone Castle moat in spring 2018

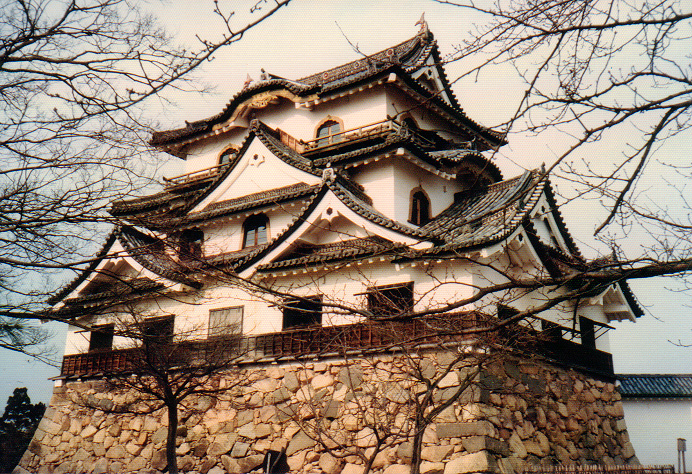
Main keep in February 1981

== See also ==
- List of Historic Sites of Japan (Shiga)
- List of National Treasures of Japan (castles)
- List of National Treasures of Japan (paintings)
- Hikonyan, mascot of Hikone Castle, based on the Maneki Neko folktale about Ii Naotaka.

== Literature ==
- De Lange, William (2021). An Encyclopedia of Japanese Castles. Groningen: Toyo Press. pp. 600 pages. ISBN 978-9492722300.
- Schmorleitz, Morton S. (1974). Castles in Japan. Tokyo: Charles E. Tuttle Co. pp. 144–145. ISBN 0-8048-1102-4.
- Motoo, Hinago (1986). Japanese Castles. Tokyo: Kodansha. p. 200 pages. ISBN 0-87011-766-1.
- Mitchelhill, Jennifer (2004). Castles of the Samurai: Power and Beauty. Tokyo: Kodansha. p. 112 pages. ISBN 4-7700-2954-3.
- Turnbull, Stephen (2003). Japanese Castles 1540-1640. Osprey Publishing. p. 64 pages. ISBN 1-84176-429-9.
