= Ii Naoyoshi =

Ii Naoyoshi (井伊 直義, ? – February 4, 1545) was a Japanese samurai of the Sengoku period who served the Imagawa clan. He was the son of Ii Naohira.

== Life ==
Ii was loyal to Tōtōmi, but he and his father served the daimyō Imagawa Yoshimoto.
