= Hikone Domain =

Feudal domain in Japan

Hikone Domain 彦根藩
- Domain of Japan
- 1601–1871
- Capital: Sawayama Castle (1600–1606); Hikone Castle (1606–1871)
- Area
  - Coordinates: 35°16′35″N 136°15′06″E
  - Type: Daimyō
- Historical era: Edo period
  - Established: 1601
  - Disestablished: 1871
- Today part of: part of Shiga Prefecture

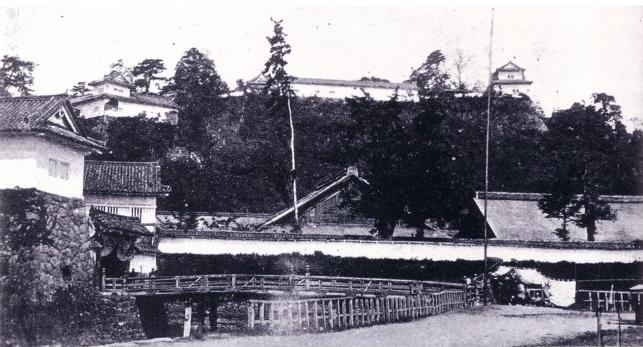
Hikone Castle

Hikone Domain (彦根藩, Hikone-han) was a fudai feudal domain under the Tokugawa shogunate of Edo period Japan. It was located in eastern Ōmi Province, in the Kansai region of central Honshu. The domain was centered at Hikone Castle, located in what is now the city of Hikone in Shiga Prefecture. It was ruled throughout its history by the Ii clan.

== History ==
Ii Naomasa, one of Tokugawa Ieyasu's closest advisors and most capable generals, was daimyō of Takasaki Domain with a kokudaka of 120,000 koku. This was increased to 180,000 koku after the Battle of Sekigahara, and he was transferred to Sawayama Castle, on the shores of Lake Biwa, which was the former home domain of Ishida Mitsunari. The domain was thus originally named Sawayama Domain (佐和山藩, Sawayama-han). Ii Naomasa disliked living at Sawayama as it had been the home of his enemy, and planned the construction of a new castle, Hikone Castle, but died before it could be completed. His successor, Ii Naokatsu, completed the project in 1606. The Ii clan continued to rule from Hikone Castle until the end of the Tokugawa shogunate, serving in many important posts. Under Ii Naotaka, an internal conflict between vassals of the Ii clan, and former hatamoto who had been transferred to become vassals of the Ii clan by Tokugawa Ieyasu was resolved, and the kokudaka of the domain was increased by 50,000 koku on three occasions (1615, 1617 and 1633), increasing its total to 300,000 koku. In addition, the domain was entrusted with administering an additional 50,000 koku of tenryō territory in Ōmi Province, bringing its actual nominal kokudaka to 350,000 koku.

During the Bakumatsu period, the domain was ruled by Ii Naosuke, who rose to the position of tairō within the shogunate administration and was virtual ruler of the country during the succession between Tokugawa Iesada and Tokugawa Iemochi. His purge of political opponents and support of the ending of Japan's national isolation with the signing of the Harris Treaty drew the wrath of the pro-Sonnō Jōi factions of samurai, and he was assassinated in 1860 in the Sakuradamon Incident. One consequence of this assassination was that the domain was reduced by 100,000 koku in 1862. Through the actions of its final daimyō, Ii Naonori in the Kinmon incident of 1864, the domain was able to recover 30,000 koku. He also participated in the Chōshū expedition, the suppression of Tenchūgumi and the Mito Rebellion. However, he grew increasingly dissatisfied with the hostile treatment still accorded Hikone Domain by the shogunal administration, which was dominated by the Hitotsubashi faction which had been hostile to Ii Naosuke. He also came to the realization that shogunate's military system and equipment was now obsolete compared with the Satchō Alliance. Thus, although Hikone Domain had been one of the strongest supporters of the Tokugawa shogunate and was regarded as first among the fudai daimyō, was among the first to change sides and support the imperial cause in the Boshin War. During the Battle of Toba-Fushimi, although Hikone forces were stationed at Osaka Castle, they did not join the shogunal army, but simply marched home. The domain later took part in combat against the pro-shogunate Ogaki Domain, and in other locations, including the capture of Kondō Isami and suppression of the Shinsengumi. The new Meiji government awarded Hikone an additional 20,000 koku shortly before the abolition of the han system. Hikone Domain became Hikone Prefecture, which was later transferred to Shiga Prefecture via Nagahama and Inukami prefectures. Ii Naonori was ennobled with the kazoku title of Count in 1884.

== Bakumatsu period holdings ==
As with most domains in the han system, Hikone Domain consisted of a discontinuous territories calculated to provide the assigned kokudaka, based on periodic cadastral surveys and projected agricultural yields.

- Ōmi Province
  - 53 villages in Echi District
  - 122 villages in Inukami District
  - 130 villages in Sakata District (whole district)
  - 18 villages in Azai District
  - 26 villages in Ika District
- Shimotsuke Province
  - 15 villages in Aso District
- Musashi Province
  - 10 villages in Ebara District
  - 9 villages in Tama District

== List of daimyō ==
#	Name	Tenure	Courtesy title	Court Rank	kokudaka
Ii clan, 1600–1871 (fudai)
1	Ii Naomasa (井伊直政)	1600–1602	Shuri-no-daibu (修理大夫)	Junior 4th Rank, Lower Grade (従四位下)	180,000 koku
x	Ii Naokatsu (井伊直勝)	1602–1615	Hyōbu-no-shōyū (兵部少輔)	Junior 4th Rank, Lower Grade (従四位下)	180,000 ->150,000 koku
2	Ii Naotaka (井伊直孝)	1615–1659	Sakone-no-chūshō (左近衛中将); Jijū (侍従)	Junior 4th Rank, Upper Grade (従四位上)	150,000 -> 200,000 -> 250,000 -> 300,000 koku
3	Ii Naozumi (井伊直澄) ★	1659–1676	Kamon-no-kami (掃部頭)	Junior 4th Rank, Lower Grade (従四位下)	300,000 koku
4	Ii Naooki (井伊直興)	1676–1701	Kamon-no-kami (掃部頭)	Junior 4th Rank, Lower Grade (従四位下)	300,000 koku
5	Ii Naomichi (井伊直通)	1701–1710	Kamon-no-kami (掃部頭); Jijū (侍従)	Junior 4th Rank, Lower Grade (従四位下)	300,000 koku
6	Ii Naotsune (井伊直恒)	1710 –1710	Kamon-no-kami (掃部頭); Jijū (侍従)	Junior 4th Rank, Lower Grade (従四位下)	300,000 koku
7	Ii Naooki (reinstated) ★	1710–1714	Kamon-no-kami (掃部頭)	Junior 4th Rank, Lower Grade (従四位下)	300,000 koku
8	Ii Naonobu (井伊直惟)	1714 –1735	Kamon-no-kami (掃部頭); Jijū (侍従)	Junior 4th Rank, Lower Grade (従四位下)	300,000 koku
9	Ii Naosada (井伊直定)	1735–1754	Kamon-no-kami (掃部頭); Jijū (侍従)	Junior 4th Rank, Upper Grade (従四位上)	300,000 koku
10	Ii Naoyoshi (井伊直禔)	1754–1754	Kamon-no-kami (掃部頭)	Junior 4th Rank, Lower Grade (従四位下)	300,000 koku
11	Ii Naosada (reinstated)	1754–1755	Kamon-no-kami (掃部頭); Jijū (侍従)	Junior 4th Rank, Upper Grade (従四位上)	300,000 koku
12	Ii Naohide (井伊直幸)★	1755–1778	Sakone-no-chūshō (左近衛中将); Jijū (侍従)	Senior 4th Rank, Upper Grade (正四位上)	300,000 koku
13	Ii Naonaka (井伊直中)	1779–1812	Sakone-no-chūshō (左近衛中将); Jijū (侍従)	Junior 4th Rank, Lower Grade (従四位下)	300,000 koku
14	Ii Naoaki (井伊直亮)	1812–1850	Sakone-no-chūshō (左近衛中将) / Kamon-no-kami (掃部頭)	Senior 4th Rank, Upper Grade (正四位上)	300,000 koku
15	Ii Naosuke (井伊直弼) ★	1846–1860	Sakone-no-chūshō (左近衛中将); Jijū (侍従)	Senior 4th Rank, Upper Grade (正四位上)	300,000 koku
16	Ii Naonori (井伊直憲)	1860–1871	Sakone-no-chūshō (左近衛中将)	Junior 4th Rank, Lower Grade (従四位下)	300,000 -> 200,000 -> 230,000 -> 250,000 koku

★ = Served as tairō

== See also ==
- List of Han
