= Ii Naonori =

Japanese politician

Senior Second Rank Count Ii Naonori
- 井伊 直憲
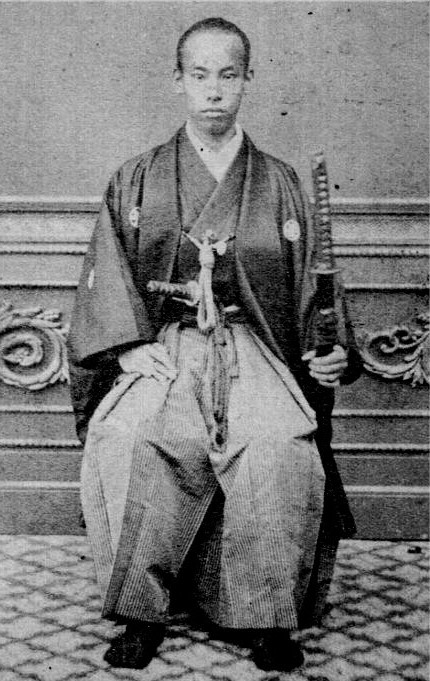
- Ii Naonori, pre-Meiji restoration

Member of the House of Peers
- In office 10 July 1890 – 10 July 1897 Elected by the Counts

Governor of Hikone Domain
- In office 1869–1871
- Monarch: Meiji
- Preceded by: Himself (as Daimyō of Hikone)
- Succeeded by: Position abolished

Daimyō of Hikone Domain
- In office 1860–1868
- Shōgun: Tokugawa Iemochi; Tokugawa Yoshinobu
- Preceded by: Ii Naosuke
- Succeeded by: Himself (as Governor of Hikone)

Personal details
- Born: 22 May 1848
- Died: 9 January 1904 (aged 55) Tokyo, Japan
- Resting place: Gōtoku-ji
- Spouse(s): Arisugawa-no-miya Yoshiko (m. 1869; died 1895) Nabeshima Tsuneko
- Parent: Ii Naoaki (father)
- Relatives: Prince Arisugawa Takahito (father-in-law); Nabeshima Naotada (father-in-law)

Ii Naonori (井伊 直憲 (いいなおのり）; 22 May 1848 – 9 January 1904) was the 16th (and final) daimyō of Hikone Domain in Bakumatsu period Japan and was the 35th hereditary chieftain of the Ii clan. Before the Meiji Restoration, his courtesy title was Kamon-no-kami, and his Court rank was Junior Fourth Rank, Lower Grade.

== Biography ==
Ii Naonori was the second son of Ii Naoaki, the brother of Ii Naosuke. His elder brother had died in childhood and Naoaki had died shortly after Naonori's birth; however, as Naonori was the child of a concubine, his birth had not even been officially reported by the time of Ii Naosuke's assassination in 1860. To avoid the attainder of Hikone Domain, immediately after Ii Naosuke's assassination, the domain appointed him as heir and continued to pretend that Ii Naosuke was still alive until all of the necessary paperwork and formalities had been completed. Ii Naonori was aged 13 at the time.

Following Ii Naosuke's assassination, the Tokugawa shogunate came under the control of his enemies, the Hitotsubashi branch of the Tokugawa clan. In 1862, Matsudaira Yoshinaga, a long-time political rival of Ii Naosuke, had the kokudaka of Hikone Domain reduced from 300,000 koku to 200,000 koku and demanded the execution of Ii Naosuke's former chief advisors, Nagano Shuzen and Rokunojo Utsugi. Despite the worsening relations between Hikone and Edo, he assisted the shogunate in the Ikedaya incident and Kinmon incident of 1864, and was able to recover 30,000 koku of his former territories. He also participated in the Chōshū expedition, the suppression of Tenchūgumi and the Mito Rebellion. However, Ii Naonori grew increasingly dissatisfied with the continued hostile treatment still accorded Hikone Domain by the shogunal administration. He also came to the realization that shogunate's military system and equipment was now obsolete compared with the Satchō Alliance. Thus, although Hikone Domain had been one of the strongest supporters of the Tokugawa shogunate and was regarded as first among the fudai daimyō, was among the first to change sides and support the imperial cause in the Boshin War. During the Battle of Toba-Fushimi, although Hikone forces were stationed at Osaka Castle, they did not join the shogunal army, but simply marched home. The domain later took part in combat against the pro-shogunate Ogaki Domain, and in other locations, including the capture of Kondō Isami and suppression of the Shinsengumi. The new Meiji government awarded Hikone an additional 20,000 koku shortly before the abolition of the han system.

In 1871, Ii Naonori traveled to the United States and England, during which time he was attended by Sōma Nagatane, who became the founder of Senshu University.

On 7 July 1884, he received the peerage title of Count under the kazoku system in 1884. In 1885, he was awarded the Order of the Rising Sun, 3rd class and in 1887 was promoted to Third Court Rank. He served as a member of the House of Peers from its inception in 1890 until 1897. He also received the Order of the Rising Sun, 2nd class in 1897.

Ii Naonori was married to Arisugawa-no-miya Yoshiko (1851–1895), the daughter of Prince Arisugawa Takahito. He later married Nabeshima Tsuneko, the daughter of Nabeshima Naotada, former daimyō of Hasunoike Domain. His grave is at the temple of Gōtoku-ji in Setagaya, Tokyo.
