= What Will You Do, Ieyasu? =

2023 Japanese television series

- Written by: Ryota Kosawa
- Directed by: Naoki Murahashi and others
- Starring: Jun Matsumoto; Kasumi Arimura; Junichi Okada; Nanako Matsushima; Keiko Kitagawa; Nao Ōmori; Yuki Yamada; Yosuke Sugino; Rihito Itagaki; Takuma Otoo; Masahiro Kōmoto; Kanata Hosoda; Win Morisaki; Ryūto Sakuma; Nanoka Hara; Gordon Maeda; Junpei Mizobata; Nakamura Shichinosuke; Alice Hirose; Takayuki Yamada; Tsuyoshi Muro; Kenichi Matsuyama; Emi Wakui; Yutaka Matsushige; Mansai Nomura; Hiroshi Abe
- Narrated by: Shinobu Terajima
- Composer: Hibiki Inamoto
- Country of origin: Japan
- Original language: Japanese
- No. of episodes: 48

Production
- Running time: 45 minutes

Original release
- Network: NHK
- Release: January 8 – December 17, 2023

What Will You Do, Ieyasu? (どうする家康, Dousuru Ieyasu; What Would You Do, Ieyasu?) is a Japanese historical drama television series starring Jun Matsumoto as Tokugawa Ieyasu. The series is the 62nd NHK taiga drama.

== Cast ==
=== Starring role ===
- Jun Matsumoto as Tokugawa Ieyasu
  - Waku Kawaguchi as Matsudaira Takechiyo (young Ieyasu)

=== Tokugawa clan ===
- Kasumi Arimura as Sena, Ieyasu's first wife
  - Seiko Utsumi as Sena's double
- Nanako Matsushima as Odai no Kata, Ieyasu's mother
- Kisuke Iida as Matsudaira Hirotada, Ieyasu's father
- Kanata Hosoda as Matsudaira Nobuyasu
  - Mahoro Terajima as Takechiyo (young Nobuyasu)
- Shiori Kubo (Nogizaka46) as Gotoku
  - Natsuki Matsuoka as young Gotoku
- Ami Touma as Kamehime
  - Honoka Yoshida as young Kamehime
- Alice Hirose as Lady Oai
- Yūtarō Iisaku as Saigō Yoshikatsu
- Win Morisaki as Tokugawa Hidetada
  - Rihito Shigematsu as Chōmaru (young Hidetada)
- Maiko as Gō
  - Yūka as young Gō
- Yunho as Takechiyo (young Tokugawa Iemitsu)
- Aoto Ichimura as Fukumatsu (young Matsudaira Tadayoshi)
- Takumi Kizu as Yūki Hideyasu
  - Ryūsei Iwata as Ogii (young Hideyasu)
- Yutaka Matsushige as Ishikawa Kazumasa
- Tae Kimura as Nabe, Kazumasa's wife
- The Four Heavenly Kings of the Tokugawa
  - Nao Ōmori as Sakai Tadatsugu
  - Yuki Yamada as Honda Tadakatsu
  - Yosuke Sugino as Sakakibara Yasumasa
  - Rihito Itagaki as Ii Naomasa
- Kenichi Matsuyama as Honda Masanobu
- Yūki Inoue as Honda Masazumi
- Issey Ogata as Torii Tadayoshi
- Takuma Otoo as Torii Mototada
- Kotone Furukawa as Mochizuki Chiyo, a Kunoichi and a retainer of Takeda Clan, who later became Mototada's second wife
- Shinya Kote as Ōkubo Tadayo
- Akihito Yoshiie as Ōkubo Tadamasu
- Dai Okabe (Hanako) as Hiraiwa Chikayoshi
- Takayuki Yamada as Hattori Hanzō
- Masahiro Kōmoto as Natsume Yoshinobu, a.k.a. Natsume Hirotsugu
- Kazuki Namioka as Honda Tadazane
- Subaru Kimura as Watanabe Moritsuna
- Tetsuya Chiba as Ōnezumi
- Marika Matsumoto as Onna-ōnezumi
- Kazuo Kawabata as Anaguma
- Tsubaki Nekoze as Toyo
- Kana Kita as Oyō
- Asahi Seino as Ofū
- Shuri Nakamura as Miyo
- Rena Matsui as Oman
- Katsuya Maiguma as Ōoka Yashirō
- Kenta Nitta as Ban Yoshichirō
- Takato Yonemoto as Yamada Hachizō
- Wakana Matsumoto as Lady Acha
- Tatsumasa Murasame as William Adams, a.k.a. Miura Anjin
- Takeshi Nadagi as Ina Tadatsugu
- Ryōsei Tayama as Konchi'in Sūden
- Tetsuo (Waraimeshi) as Hayashi Razan
- Maiko Itō
- Shinobu Terajima as Lady Kasuga/narrator
- Shun Oguri as Nankōbō Tenkai

=== Imagawa clan ===
- Mansai Nomura as Imagawa Yoshimoto. He was like a father to Ieyasu.
- Junpei Mizobata as Imagawa Ujizane
  - Kuon Kazui as Tatsuō-maru (young Ujizane)
- Mirai Shida as Ito
- Atsuro Watabe as Sekiguchi Ujizumi
- Miki Maya as Tomoe
- Hana Toyoshima as Tane
- Nagisa Sekimizu as Otazu
- Gōta Watabe as Iio Tsuratatsu
- Tōru Nomaguchi as Udono Nagateru
- Uta Yorikawa as Udono Ujinaga
- Sera Ishida as Udono Ujitsugu
- Hiroyuki Amano as Yamada Shin'emon
- Kenichi Yajima as Kira Yoshiakira
- Miou Tanaka as Okabe Motonobu

=== Oda clan ===
- Junichi Okada as Oda Nobunaga
  - Kira Miura as young Nobunaga
- Hiroshi Fujioka as Oda Nobuhide, Nobunaga's father
- Yoshi Sakou as Akechi Mitsuhide
- Mitsuo Yoshihara as Shibata Katsuie
- Tatekawa Danshun as Sakuma Nobumori
- Satoshi Tokushige as Ikeda Tsuneoki
- Kenta Hamano as Oda Nobukatsu
- Tomohiro Yoshida as Oda Nobutaka
- Akira Fukuzawa as Niwa Nagahide
- Yu Shirota as Mori Nagayoshi
- Riku Ōnishi as Mori Ran, a.k.a. Mori Ranmaru
- Nozomi Makino as Hirate Masahide
- Aoi Hamada as Sanbōshi

=== Toyotomi clan ===
- Tsuyoshi Muro as Toyotomi Hideyoshi
- Emi Wakui as Nene
- Keiko Kitagawa as Yodo-dono and her mother Oichi
  - Tamaki Shiratori as Chacha (young Yodo-dono)
  - Yūwa Kamimura as young Oichi
- Ryūto Sakuma (HiHi Jets) as Toyotomi Hideyori
- Nanoka Hara as Senhime
- Atsuko Takahata as Naka
- Ryuta Sato as Toyotomi Hidenaga
- Maho Yamada as Asahi
- Nakamura Shichinosuke II as Ishida Mitsunari
- Yasushi Fuchikami as Katō Kiyomasa
- Motoki Fukami as Fukushima Masanori
- Shugo Oshinari as Ōtani Yoshitsugu
- Mansaku Ikeuchi as Konishi Yukinaga
- Tsutomu Takahashi as Shima Sakon
- Shinnosuke Abe as Kuroda Nagamasa
- Kozo Takeda as Hachisuka Iemasa
- Rin Amikawa as Tōdō Takatora
- Shin'ya Yamamaru as Yamauchi Kazutoyo
- Takayuki Hamatsu as Asano Nagamasa
- Seminosuke Murasugi as Maeda Gen'i
- Yōhei Kumabe as Mashita Nagamori
- Ikuma Nagatomo as Natsuka Masaie
- Denden as Saishō Jōtai
- Masato Yamashita as Toyotomi Hidetsugu
- Yoshito Kobashigawa as Hori Hidemasa
- Riku Kashima as Kobayakawa Hideaki
- Jun'ya Kawashima as Katagiri Katsumoto
- Tetsuji Tamayama as Ōno Harunaga
- Hacizō Hino as Chōsokabe Morichika
- Takuma Sugawara as Mōri Yoshimasa, a.k.a. Mōri Katsunaga
- Ryūhei Higashiyama as Ōtani Yoshikatsu
- Ken Kurahara as Gotō Matabei
- Hisato Kojima as Akashi Teruzumi
- Shinobu Otake as Ōkurakyō no Tsubone

=== Council of Five Elders (Go-Tairō) ===
- Shin Takuma as Maeda Toshiie
- Mitsuru Fukikoshi as Mōri Terumoto
- Kanji Tsuda as Uesugi Kagekatsu
- Shuntaro Yanagi as Ukita Hideie

=== Takeda clan ===
- Hiroshi Abe as Takeda Shingen
- Gordon Maeda as Takeda Katsuyori
- Satoshi Hashimoto as Yamagata Masakage
- Seiichi Tanabe as Anayama Baisetsu

=== Sanada clan ===
- Kōichi Satō as Sanada Masayuki
- Kaito Yoshimura as Sanada Nobuyuki
- Yui Narumi as Ina, Nobuyuki's wife and Honda Tadakatsu's daughter
- Wataru Hyuga as Sanada Nobushige, later known as Sanada "Saemonosuke" Yukimura

=== Others ===
- Kōtarō Satomi as Tōyo-shōnin
- Ichikawa Udanji III as Kūsei-shōnin
- Arata Furuta as Ashikaga Yoshiaki, the final shogun of the Ashikaga shogunate
- Yūsuke Ōnuki as Azai Nagamasa
- Anne Suzuki as Hatsu
  - Rin Furukawa as young Hatsu
- Aoi Itō as Azuki
- Susumu Terajima as Mizuno Nobumoto
- Lily Franky as Hisamatsu Toshikatsu
- Kento Nagao (Naniwa Danshi) as Hisamatsu Katsutoshi
- Akihiro Kakuta (Tokyo 03) as Matsudaira Masahisa
- Nakamura Kankurō VI as Chaya Shirōjirō Kiyonobu and his son Kiyotada
- Jin Shirasu as Okudaira Nobumasa
- Taiiku Okazaki as Torii Suneemon
- Manami Igashira as Otama
- Ai Tenshō as Ofū
- Amane Tenshō as Orin
- Rie Shibata as an old lady selling dumplings.
- Kenji Yamagami as Tsuda Sōgyū
- Kazu Murakami as Matsui Yūkan
- Kyusaku Shimada as Momochi Tanba
- Kitarō as Tarao Mitsutoshi
- Arisa Nakajima as Ii Hiyo
- Taro Suruga as Hōjō Ujimasa
- Jun Nishiyama as Hōjō Ujinao
- Takahiro as Naoe Kanetsugu
- Tsuyoshi Hayakawa as Maeda Toshinaga
- Tomonori Mizuno as Hijikata Katsuhisa
- Kenji Inoue as Kikkawa Hiroie

== TV schedule ==
Episode	Title	Directed by	Original airdate	Rating
1	"Dousuru Okehazama" (どうする桶狭間)	Taku Katō	January 8, 2023	15.4%
2	"Usagi to Ookami" (兎と狼)	Naoki Murahashi	January 15, 2023	15.3%
3	"Mikawa Heitei-sen" (三河平定戦)	Naoki Murahashi	January 22, 2023	14.8%
4	"Kiyosu de Dousuru!" (清須でどうする！)	Naoki Murahashi	January 29, 2023	13.9%
5	"Sena Dakkan Sakusen" (瀬名奪還作戦)	Taku Katō	February 5, 2023	12.9%
6	"Zoku Sena Dakkan Sakusen" (続・瀬名奪還作戦)	Takeshi Kawakami	February 12, 2023	13.3%
7	"Washi no Ie" (わしの家)	Michi Ono	February 19, 2023	13.1%
8	"Mikawa-Ikki de Dousuru!" (三河一揆でどうする！)	Takeshi Kawakami	February 26, 2023	12.1%
9	"Mamorubeki Mono" (守るべきもの)	Michi Ono	March 5, 2023	11.8%
10	"Sokushitsu o Dousuru!" (側室をどうする！)	Michi Ono	March 12, 2023	7.2%
11	"Shingen tono Mitsuyaku" (信玄との密約)	Naoki Murahashi	March 19, 2023	10.9%
12	"Ujizane" (氏真)	Naoki Murahashi	March 26, 2023	11.0%
13	"Ieyasu, Miyako e Yuku" (家康、都へゆく)	Takeshi Kawakami	April 2, 2023	11.0%
14	"Kanegasaki de Dousuru!" (金ヶ崎でどうする！)	Takeshi Kawakami	April 16, 2023	11.4%
15	"Anegawa de Dousuru!" (姉川でどうする！)	Satoshi Tanaka	April 23, 2023	11.1%
16	"Shingen o Okoraseruna" (信玄を怒らせるな)	Taku Katō	April 30, 2023	10.7%
17	"Mikatagahara Kassen" (三方ヶ原合戦)	Michi Ono	May 7, 2023	10.1%
18	"Shin Mikatagahara Kassen" (真・三方ヶ原合戦)	Naoki Murahashi	May 14, 2023	10.9%
19	"Otetsuki shite Dousuru" (お手付きしてどうする)	Taku Katō	May 21, 2023	11.5%
20	"Okazaki Coup d'état" (岡崎クーデター)	Yūdai Noguchi	May 28, 2023	10.4%
21	"Nagashino o Sukue!" (長篠を救え！)	Takeshi Kawakami	June 4, 2023	10.8%
22	"Shitaragahara no Tatakai" (設楽原の戦い)	Satoshi Tanaka	June 11, 2023	10.8%
23	"Sena, Kakusei" (瀬名、覚醒)	Michi Ono	June 18, 2023	10.2%
24	"Tsukiyama e Tsudoe" (築山へ集え)	Taku Katō	June 25, 2023	10.0%
25	"Haruka ni Tōi Yume" (はるかに遠い夢)	Naoki Murahashi	July 2, 2023	10.6%
26	"Burari Fuji Yūran" (ぶらり富士遊覧)	Takeshi Kawakami	July 9, 2023	10.7%
27	"Azuchi-jō no Kettō" (安土城の決闘)	Taku Katō	July 16, 2023	10.0%
28	"Honnō-ji no Hen" (本能寺の変)	Naoki Murahashi	July 23, 2023	12.7%
29	"Iga o Koero!" (伊賀を越えろ！)	Takeshi Kawakami	July 30, 2023	11.5%
30	"Aratanaru Hasha" (新たなる覇者)	Yūdai Noguchi	August 6, 2023	9.4%
31	"Shijō-saidai no Kessen" (史上最大の決戦)	Satoshi Tanaka	August 13, 2023	10.1%
32	"Komaki-Nagakute no Gekitō" (小牧長久手の激闘)	Taku Katō	August 20, 2023	10.2%
33	"Uragirimono" (裏切り者)	Taku Katō	August 27, 2023	10.1%
34	"Toyotomi no Hanayome" (豊臣の花嫁)	Michi Ono	September 3, 2023	11.7%
35	"Yokubō no Kaibutsu" (欲望の怪物)	Naoki Murahashi	September 17, 2023	10.1%
36	"Oai Nikki" (於愛日記)	Naoki Murahashi	September 24, 2023	9.9%
37	"Saraba Mikawa-kashin-dan" (さらば三河家臣団)	Takeshi Kawakami	October 1, 2023	10.1%
38	"Kara-iri" (唐入り)	Toki Kajiwara	October 8, 2023	7.4%
39	"Taikō, Kutabaru" (太閤、くたばる)	Naoki Murahashi	October 15, 2023	10.4%
40	"Tenkabito Ieyasu" (天下人家康)	Yūdai Noguchi	October 22, 2023	11.1%
41	"Gyakushū no Mitsunari" (逆襲の三成)	Satoshi Tanaka	October 29, 2023	10.1%
42	"Tenka Wakeme" (天下分け目)	Takeshi Kawakami	November 5, 2023	10.0%
43	"Sekigahara no Tatakai" (関ヶ原の戦い)	Toki Kajiwara	November 12, 2023	11.9%
44	"Tokugawa-Bakufu Tanjō" (徳川幕府誕生)	Naoki Murahashi	November 19, 2023	11.0%
45	"Futari no Prince" (二人のプリンス)	Satoshi Tanaka	November 26, 2023	11.6%
46	"Ōsaka no Jin" (大坂の陣)	Shūsuke Nakamura	December 3, 2023	11.6%
47	"Ranse no Bōrei" (乱世の亡霊)	Takeshi Kawakami	December 10, 2023	11.0%
48	"Kami no Kimi e" (神の君へ)	Naoki Murahashi	December 17, 2023	12.3%
Average rating 11.2% - Rating is based on Japanese Video Research (Kantō region).

=== Omnibus ===
Episode	Title	Original airdate	Original airtime
1	"Hajimari no Toki" (始まりのとき)	December 29, 2023	13:05 - 14:14
2	"Shiren no Toki" (試練のとき)	December 29, 2023	14:14 - 15:24
3	"Yakudō no Toki" (躍動のとき)	December 29, 2023	15:29 - 16:39
4	"Kakugo no Toki" (覚悟のとき)	December 29, 2023	16:39 - 17:49

== Reception ==
The show has the second worst viewerships rating Taiga drama since NHK launched its first historical drama show. The reason was stated that although younger generation of NHK drama viewers increased, the older generations received the show negatively due to the portrayal of Ieyasu being timid and the sympathetic portrayal of Lady Tsukiyama, contrary to the traditional image of both characters since Edo period. Furthermore, this show has garnered mixed views from history academics since it depicted many historical inaccuracies.

An NHK employee insider told Daily Shinchō news that one notable controversy stemmed from the airing "LGBT episode". The said employee said many of the young Japanese people nowaday prefers serious programs such as news reports and documentaries. For this reason, that episode has stirred mixed reactions within the station, with some saying "it may not be resonating with viewers.". Tetsuo Owada, professor emeritus of Shizuoka University who also act as consultant for the series, has noted this creative take of depiction for the female same-sex couple during Sengoku period was never heard before, and he admit he "was quite surprised" with such liberty take when he read the script of the episode.

Another consultant of the show and Sengoku period professor Shiba Hiroyuki criticized the inaccuracy of how Kiyosu Castle portrayed.

Japanese columnist and professional critic Kazuo Yawata opined that the show failed to bridge the historical accuracy with the traditional portrayal of Ieyasu as someone who endures hardship, resulting in the inconsistency of his characterization in the show.
