= Nagashino =

Nagashino may refer to:

- Nagashino castle, a Sengoku period Japanese castle located in eastern Aichi Prefecture, Japan
- Battle of Nagashino, 1575, near Nagashino Castle in Mikawa Province, Japan
