= Michihisa =

- Gender: Male

Origin
- Origin: Japanese
- Meaning: Different meanings depending on the kanji used

Michihisa (written: 倫央 or 道久) is a masculine Japanese given name. Notable people with the name include:

- Michihisa Date (伊達 倫央) (born 1966), Japanese footballer
- Ochiai Michihisa (落合 道久), Japanese samurai
- Michihisa Onoda, (born 1978) Japanese tennis player
