= Yoshii Domain =

Feudal domain in Edo period Japan

Yoshii Domain 吉井藩
- Domain of Japan
- 1590–1610; 1682–1698; 1709–1869
- Capital: Yoshii jin'ya
  - Type: Daimyō
- Historical era: Edo period
  - Established: 1590
  - Disestablished: 1869
Preceded by	Succeeded by
Kōzuke Province	Iwahana Prefecture
- Today part of: Gunma Prefecture

Yoshii Domain (吉井藩, Yoshii-han) was a feudal domain under the Tokugawa shogunate of Edo period Japan, located in Kōzuke Province (modern-day Gunma Prefecture), Japan. It was centered on Yoshii jin'ya in what is now part of the city of Takasaki, Gunma. Yoshii was ruled through much of its history by a branch of the Takatsukasa clan, which had adopted the patronym of Matsudaira.

== History ==
After Tokugawa Ieyasu took control over the Kantō region in 1590, he assigned one of his generals, Sugawara Sadatoshi, the 20,000 koku holding of Yoshii. Sadatoshi laid out the foundations of a town and market, and was succeeded by his adopted son, Okudaira Tadamasa in 1602. Tadamasa’s mother was the eldest daughter of Tokugawa Ieyasu; he was transferred to Kanō Domain in 1610. The domain then became vacant and was ruled as a hatamoto holding until 1682.

In 1682, Hotta Masayasu, a hatamoto bureaucrat in the Tokugawa shogunate, passed the 10,000 koku mark and was raised in status to daimyō. Yoshii Domain was revived to be his seat, but he was transferred to Omi-Miyagawa domain, where his descendants resided to the Meiji restoration, and Yoshii again reverted to tenryō status.

Likewise, in 1709, the hatamoto Matsudaira Nobukiyo attained the 10,000 koku mark, and Yoshii Domain was revived as his seat. Nobukiyo was the grandson of the kuge Takatsukasa Nobuhira, whose sister married Shōgun Tokugawa Iemitsu. He traveled to Edo with only one retainer, but was awarded estates and servants and eventually married a daughter of Tokugawa Yorinobu and adopted the Matsudaira name. The descendants of Matsudaira Nobukiyo continued to rule Yoshii until the end of the Edo period.

During the Bakumatsu period, the final daimyō, Matsudaira Nobunori, changed his name to Yoshii Nobunori, and joined the new Meiji government in February 1868. With the abolition of the han system in July 1871, Yoshii Domain became part of “Iwahana Prefecture”, which later became part of Gunma Prefecture.

== Holdings at the end of the Edo period ==
As with most domains in the han system, Yoshii Domain consisted of several discontinuous territories calculated to provide the assigned kokudaka, based on periodic cadastral surveys and projected agricultural yields.

- Kōzuke Province
  - 1 village in Kanra District
  - 6 villages in Tago District
  - 10 villages in Midono District
  - 1 village in Nawa District
  - 7 villages in Gunma District
  - 1 village in Seta District
- Kazusa Province
  - 3 villages in Isumi District
  - 3 villages in Nagara District

== List of daimyō ==
#	Name	Tenure	Courtesy title	Court Rank	kokudaka
Suganuma clan (Fudai) 1590–1610
1	Suganuma Sadatoshi (菅沼定利)	1590–1602	Daizen-no-suke (大膳亮)	Lower 5th (従五 位下)	20,000 koku
2	Suganuma Tadamasa (菅沼忠政)	1602–1610	Hida-no-kami (飛騨守)	Lower 5th (従五 位下)	20,000 koku
tenryō 1610–1682
Hotta clan (fudai) 1682–1693
1	Hotta Masayasu (堀田正休)	1682–1693	Buzen-no-kami (豊前守)	Lower 5th (従五位下)	10,000 koku
tenryō 1693–1709
Takatsukasa-Matsudaira clan (shimpan) 1709–1871
1	Matsudaira Nobukiyo (松平信清)	1709–1724	Echizen-no-kami(越前守); Jijū (侍従)	Lower 4th (従四位下)	10,000 koku
2	Matsudaira Nobutomo (松平信友)	1724–1760	Echizen-no-kami(越前守); Jijū (侍従)	Lower 4th (従四位下)	10,000 koku
3	Matsudaira Nobuari (松平信有)	1760–1771	Sahyōe-no-kami (左兵衛督); Jijū (侍従)	Lower 4th (従四位下)	10,000 koku
4	Matsudaira Nobuakira (松平信明)	1771–1775	Sahyōe-no-kami (左兵衛督); Jijū (侍従)	Lower 4th (従四位下)	10,000 koku
5	Matsudaira Nobushige (松平信成)	1775–1800	Sahyōe-no-kami (左兵衛督); Jijū (侍従)	Lower 4th (従四位下)	10,000 koku
6	Matsudaira Nobumitsu (松平信充)	1800–1803	Sahyōe-no-kami (左兵衛督); Jijū (侍従)	Lower 4th (従四位下)	10,000 koku
7	Matsudairai Nobuyoshi (松平信敬)	1803–1841	Sahyōe-no-kami (左兵衛督); Jijū (侍従)	Lower 4th (従四位下)	10,000 koku
8	Matsudaira Nobutada (松平信任)	1841–1847	Sahyōe-no-kami (左兵衛督); Jijū (侍従)	Lower 4th (従四位下)	10,000 koku
9	Matsudaira Nobuoki (松平信発)	1847–1865	Sahyōe-no-kami (左兵衛督); Jijū (侍従)	Lower 5th (従五位下)	10,000 koku
10	Matsudaira Nobunori (松平信謹)	1865–1871	Sahyōe-no-kami (左兵衛督); Jijū (侍従)	Lower 4th (従四位下)	10,000 koku
