= 貞昌 =

貞昌 may refer to:

- Okudaira Nobumasa (1555 – 1615) called Okudaira Sadamasa (奥平 貞昌), Japanese daimyō of the Sengoku and early Edo periods
- Su Tseng-chang (born 1947), Taiwanese politician
