= Honda Masanobu =

Japanese military commander and daimyo (1538–1616)

- 本多 正信
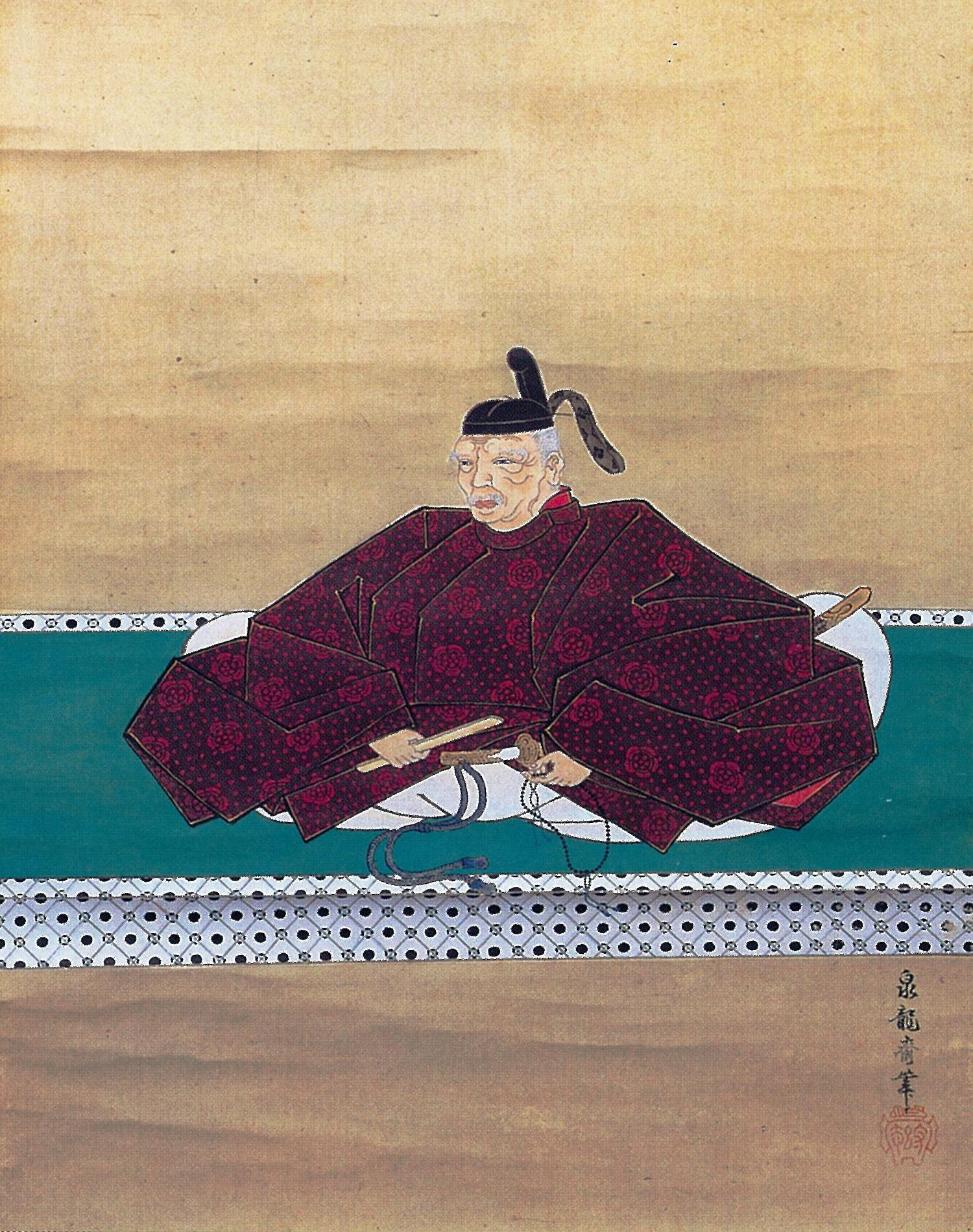

Daimyō of Tamanawa
- In office 1590–1616
- Succeeded by: Matsudaira Masatsuna

Personal details
- Born: 1538 Mikawa Province, Japan
- Died: July 20, 1616 (aged 77–78) Edo, Japan
- Resting place: Nishi Hongan-ji, Kyoto, Japan

Military service
- Allegiance: Tokugawa clan Tokugawa shogunate
- Battles/wars: Battle of Azukizaka (1564); Battle of Komaki-Nagakute (1584); Siege of Ueda (1600); Siege of Osaka (1614)

Honda Masanobu (本多 正信; 1538 – July 20, 1616) was a commander and daimyō in the service of Tokugawa Ieyasu in Japan during the Azuchi-Momoyama and Edo periods.

Masanobu was held in high regard by Matsunaga Hisahide, who viewed him as a rarity among Tokugawa's samurai who mostly known for their martial prowess. However is said that other Tokugawa vassals disliked Masanobu, such as Sakakibara Yasumasa who regarded him as "corrupt", and Honda Tadakatsu thought Masanobu as a coward. Furthermore, Kamehime, Ieyasu's eldest daughter, also held a grudge towards Masanobu, as she blamed him for the fall of Okubo Tadachika, the father-in-law of Kamehime's daughter, during the "Okubo clan's affair" incident around 1613-1614.

In his later life, Masanobu advised his son, Masazumi, to never accept the shogun's offer to increase his domain to be more than 30,000-koku.

== Biography ==
In 1563, when an uprising against Ieyasu occurred in Mikawa Province, Masanobu and his brother, Masashige the elder, took the side of the peasants against Ieyasu at Battle of Batogahara. After Ieyasu suppressed the Ikko rebels, Masanobu fled from Mikawa and settled in Kaga Province.

Later, he rejoined Tokugawa in the 1570s or 1580s at the behest of Ōkubo Tadayo, and accompanied Ieyasu as he crossed Iga Province following the assassination of Oda Nobunaga at Honnō-ji.

In 1600, Masanobu joined Tokugawa Hidetada for the march along the Nakasendō. En route, however, Hidetada attacked Sanada Masayuki at Ueda Castle against Masanobu's advice, and together they arrived late for the Battle of Sekigahara.

Masanobu was a member of the Tokugawa shogunate and ruled a Han in Sagami Province assessed at 22,000 koku. He was present at the siege of Osaka in 1614. Masanobu died several weeks after Ieyasu in 1616.

=== Masanobu's sons ===
Masanobu's eldest son, Honda Masazumi, fought at the Battle of Sekigahara and the Battle of Osaka. He served the Tokugawa shogunate until 1622.

In 1597, Masanobu's 18-year-old second son, Masashige, got into a dispute with Okabe Souhachi, son of Tokugawa Hidetada's wet nurse, and killed him before fleeing. Masashige then entered service under Ōtani Yoshitsugu for two years.

Masanobu's third son (also known as Honda Daigaku, Ōsumi no kami) was awarded a 10,000-koku domain in Shimotsuke Province in 1605, which was doubled to 20,000 koku in 1615.

Preceded by none	Daimyō of Tamanawa; 1590–1616	Succeeded by Matsudaira Masatsuna
