= Kanō Castle =

- 加納城
- Gifu, Gifu Prefecture, Japan
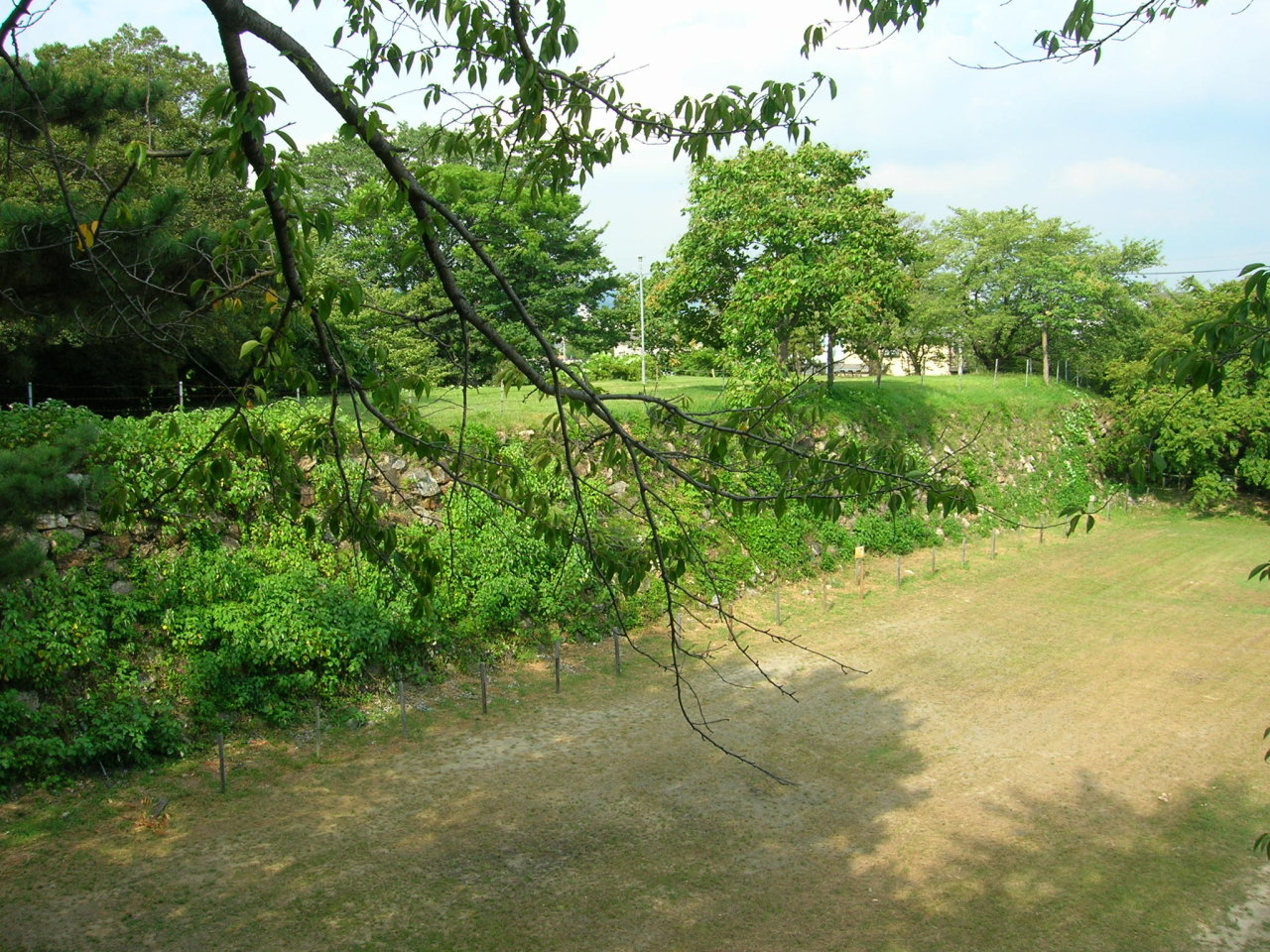
- Ruins of Kanō Castle

Site information
- Type: hirajiro-style Japanese castle
- Open to the public: yes
- Condition: ruins

Location
- Kanō Castle Kanō Castle (Japan)
- Coordinates: 35°23′58″N 136°45′37″E

Site history
- Built: 1602
- Built by: Okudaira Nobumasa
- In use: Edo period
- Demolished: 1871

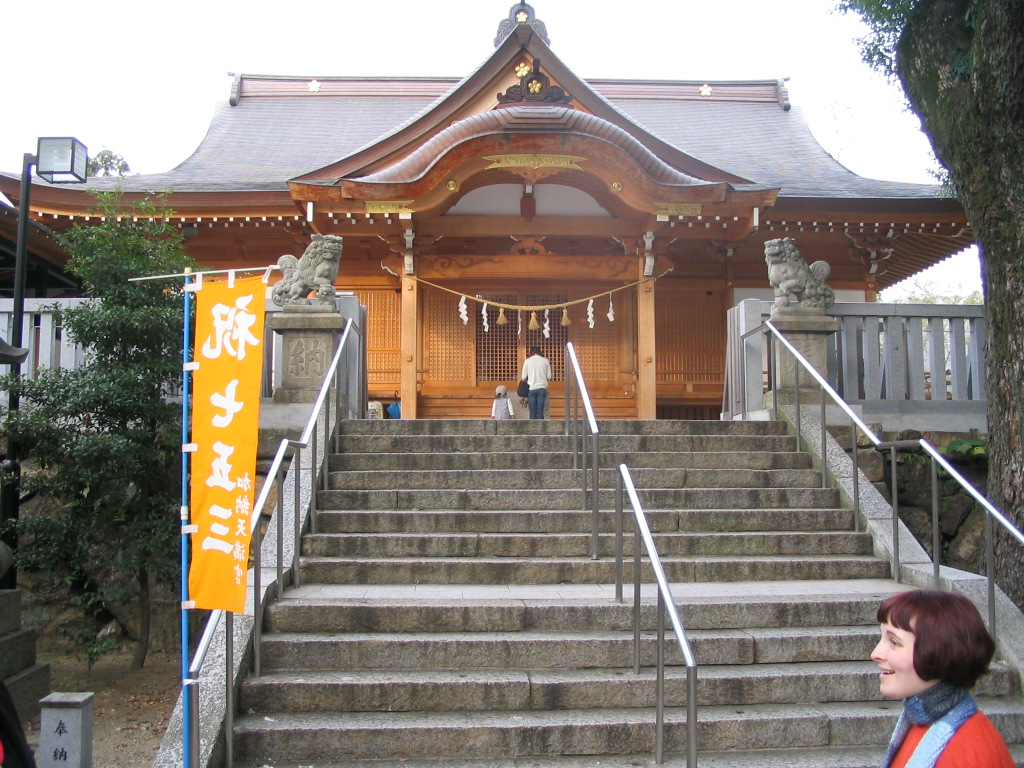
Kanō Tenman-gū

Kanō Castle (加納城, Kanō-jō) was a hirajirō-style Japanese castle located in the city of Gifu, Gifu Prefecture, Japan. It was one of the few castles built after the Battle of Sekigahara and establishment of the Tokugawa shogunate and was used as an administrative center of Kanō Domain under the end of the Edo period, but only its ruins, including the base of the tenshu and stone walls, remain today. The ruins were designated National Historic Site in 1983.

== Structure ==
Kanō Castle is a long and narrow structure, approximately 550 meters north-to-south by 400 meters east-to-west) with a double moat. The main gate of the castle was on the north side, facing the Nakasendō highway. The inner moat completely surrounded the main enclosure, and the outer moat was the Arata River to the east, the Shimizu River to the north, and connecting moats on the west and south. The castle town was located to the east, and the shukuba of Kanō-juku was located on the north.

The main enclosure was square, with a protruding outer box. This is one of the characteristics of the early Tokugawa castles, this castle was thus the template for "Kanō-type castles" subsequently built at other locations. The yagura in the northeast corner of the Ni-no-maru second bailey served in lieu of a tenshu. It was destroyed in 1728 and never rebuilt.

== History ==
Kanō Castle is located south of the city of Gifu, and controlled the roads between Mino Province and the Kansai region of Japan. The first construction of Kanō Castle began in 1445 by Saitō Toshinaga, who was a vassal of the Toki clan. However, this castle was already abandoned by 1538.

Following the Battle of Sekigahara, the victorious Tokugawa Ieyasu awarded Gifu Castle to his son-in-law, Okudaira Nobumasa. However, due to its poor state of repair, Nobumasa decided to abolish Gifu Castle and to relocate to a new castle built on the site of the old Kanō Castle. This new structure was completed in 1603 in record time, as Ieyasu had ordered various daimyō to contribute materials, labor and money for its construction, and the largest three-story yagura was transferred from Gifu Castle to be its tenshu. The design of the castle was also kept simple, with a minimal number of towers, as the castle was being constructed as a center of local administration in peacetime.

The Kanō Tenman-gū, was built simultaneously with the castle, as a private place of worship for the Okudaira family. Because it was located in a popular post town, Kanō-juku, policies were eventually changed so that commoners could worship there too.

Throughout the Edo period, Kanō Castle served as the center of Kanō Domain, and was ruled by a series of fudai daimyō. After the Meiji restoration, in 1872 all remaining buildings of the castle were destroyed, its moats filled in, and the outer areas of the castle were sold off. In 1900, the Gifu Prefectural Normal School was built on the site of the inner bailey and in 1939 it became the headquarters of the Imperial Japanese Army 51st Air Division. After the end of the war, it continued as a military base of the Japan Ground Self-Defense Force from 1954 to 1975. After the area was proclaimed a National Historic Site in 1983, it was excavated, and the foundations of many structures, stone wall, well and a large amount of earthenware shards were discovered. The site was backfilled after excavation and is now a park.

All that remains of the castle are fragments of stone walls and a portion of the moat. The castle site is a 15 minutes walk from Gifu Station on the JR Central Tōkaidō Main Line.

== Gallery ==
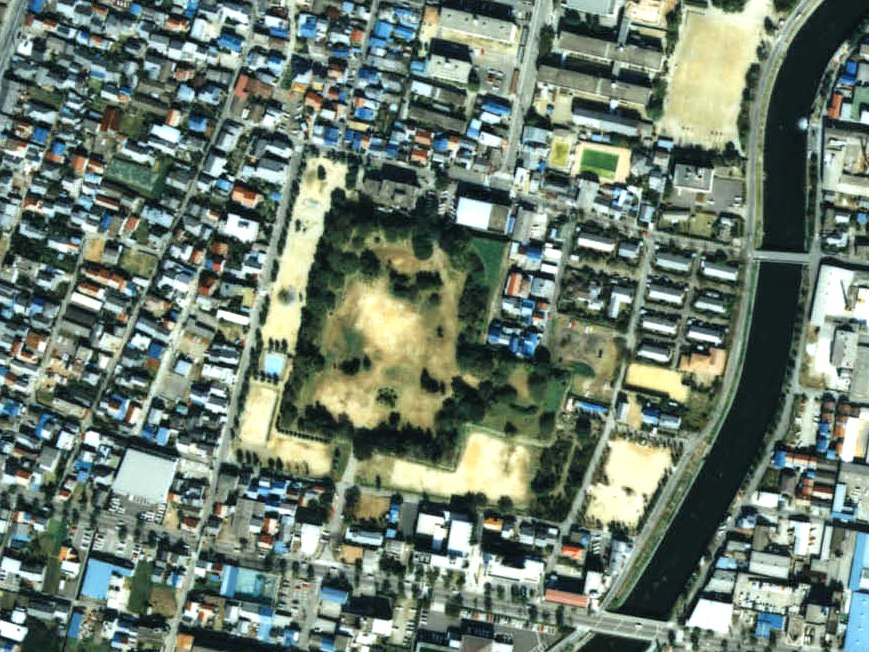
Aerial Photo of Kanō Castle

Design of the tenshu

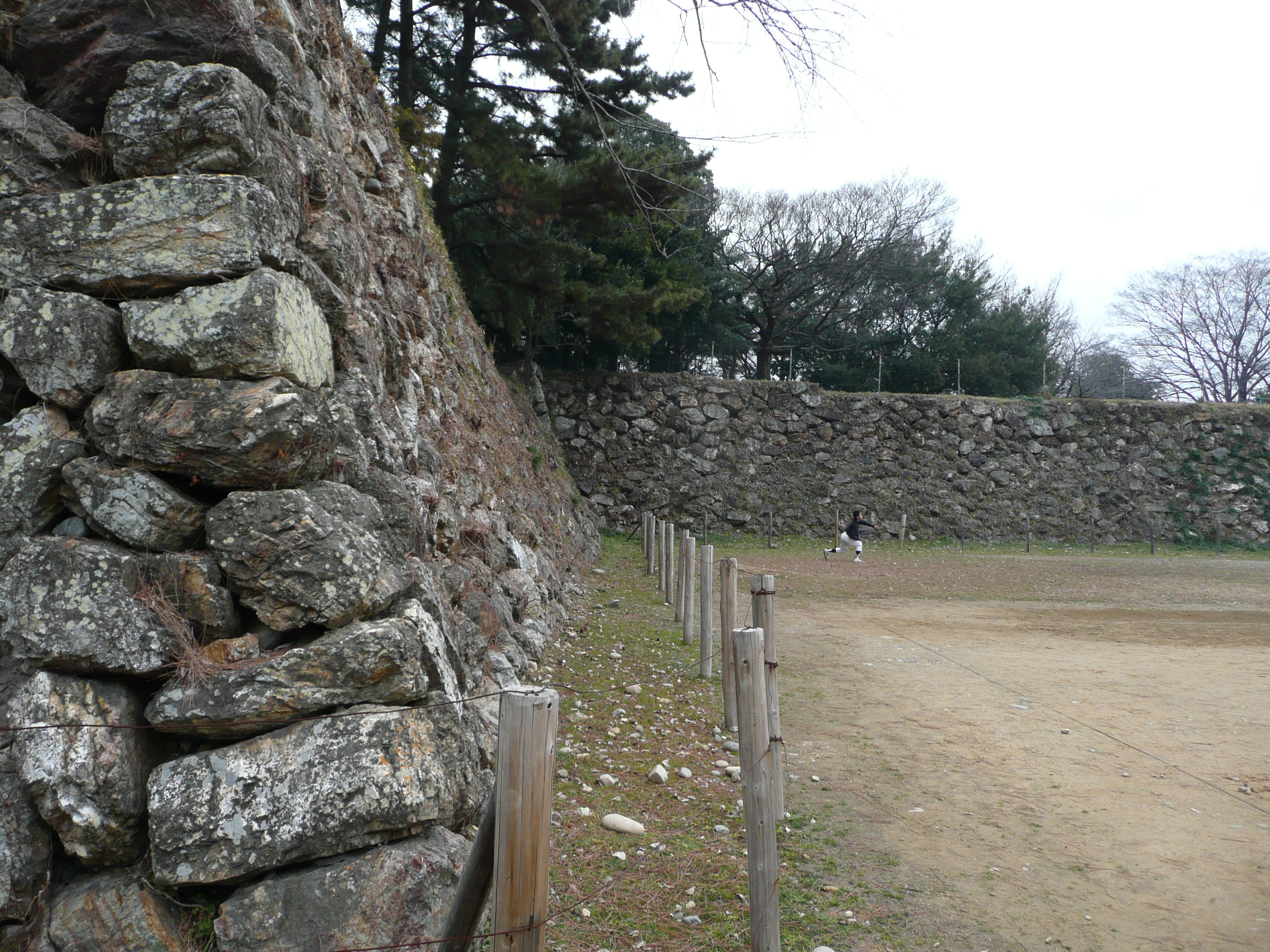
Surviving stone walls

== See also ==
- List of Historic Sites of Japan (Gifu)

== Literature ==
- De Lange, William (2021). An Encyclopedia of Japanese Castles. Groningen: Toyo Press. pp. 600 pages. ISBN 978-9492722300.
- Schmorleitz, Morton S. (1974). Castles in Japan. Tokyo: Charles E. Tuttle Co. pp. 144–145. ISBN 0-8048-1102-4.
- Motoo, Hinago (1986). Japanese Castles. Tokyo: Kodansha. p. 200 pages. ISBN 0-87011-766-1.
- Mitchelhill, Jennifer (2004). Castles of the Samurai: Power and Beauty. Tokyo: Kodansha. p. 112 pages. ISBN 4-7700-2954-3.
- Turnbull, Stephen (2003). Japanese Castles 1540-1640. Osprey Publishing. p. 64 pages. ISBN 1-84176-429-9.
