= Lady Tsukiyama =

Japanese noble lady and aristocrat

- 築山殿
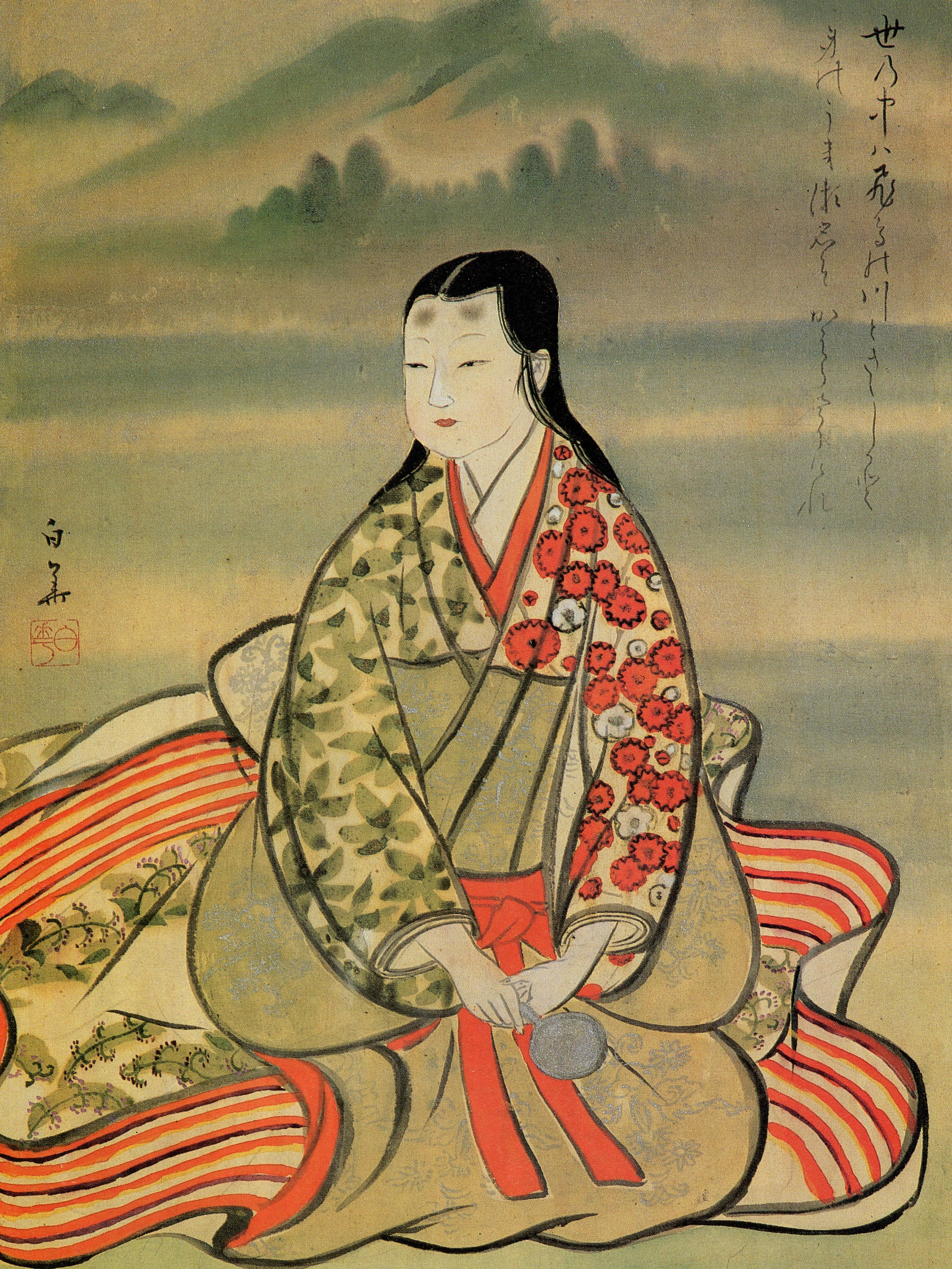
- Died: 19 September 1579; Totomi, Japan
- Resting place: Yahashira Shrine
- Spouse: Tokugawa Ieyasu
- Children: Matsudaira Nobuyasu (son); Kamehime (daughter)
- Family: Imagawa clan (by paternal birth); Ii clan (by maternal birth); Tokugawa clan (by marriage)

Lady Tsukiyama or Tsukiyama-dono (築山殿; d. 19 September 1579) was a Japanese noble lady and aristocrat from the Sengoku period. She was the chief consort of Tokugawa Ieyasu, the daimyō who would become the founder and first shōgun of the Tokugawa shogunate. She was the mother of Ieyasu's first child, Kamehime, and gave birth to Ieyasu's heir apparent, Matsudaira Nobuyasu. As principal consort, Tsukiyama led many of the political achievements of the former Matsudaira clan. She was an important figure at the beginning of Ieyasu's career, who later led to the beginning of Tokugawa Shogunate. She is best known for possibly initiating a conspiracy against Oda Nobunaga. Whether or not she cheated Ieyasu into joining the Takeda clan; the veracity of this event remains one of the greatest mysteries of the Sengoku period, known as the Nobuyasu Incident.

== Life ==
Lady Tsukiyama was the daughter of Sekiguchi Chikanaga, an Imagawa retainer. Her mother was Imagawa Yoshimoto's former concubine and daughter of Ii Naohira. Lady Tsukiyama was also known as Sena (瀬名) before she married Tokugawa Ieyasu, however, the name Sena is not found in historical materials from that time or even in historical materials established in the early Edo period. In Volume 3 of the "Butoku Hennen Shusei" compiled in 1740 in the middle of the Edo period, it is stated that "Lady Tsukiyama was also called Sekiguchi or Sena''. This might originate from her father, Sekiguchi Chikanaga who was from the Sena clan of the Imagawa clan. Therefore, her real name is actually unknown.

Lady Tsukiyama was related to Ii Naotora from Ii clan. Her actions were vital for the Ii clan to ally with Ieyasu. The Ii family members became one of the most important retainers of the Tokugawa shogunate.

In January 1557, Lady Tsukiyama married Tokugawa Ieyasu. The marriage was arranged by Imagawa Yoshimoto, ostensibly to help cement ties between the Imagawa clan and the Tokugawa clan. Two years later, on 13 March 1559, she gave birth to Ieyasu's eldest son, Matsudaira Nobuyasu. In 1560, she gave birth to a daughter, Kamehime.

When Ieyasu moved to Hamamatsu in 1570, he left Lady Tsukiyama and their eldest son at Okazaki Castle. During this time, he had started an affair with Lady Saigō. In 1573, one of Tsukiyama's maid servants, Oman, became pregnant by Ieyasu. Oman bore him a son, Hideyasu, though Ieyasu was slow to claim lest it anger his wife.

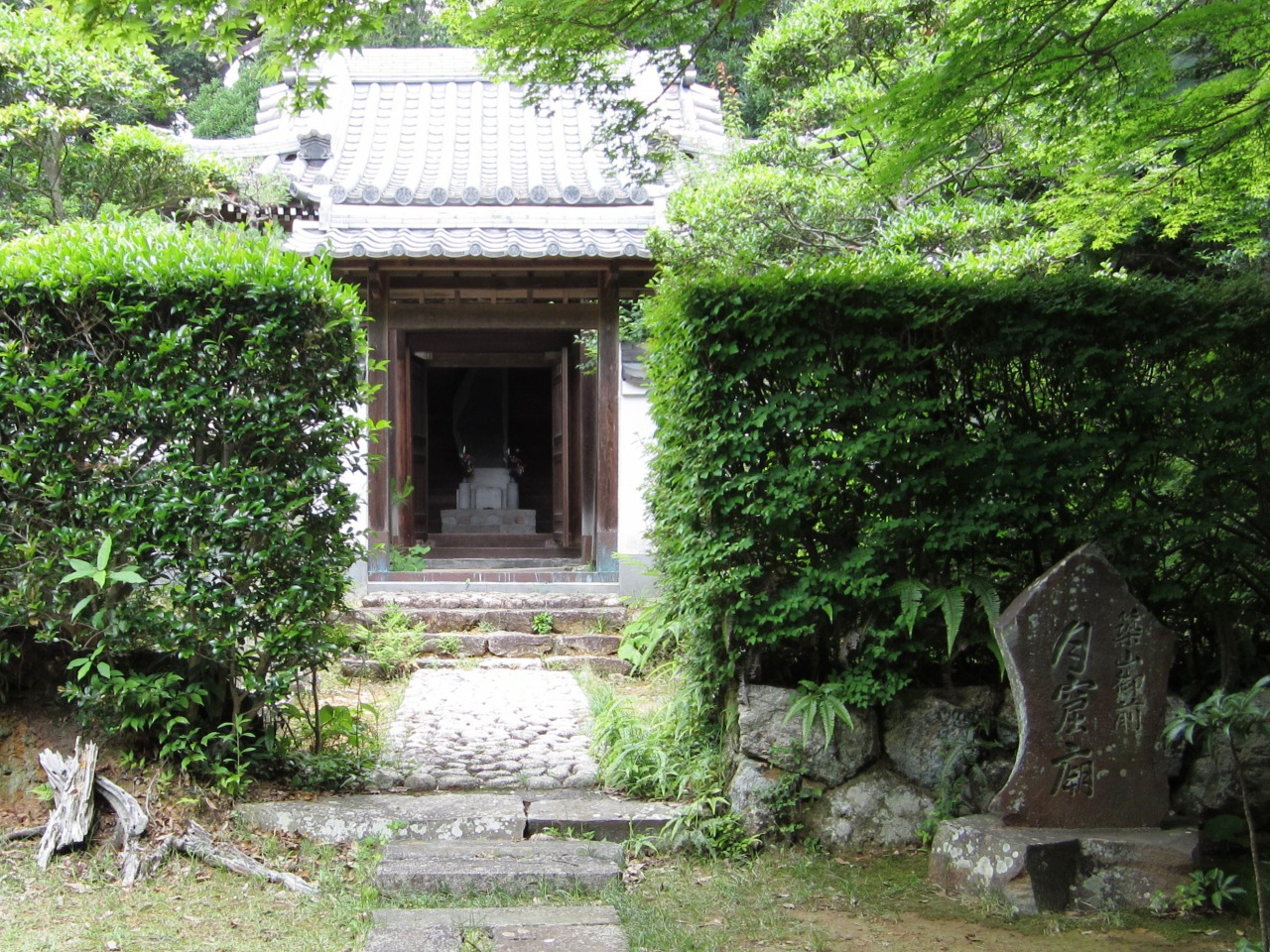
Gakkutsu-byō, Lady Tsukiyama's mausoleum at Seirai-in in Hamamatsu, Shizuoka.

Because Nobuyasu had no sons by his wife Tokuhime, a daughter of Oda Nobunaga, Lady Tsukiyama decided to procure a daughter of a Takeda retainer as her son's concubine. Seeing this and all of the conflicts that her mother-in-law made against her, Tokuhime sent a letter to her father, telling him that Lady Tsukiyama was conspiring with the Takeda clan against the Oda clan. Oda Nobunaga informed Ieyasu of this letter, and as a show of good faith and loyalty, and to preserve the Oda-Tokugawa alliance, Ieyasu ordered his wife executed, and Nobuyasu imprisoned due to his closeness with his mother.

On 19 September 1579, Lady Tsukiyama was stabbed to death and her head chopped off by three Tokugawa vassals namely Nonaka Shigemasa, Okamoto Heiemon, and Ishikawa Taroemon at Tomizuka in Totomi Province, near Hamamatsu. She was 38 years old. Her body was buried at Sairaiin Temple in Hamamatsu. Her primary grave is at Seiryū temple (清流寺) in Tenryu ward, Hamamatsu. Her head was sent to Okazaki and interred at Yūden temple (祐傳寺); during the Tenpō era (1830–1844) it was transferred to Yahashira Shrine (八柱神社).

Knowing his eldest son would feel obligated to avenge his late mother's death, Ieyasu eventually ordered Nobuyasu, who was confined at Futamata Castle (now Tenryū Ward, Hamamatsu), to commit suicide (seppuku) on 5 October 1579. His Buddhist name is Shoge-in.

== Theory about Tsukiyama's execution ==
The commonly believed theory regarding Tsukiyama's execution is that Nobunaga was the one who ordered the execution. However, modern era Japanese historian Kuroda Motoki challenged this theory by stating several facts, that it was Ieyasu himself who ordered the execution, based on contemporary evidence from Ieyasu's personal letter and the Azuchi Nikki (安土日記). On the other hand, Kuroda also stated that the story about Nobunaga as the one who ordered the execution solely based on Mikawa Monogatari (三河物語), an early Edo period source with a heavy Tokugawa slant. The execution was aimed to suppress the faction within the Tokugawa clan who preferred to ally with the Takeda clan and defied Oda Nobunaga. Such faction was spearheaded by Tsukiyama and her son Nobuyasu, which Ieyasu viewed as problematic as they have implied their collaboration with the Takeda even before the Battle of Nagashino. Other evidence supporting this theory is that Tsukiyama may have started the pro-Takeda faction as a means of revenge, since Nobunaga was responsible for the death of her uncle, Imagawa Yoshimoto.

Other historians and Sengoku period experts such as Watanabe Daimon, Taniguchi Katsuhiro, Honda Takanari, Hirayama Masaru and Shiba Hiroyuki also opined that her execution was Ieyasu's personal initiative. Only Kazuto Hongō among modern historian who still supported the classical theory which stated Nobunaga as the one who ordered Tsukiyama's execution.

== Popular culture ==
- Nanao portrayed her in the 2017 NHK Taiga drama Naotora: The Lady Warlord (おんな城主 直虎).
- Lady Tsukiyama appears as a playable character in the 2021 Koei Tecmo game Samurai Warriors 5.
- Kasumi Arimura portrays her (from youth to adulthood) in the 2023 NHK Taiga drama What Will You Do, Ieyasu?, opposite Jun Matsumoto as Takechiyo/Ieyasu.
