= Tatsumasa Murasame =

Japanese actor and gardener

- 村雨 辰剛
- Born: Jakob Sebastian Björk; July 25, 1988 (age 37); Sweden, Örkelljunga, Skåne County
- Occupations: Gardener, actor, television personality, model
- Agent: YMN
- Height: 182 cm (6 ft 0 in)

YouTube information
- Channel: 村雨辰剛の和暮らし
- Years active: July 14, 2020–present
- Subscribers: 107,000
- Last updated: July 18, 2025
- Website: Official profile

Tatsumasa Murasame (村雨 辰剛, Murasame Tatsumasa, born July 25, 1988) is a Japanese gardener, actor, television personality, and model. He was born in Örkelljunga, Skåne County, Sweden but moved to Japan in 2008 and became a naturalized citizen in 2015 at age 26. His birth name is Jakob Sebastian Björk (Swedish: Jakob Sebastian Björk). He is affiliated with the talent agency YMN.

== Early life ==
Murasame was born and raised in Sweden in 1988. His parents separated when he was young, and he was raised by his mother and stepfather, a pilot in the Swedish Air Force, in a rural town of about 8,000 people in southern Sweden.

During a world history class in junior high school, he became interested in Japanese culture and began studying Japanese on his own. His study method consisted of thoroughly memorizing vocabulary, and he always carried an English–Japanese dictionary. He also searched for Japanese people through Yahoo! Chat and began studying Japanese through online chat. At the age of 16, he stayed in Japan for three months on a homestay program. He developed the goal of "living in Japan as a Japanese person."

== Career ==
After graduating from high school, he moved to Japan and worked as an English and Swedish language instructor in Nagoya. There he was scouted by an agency for foreign talent and began working as a model and translator.

At age 23 he decided to pursue a career related to traditional Japanese culture and became an apprentice gardener in Nishio, Aichi Prefecture, where he trained for five years. At age 26 he acquired Japanese citizenship and changed his name to Tatsumasa Murasame.

From 2016 (age 27), he joined YMN and began activities as a television personality while continuing to work as a gardener. In 2017 he completed his gardening apprenticeship and moved to the Kantō region, where he worked for a large landscaping company in Tokyo before later becoming independent.

In 2018 he gained widespread attention after appearing on the NHK program Minna de Muscle Exercise. Around 2020 he became an independent gardener and launched a YouTube channel titled 村雨辰剛の和暮らし ("Tatsumasa Murasame’s Japanese Lifestyle"). In 2021 he became a navigator for the NHK Educational TV program Shumi no Engei. The same year he was cast as Robert Rosewood in the NHK morning drama Come Come Everybody, after which he began pursuing acting more seriously.

In 2019 and 2022 he published autobiographical essays describing his life.

He later became especially interested in the Sengoku period and Bushido.

He currently speaks three languages: Swedish, English, and Japanese.

== Naturalization ==
Murasame had considered becoming Japanese since he first moved to Japan at age 19.

After finding his calling as a gardener, he decided that he wanted to live and die in Japan. At age 26 in 2015 he renounced his Swedish citizenship and acquired Japanese citizenship.

His given name "Tatsumasa" was chosen by himself. "Tatsu" comes from his birth year in the Chinese zodiac (Year of the Dragon), and "Masa" was taken from a character in his master's name. The surname "Murasame" was suggested by his master's predecessor, inspired by the historical novelist Murasame Taijirō.

== Publications ==
- 僕は庭師になった (I Became a Gardener), Kraken, March 6, 2019. ISBN 978-4-909313-06-5
- 村雨辰剛と申します。 (My Name Is Tatsumasa Murasame), Shinchosha, June 1, 2022. ISBN 978-4-10-354621-4
