= Kanō Tenman-gū =

Shinto shrine in Gifu Prefecture, Japan

Kanō Tenmangu Shrine 加納天満宮
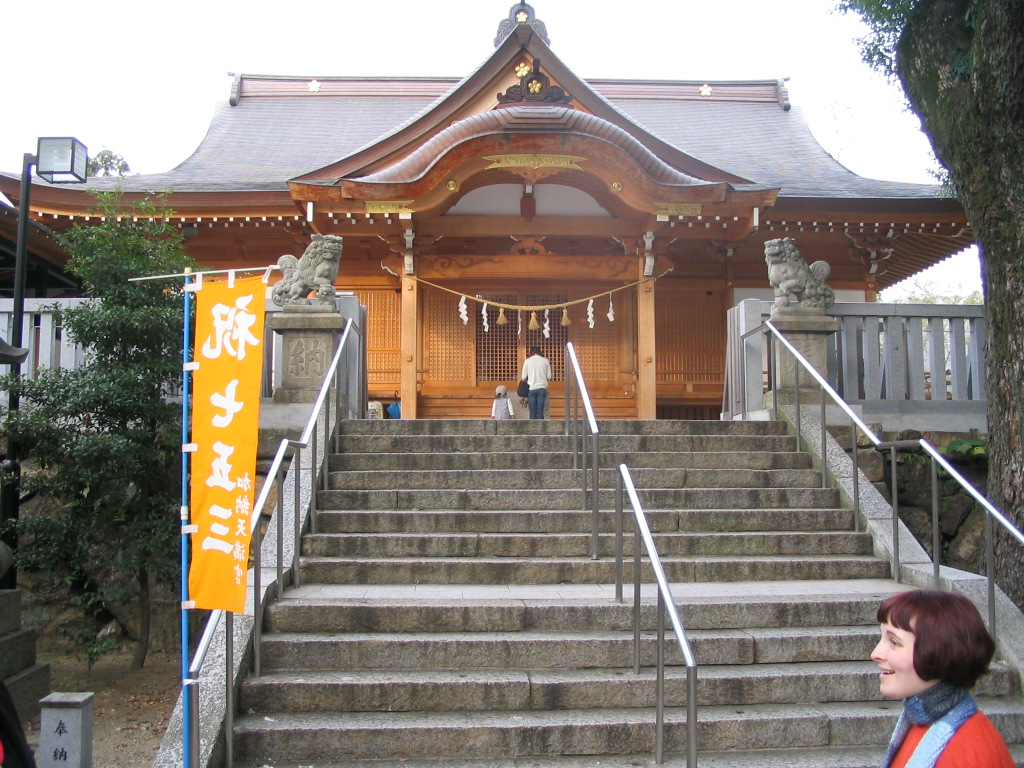
- Heiden, or offering hall, at Kanō Tenman-gū

- Location within Japan

Religion
- Affiliation: Shinto
- Deity: Tenjin
- Type: Tenman-gū

Location
- Location: 4-1 Kanō Tenjin-machi, Gifu; Gifu 〒500-8473
- Coordinates: 35°24′25.19″N 136°45′30.73″E

Architecture
- Established: 1445

Kanō Tenman-gū (加納天満宮) is a Shinto shrine located in the city of Gifu, Gifu Prefecture, Japan. It was built as the shrine to protect Izumii Castle (predecessor to Kanō Castle). As a Tenman-gū, it is dedicated to Tenjin, the deified form of Sugawara no Michizane. Additionally, Matsudaira Mitsushige, who first created Gifu Umbrellas, is also canonized on the shrine grounds. The shrine's festival is held on the third Saturday and Sunday of October each year.

== History ==
In 1445, Saitō Toshinaga constructed Izumii Castle (泉井城 Izumii-jō) and, at the same time, commissioned the construction of the Tenman-gū for the god that would protect the castle. (Other records indicate that the shrine was first constructed in 1350.) Even after Izumii Castle was abandoned in 1538, people were still being enshrined in the Tenman-gū after their deaths.

Okudaira Nobumasa built Kanō Castle in 1601 and moved the shrine to its current location and named it Kanō Tenman-gū.

In 1810, nearly four centuries after its construction, the shrine's haiden (拝殿 prayer hall) was rebuilt. This structure, however, was damaged on October 28, 1891 when the Mino–Owari earthquake struck the area. The shrine was again damaged in 1945, during the firebombing of Gifu during World War II. Most of the shrines buildings were lost to fire, but the haiden remained.

An early reconstruction of the honden, or main shine, took place in 1948, but it was again rebuilt in 2003. At the same time, the float carrying tradition that was stopped after World War II was brought back as part of the Kanō Tenman-gū Festival.
