= Torii Suneemon =

Japanese soldier (c. 1540–1575)

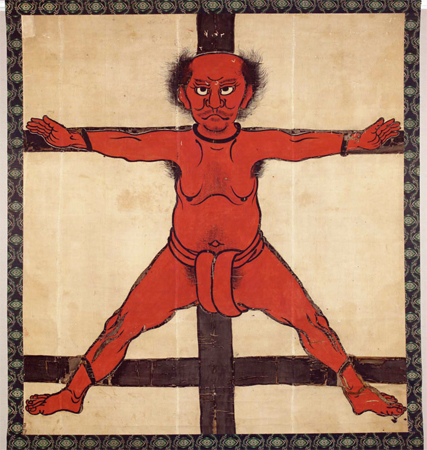
Banner made by Ochiai Michihisa, 16th century

Torii Suneemon (鳥居 強右衛門; c. 1540 – May 16, 1575) was an ashigaru (lowly foot soldier) who served the Okudaira family, retainer of Tokugawa Ieyasu. He became famous for his bravery and incredible exploit at the siege of Nagashino.

He was a retainer of Okudaira Sadamasa and member of the Nagashino garrison when the fortress was put under siege by the forces of Takeda Katsuyori. Kamehime, the wife of Sadamasa, assisted him in the defense. Torii, already renowned for his bravery and knowledge of the surroundings, volunteered for the extremely dangerous mission of sneaking through the siege lines to request aid from Tokugawa Ieyasu in Okazaki. However, after successfully warning Tokugawa, he was captured by the Takeda on his return to Nagashino.

Torii was directed to shout to his compatriots in the fortress that no help was on the way, and that they should surrender. He instead encouraged the garrison that Tokugawa's army was, in fact, on the way, and that they should keep fighting. There is some dispute as to whether Torii was crucified before or after this proclamation, as well as the precise details of his execution.

Although Sune'emon was an ashigaru warrior, his family was promoted to the samurai class and served the Okudaira family until the end of the Edo period. One Takeda retainer, Ochiai Michihisa, was so moved by his bravery that he used an image of the crucified Torii Suneemon on his flag from then on. The flag is now stored in the University of Tokyo library.

In 1923, a railway station opened near Torii's death place and was named Torii Station.
