= Matsudaira Nobuyasu =

Japanese noble

Matsudaira Nobuyasu 松平信康
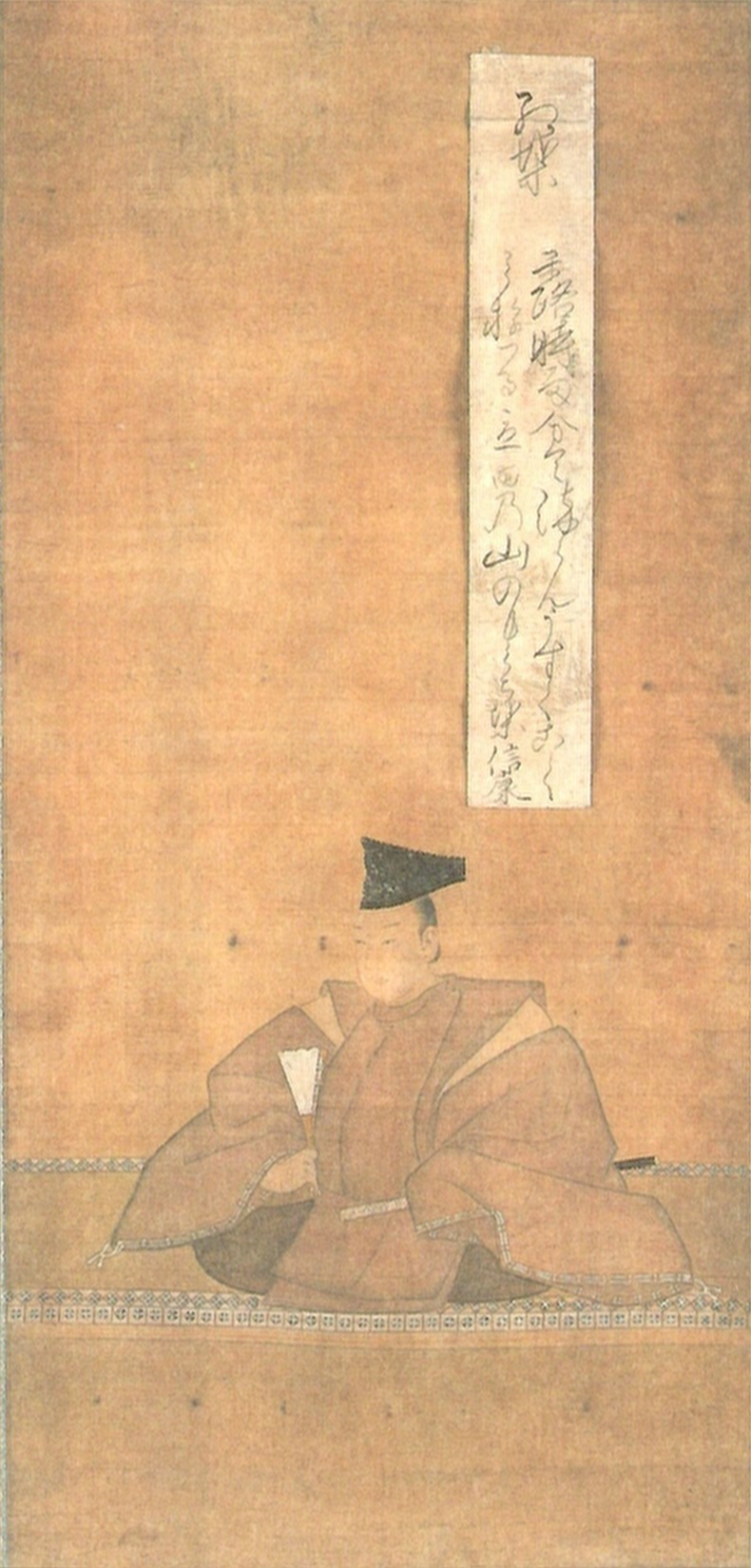
- Born: Takechiyo (竹千代); April 13, 1559
- Died: October 5, 1579 (aged 20)
- Other names: Jirōzaburō (次郎三郎); Okazaki Saburō (岡崎三郎)
- Spouse: Tokuhime
- Partner: Concubine (Hinata Toraaki's daughter)
- Children: Toku-hime; Kumahime
- Parents: Tokugawa Ieyasu (father); Lady Tsukiyama (mother)
- Family: Tokugawa clan

Matsudaira Nobuyasu (松平 信康; 13 April 1559 – 5 October 1579) was the eldest son of Matsudaira Ieyasu. His tsūshō ("common name") was Jirōzaburō (次郎三郎). He was also called "Okazaki Saburō" (岡崎 三郎), because he had become the lord of Okazaki Castle (岡崎城) in 1570. Because he was a son of Tokugawa Ieyasu, he is often referred to, retroactively, as Tokugawa Nobuyasu (徳川 信康).

== Biography ==
Nobuyasu was Ieyasu's first son. His mother was Lady Tsukiyama, daughter of Imagawa Yoshimoto. His full blood sister was Kamehime. His childhood name was Takechiyo (竹千代).

As a child, Nobuyasu was sent to the Imagawa capital of Sunpu, located in Suruga Province (modern-day Shizuoka Prefecture) as a hostage. Later, he was named keeper of Okazaki Castle in Mikawa Province (modern-day Aichi Prefecture), the birthplace of his father, and took part in the Battle of Nagashino in 1575.

It is generally believed that Nobuyasu's mother and his wife, the Lady Tokuhime, daughter of Oda Nobunaga, did not get along. It's possible that Lady Tsukiyama was jealous of the attention her son paid to his young wife. In 1579, whether out of a desire for revenge or to remove her mother-in-law's meddling in their marriage, Tokuhime wrote a letter to her father Oda Nobunaga, accusing her mother-in-law of a treasonous plot with the Takeda clan. When Nobunaga brought the allegations to the attention of Ieyasu, he had his wife confined and then executed, to allay any suspicions of his ally. Nobuyasu was confined to Ohama and then Futamata Castle, where he received his father's order to commit suicide (seppuku), in a letter which stated that Ieyasu understood that Nobuyasu may not have been guilty of any treasonous act, or even knew anything about it, but he understood that Nobuyasu would feel obligated to avenge his late mother. The possibility of revenge was an unacceptable risk to Ieyasu, and the only solution was that Nobuyasu should kill himself for the integrity and security of the clan. Nobuyasu committed seppuku on 5 October 1579.

Nobuyasu is not believed to have been a popular figure in his time, as his demise might attest. In particular, supposedly Sakai Tadatsugu declined to refute any suspicions of treason, due to his personal disregard for Nobuyasu.

=== Legend ===
According to legend, he thought that if he encountered a monk, he would not be able to catch much prey, so he killed the monk. It is said that he killed the people of his territory simply because they were bad at Bon dance. These legends are thought to have been created in later generations, and are thought to have been created for the purpose of justifying seppuku.

== Issue ==
- Tokuhime (1576-1607), who married Ogasawara Hidemasa of Matsumoto Domain
- Kumahime (1577-1626), who married Honda Tadamasa
- Banchiyo, who was the son of a concubine
