= Nagai Naokoto =

- 永井尚服
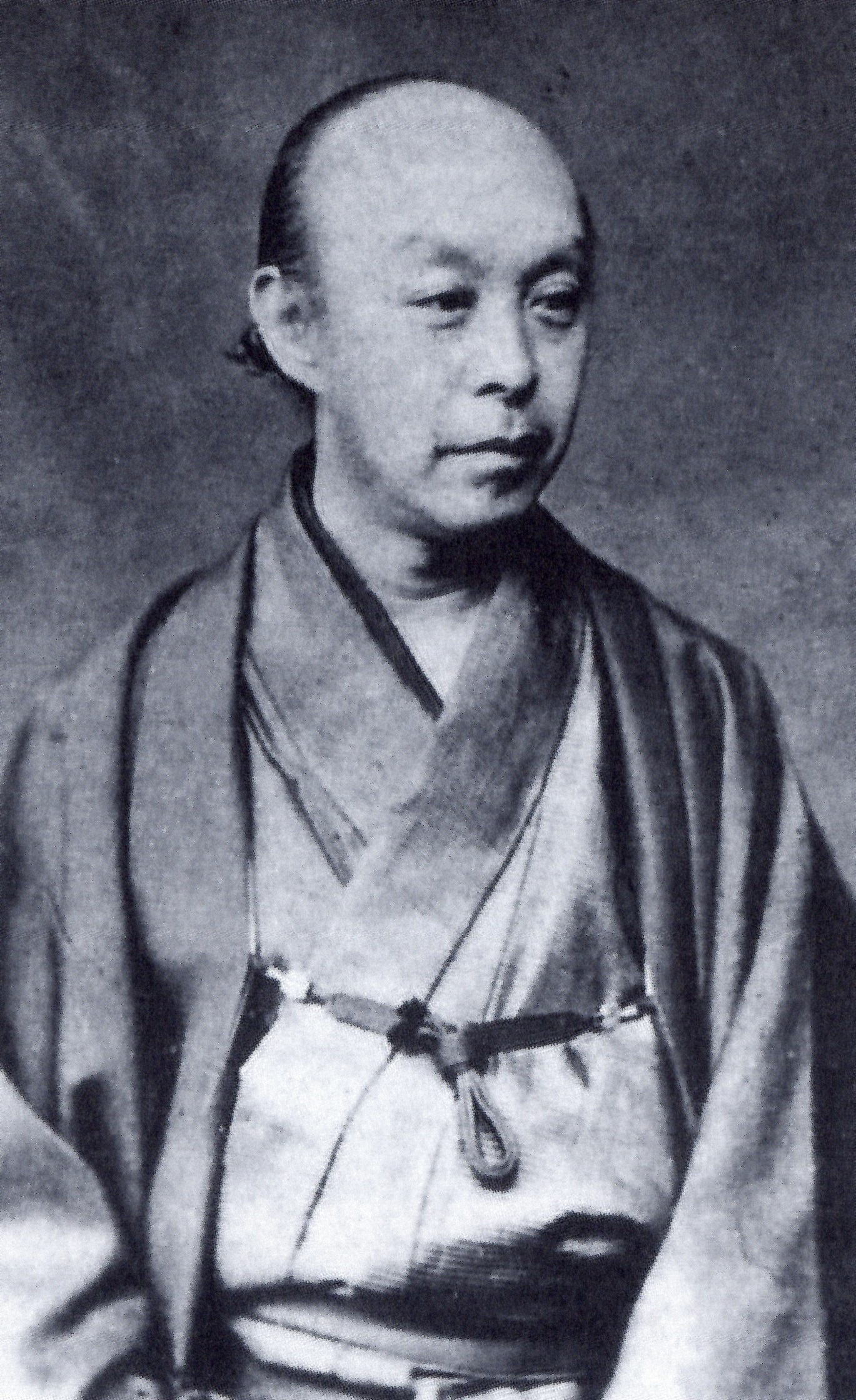
- Nagai Naokoto, pre-1871

6th Daimyō of Kanō Domain
- In office 1862–1869
- Monarchs: Shōgun: Tokugawa Iemochi; Tokugawa Yoshinobu
- Preceded by: Nagai Naonori
- Succeeded by: -- none--

Imperial Governor of Kanō
- In office 1869–1870
- Monarch: Emperor Meiji

Personal details
- Born: January 16, 1834
- Died: June 11, 1885 (aged 51) Tokyo, Japan
- Parent: Itakura Katsutoshi (father)

Viscount Nagai Naokoto (永井尚服; January 16, 1834 – June 11, 1885) was the 6th and final daimyō of Kanō Domain under the Bakumatsu period Tokugawa Shogunate of Japan.

== Biography ==
Nagai Naokoto was the 7th son of Itakura Katsutoshi, the daimyō of Fukushima Domain. In 1852 he was adopted as heir to Nagai Naonori, the 5th daimyō of Kanō Domain and married Naonori's third daughter, Kyoko. He was granted Lower Fifth court rank and the courtesy title of Izu-no-kami in 1860. His courtesy title would later be changed to Hizen-no-kami. In 1862, he became daimyō on the retirement of his adoptive father. He was appointed bugyō of the Kōbusho, the shogun's military academy in 1865, and Jisha-bugyō and sōshaban in 1866. In 1867, he rose to the position of wakadoshiyori and Kaikei bugyō

At the time of the Battle of Toba-Fushimi in 1868 he continued to support the former Shogunate; however, the karō of the domain approached the fledgling Meiji government and suggested that Nagai Naonori be brought back from retirement to lead the domain. A few days later, Nagai Naokoto resigned from his post as wakadoshiyori and returned to Kanō from Edo. He submitted to the new government, and was ordered to use his soldiers as part of the vanguard for the advance of the imperial army eastwards along the Tōsandō towards Edo. Due to his position as a former wakadoshiyori, he was not trusted by the Satchō Alliance leaders, although several allegations that he continued to collaborate with pro-Tokugawa forces were never supported by any evidence. In 1869, the position of daimyō was abolished, and he became imperial governor of Kanō. With the abolition of the han system in 1871, he relocated to Tokyo.

With the establishment of kazoku peerage on July 8, 1884, he was made a viscount (shishaku). Nagai Naokoto died in 1855 at the age of 53. His grave is at the temple of Hongyo-ji in Nishinippori, Arakawa, Tokyo.
