= Honda Masazumi =

Daimyo in the early Edo period

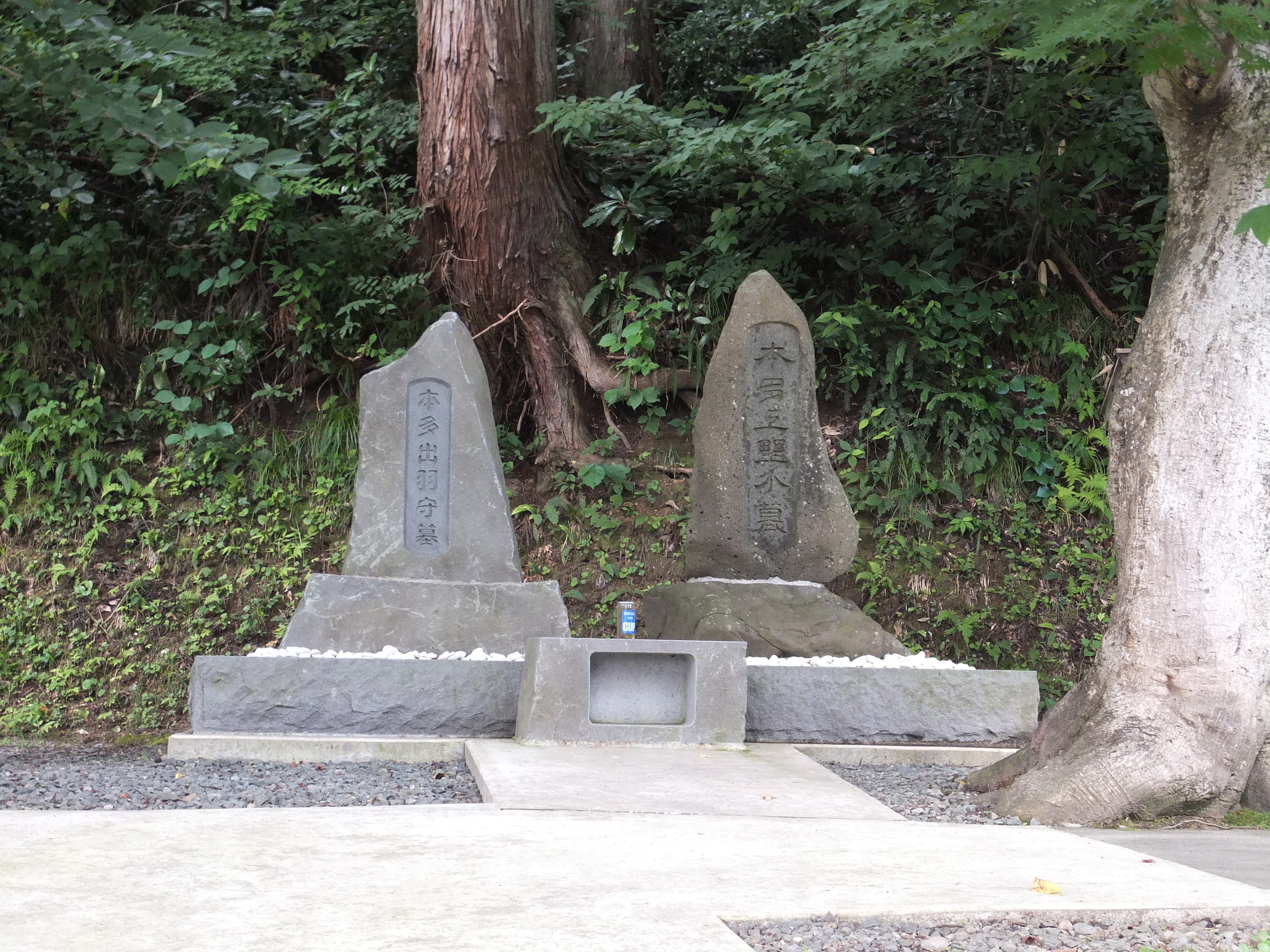
Graves of Honda Masazumi and Honda Masakatsu

Honda Masazumi (本多 正純) (1566 – April 5, 1637) was a Japanese samurai of the Azuchi–Momoyama period through early Edo period, who served the Tokugawa clan. He later became a daimyō, and one of the first rōjū of the Tokugawa shogunate.

Masazumi was born in 1565; he was the eldest son of Honda Masanobu. Father and son served Tokugawa Ieyasu together. Masazumi was in the main force at Sekigahara; after the battle, Masazumi was entrusted with the guardianship of the defeated Ishida Mitsunari. Masazumi was made a daimyo in 1608, with an income of 33,000 koku.

Ieyasu trusted Honda sufficiently to have relied on him as an intermediary for diplomatic initiatives with China.

In 1612 February, the Okamoto Daihachi incident occurred, when a vassal of Masazumi named Okamoto Daihachi received a large bribe from daimyo Arima Harunobu. However, this turned out to be a fraud, and Daihachi was burned at the stake, while Harunobu executed. As both Hatunobu and Daihachi were Catholics , this marked the beginning of the Tokugawa shogunate's full-scale policy of Catholic persecution.

Later, Masazumi served at the siege of Osaka; in 1616, he became a toshiyori; this was the position that would soon after be renamed as rōjū. In this role, he worked closely with the now-retired second shōgun, Hidetada. During this period, his income was increased to 53,000 koku,

In October 1619, after Fukushima Masanori was stripped from his domain, Masazumi was granted an increase in his stipend from 53,000 koku in the Oyama Domain in Shimotsuke Province to 155,000 koku in the Utsunomiya Domain, according to the will of the late Ieyasu. This further aroused resentment from those around him . However, Masazumi himself refused the increase, citing it as being excessive for someone who had not achieved any significant military feats, and also taking into consideration the resentment and anger of his political enemies.

== Utsunomiya Castle incident ==
In 1622, The Utsunomiya Castle Suspended-ceiling Incident occurred, which became the downfall of Masazumi's career. Before the incident, Tokugawa Hidetada was planning to stay overnight at Utsunomiya Castle after visiting Nikkō Tōshō-gū shrine to commemorate the seventh anniversary of Ieyasu's death, so Masazumi had the castle under construction and the Onari Palace built.

Honda Masazumi, eager to impress the Shogun with a grand reception, lavishly repaired and redecorated Utsunomiya Castle, mobilizing all his retainers. Among them were about a hundred low-ranking Negoro foot soldiers from Kii Province. When ordered to help with the castle's interior work, they refused, claiming they were assigned only as combat troops. Enraged, Masazumi had them all executed. His predecessor, Okudaira Tadamasa, had been transferred to Kōka Castle in Shimōsa. Kamehime, Okudaira's mother—proud sister of Shogun Hidetada—ignored Shogunate rules and ordered retainers to strip Utsunomiya bare, taking fences, gates, sliding doors, bamboo, and garden plants. Citing the regulation forbidding removal of trees or bamboo upon transfer, Masazumi set up a border checkpoint and confiscated everything illegal. Furious, the Kamehime held grudge towards Masazumi and waited for revenge. Furthermore, Kamehime also resented Masazumi's father, Honda Masanobu, as she blamed him for the fall of Okubo Tadachika, the father-in-law of Kamehime's daughter, During the Okubo clan's affair around 1613–1614.

As now she saw the chance for revenge against Masazumi, Kamehime now warned Hidetada that Masazumi was plotting rebellion and had massacred a hundred Negoro men to hide the castle's secret defenses; the Shogun should not enter. Kamehime also further accused Masazumi by telling Hidetada that Masazumi planned to assassinate the Shogun by installing a brittle dropped ceiling in Utsunomiya Castle, designed to fall and crash when Hidetada passed, thus crushing and killing him in the process. Hidetada, who believed his sister's words, immediately cancelled his visit to the castle. and went straight to Edo After that, a shogunate magistrate Itami Yasukatsu and his allies examined the incident and charged Masazumi with 11 crimes, including the secret manufacture of guns, unauthorized repairs to the stone walls of Utsunomiya Castle, and the said dropped ceiling case which alleged as assassinations plan, which Became the alleged instrument of the plot to assassinate Hidetada. Masazumi answered the first 11 questions clearly, but was unable to provide an adequate defense for the three additional questions. These were the execution of a Negoro police officer who had disobeyed orders during the castle repairs, the unauthorized purchase of guns, and the construction of a loophole during the repairs of Utsunomiya Castle.

Following the examination, Hidetada stripped Masazumi of his 150,000-koku worth domain, sent him to Yamagata in Dewa, and soon reduced him to a mere 1,000-koku exile.

Masazumi died in Yokote in 1637 at age 73.

== Notes ==
Japanese royalty
Preceded by none	1st Daimyō of Oyama (Honda); 1608–1619	Succeeded by none
Preceded by Okudaira Tadamasa	1st Daimyō of Utsunomiya (Honda); 1619–1622	Succeeded by Okudaira Tadamasa
