= Ochiai Michihisa =

Ochiai Michihisa (落合 道久) was a samurai retainer to the Takeda clan during Japan's Sengoku period. Fighting for the Takeda at the battle of Nagashino, he was moved by the bravery of Torii Suneemon, a common foot-soldier of the opposing forces who risked his life, escaping from the besieged castle to seek reinforcements from Tokugawa Ieyasu, only to be captured and crucified by the Takeda; from then on, Ochiai used an image of Torii Suneemon on the cross as his standard.
