= Kanō Domain =

Kanō Domain 加納藩
- Domain of Japan
- 1601–1871
- Capital: Kanō Castle
  - Type: Daimyō
- Historical era: Edo period
  - Established: 1601
  - Disestablished: 1871
- Today part of: Gifu Prefecture

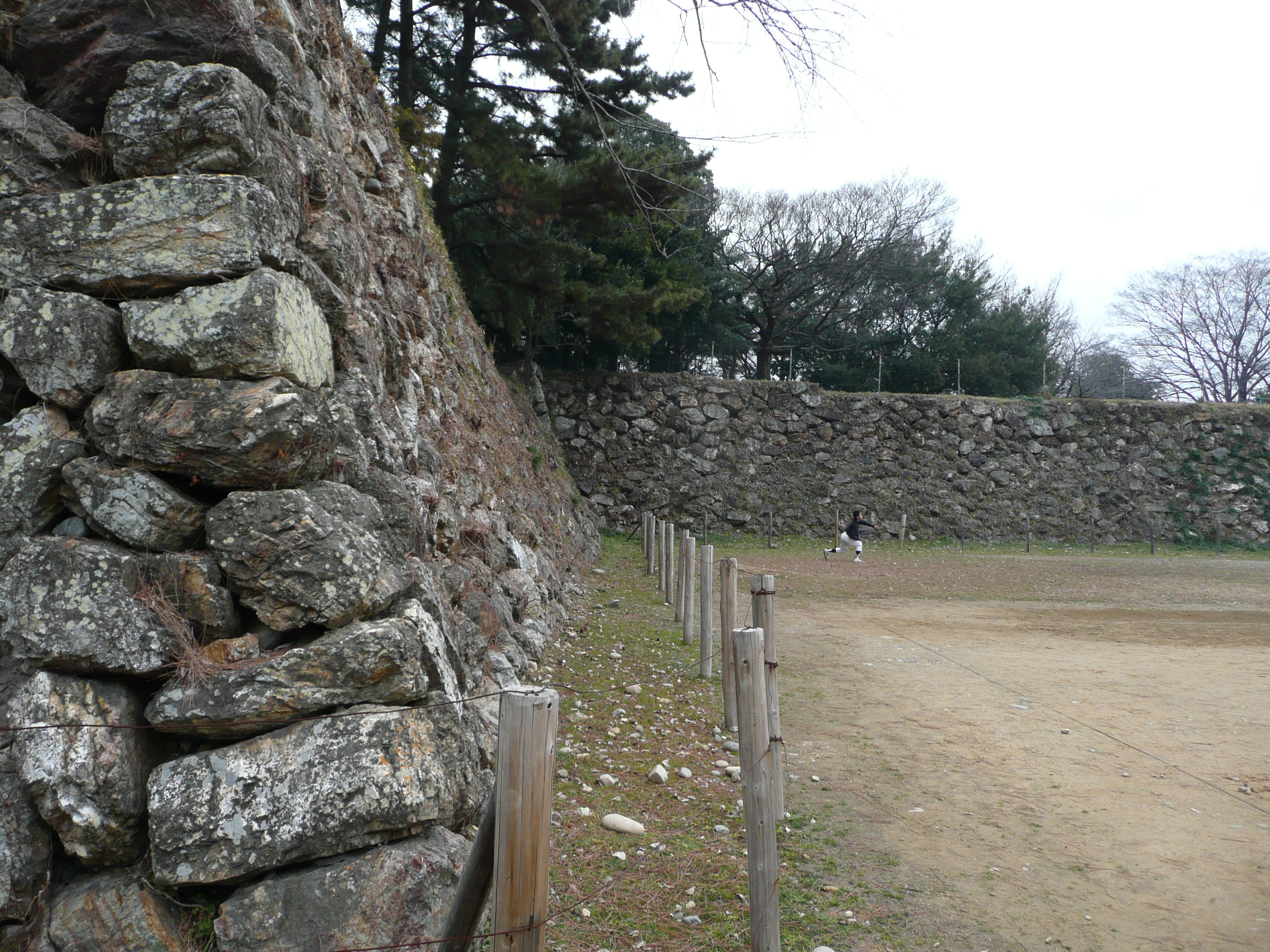
Remnants of the walls of Kanō Castle

Kanō Domain (加納藩, Kanō-han) was a fudai feudal domain of Edo period Japan. The domain was centered at Kanō Castle, located in what is now part of the city of Gifu in Gifu Prefecture.

== History ==
Before the Battle of Sekigahara, the central Mino Province was ruled by Oda Hidenobu, Oda Nobunaga's grandson, from his base at Gifu Castle. However, as Hidenobu sided with Ishida Mitsunari at the Battle of Sekigahara, his territory was confiscated by Tokugawa Ieyasu. In 1601, Ieyasu granted the area to his son-in-law Okudaira Nobumasa. Okudaira Nobumasa was allowed to build Kanō Castle with materials from the dismantled Gifu Castle. This was the birth of the Kanō Domain.

Nobumasa's placement at Kanō was meant to act as a check against the potentially hostile lords of western Japan, who might have wanted to march eastward against Ieyasu. Nobumasa retired in 1602, handing over the position of daimyō to his son Okudaira Tadamasa; however, he retained 40,000 of the domain's 100,000 koku as a "retirement fund", and continued to hold actual power, establishing a system of flood control and aiding in the setup of the castletown. Nobumasa and Tadamasa died in quick succession; the third Okudaira lord of Kanō, Tadataka, died heirless in 1632, and so Okudaira rule in Kanō came to an end.

Kanō was then given to the Ōkubo clan, with a reduced kokudaka of 50,000 koku from 1632 to 1639. Ōkubo Tadamoto was transferred from Kisai Domain in Musashi Province (which was dissolved as a result) and subsequently swapped places with the Matsudaira-Toda clan of Akashi Domain in Harima Province.

Under the Toda (1639-1711), the domain had a rated kokudaka of 70,000 koku. The Toda ruled until their transfer to Yodo Domain in Yamashiro Province in 1711. They were followed by the Andō clan from Bitchu-Matsuyama Domain (1711-1756), initially at 65,000 koku, but later reduced to 50,000 koku due to misrule before they were transferred to Iwakitaira Domain in Mutsu Province.

The Nagai clan, from Iwatsuki Domain in Musashi Province, ruled from 1756 until the Meiji restoration, with a kokudaka reduced to 32,000 koku. The 4th Nagai daimyō, Nagai Naosuke, served the Tokugawa shogunate as a wakadoshiyori, as did the final daimyō, Nagai Naokoto. During the Boshin War, the domain organized a surrender to Iwakura Tomomi without a fight.

After the Meiji restoration, Nagai Naokoto served as Domain governor until the abolition of the han system in 1871, and later received the kazoku peerage title of viscount.

== Bakumatsu period holdings ==
As with most domains in the han system, Kanō Domain consisted of a discontinuous territories calculated to provide the assigned kokudaka, based on periodic cadastral surveys and projected agricultural yields.

- Mino Province
- 21 villages in Atsumi District
- Kawachi Province
  - 5 villages in Matta District
  - 1 village in [[Katano District, Osaka{Katano District]]
- Settsu Province
  - 5 villages in Shimashimo District
  - 8 villages in Shimakami District

== List of daimyō ==
	Name	Tenure	Courtesy title	Court Rank	kokudaka
Okudaira clan (fudai) 1601-1632
1	Okudaira Nobumasa (奥平信昌)	1601–1602	Mimasaka-no-kami (美作守)	Junior 5th Rank, Lower Grade (従五位下)	100,000 koku
2	Okudaira Tadamasa (奥平忠政)	1602–1614	Settsu-no-kami (摂津守); Jijū (侍従)	Junior 4th Rank, Lower Grade (従四位下)	100,000 koku
3	Okudaira Tadataka (奥平忠隆)	1614–1632	Hida-no-kami (飛騨守)	Junior 5th Rank, Lower Grade (従五位下)	100,000 koku
Ōkubo clan (fudai) 1632-1639
1	Ōkubo Tadamoto (大久保忠職)	1632–1639	Kaga-no-kami (加賀守)	Junior 5th Rank, Lower Grade (従五位下)	50,000 koku
Matsudaira-Toda clan (fudai) 1639-1711
1	Matsudaira Mitsushige (Toda) (松平光重)	1639–1668	Tanba-no-kami (丹波守)	Junior 5th Rank, Lower Grade (従五位下)	70,000 koku
2	Matsudaira Mitsunaga (Toda) (松平光永)	1668–1705	Tanba-no-kami (丹波守)	Junior 4th Rank, Lower Grade (従四位下)	70,000 koku
3	Matsudaira Tadahiro (Toda) ([松平光煕)	1705–1711	Kawachi-no-kami (河内守)	Junior 5th Rank, Lower Grade (従五位下)	70,000 koku
Andō clan (fudai) 1711-1756
1	Andō Nobutomo (安藤信友)	1711–1732	Tsushima-no-kami (対馬守)	Junior 4th Rank, Lower Grade (従四位下)	65,000 koku
2	Andō Nobutada (安藤信尹))	1732–1755	Tsushima-no-kami (対馬守)	Junior 5th Rank, Lower Grade (従五位下)	65,000 koku
3	Andō Nobunari (安藤信成)	1755–1756	Tsushima-no-kami (対馬守), Jijū (侍従)	Junior 4th Rank, Lower Grade (従四位下)	65,000 ->50,000 koku
Nagai clan (fudai) 1756-1871
1	Nagai Naonobu (永井直陳)	1756–1762	Iga-no-kami (伊賀守)	Junior 5th Rank, Lower Grade (従五位下)	32,000 koku
2	Nagai Naomitsu (永井尚備)	1762–1769	Iga-no-kami (伊賀守)	Junior 5th Rank, Lower Grade (従五位下)	32,000 koku
3	Nagai Naohisa (永井直旧)	1769–1790	Iga-no-kami (伊賀守)	Junior 5th Rank, Lower Grade (従五位下)	32,000 koku
4	Nagai Naosuke (永井尚佐)	1790–1839	Hizen-no-kami (肥前守)	Junior 5th Rank, Lower Grade (従五位下)	32,000 koku
5	Nagai Naonori (永井尚典)	1839–1862	Hizen-no-kami (肥前守)	Junior 5th Rank, Lower Grade (従五位下)	32,000 koku
6	Nagai Naokoto (永井尚服)	1862–1871	Iga-no-kami (伊賀守)	Junior 5th Rank, Lower Grade (従五位下)	32,000 koku
