= YMN =

YMN or ymn may refer to:

- YMN, the IATA code for Makkovik Airport, Newfoundland and Labrador, Canada
- YMN, the station code for Yarraman railway station, Victoria, Australia
- ymn, the ISO 639-3 code for Yamna language, Indonesia
- A US Navy hull classification symbol: Dredge, non-self propelled (YMN)
