= Okudaira Tadamasa =

Japanese daimyō

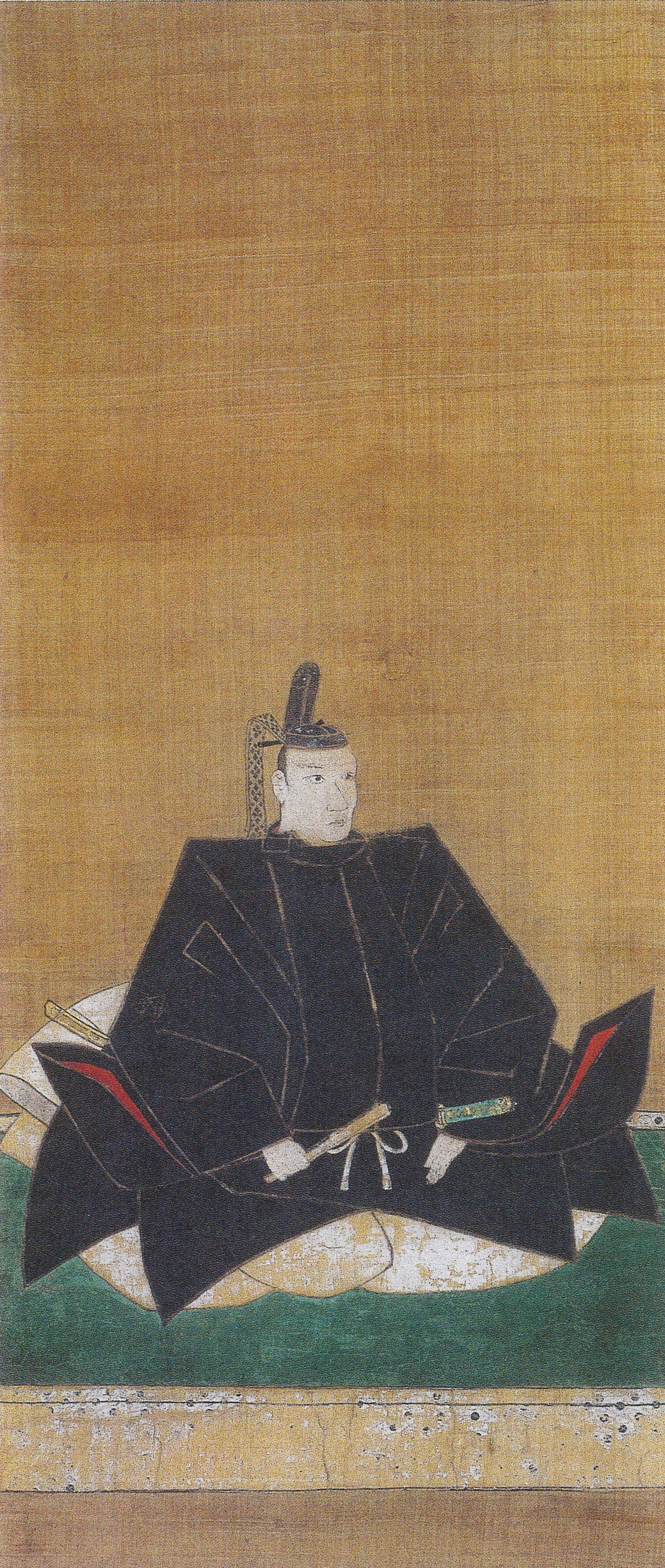
Okudaira Tadamasa(加納藩主)

Okudaira Tadamasa (奥平 忠政, 1580 – August 7, 1614) was a Japanese daimyō of the early Edo period. He was the son of Tokugawa Ieyasu's daughter Kamehime with her husband, Okudaira Nobumasa. Due to this family connection, he was allowed to use the Matsudaira surname. He was briefly adopted by Suganuma Sadamitsu; however, this adoption lasted for only five years. Upon Nobumasa's death, Tadamasa succeeded him as lord of the Kanō Domain.

Preceded by Sasanuma Sadatoshi	Daimyō of Yoshii; 1602	Succeeded by Hotta Masayasu
Preceded by Okudaira Nobumasa	2nd (Okudaira) Daimyō of Kanō; 1602–1614	Succeeded by Okudaira Tadataka
