= Tokuhime (Oda) =

Japanese noble lady

Tokuhime 徳姫
- Born: November 11, 1559
- Died: February 16, 1636 (aged 76)
- Other names: Gotokuhime (五徳姫); Lady Toku; Okazaki-dono
- Spouse: Matsudaira Nobuyasu
- Children: Toku-hime; Kumahime
- Parents: Oda Nobunaga (father); Kitsuno (mother)
- Family: Oda clan Tokugawa clan

Tokuhime (徳姫; November 11, 1559 – February 16, 1636), also known as Lady Toku (五徳姫, Gotokuhime) and Okazaki-dono (岡崎殿, Lady Okazaki) was a Japanese noble lady from the Sengoku period. She was the eldest daughter of daimyō Oda Nobunaga and his concubine, Lady Kitsuno. She later married Matsudaira Nobuyasu, the first son of Tokugawa Ieyasu. She is remembered as the person most responsible for the deaths of Nobuyasu and his mother, Ieyasu's wife, Lady Tsukiyama.

== Biography ==
Tokuhime was engaged to Tokugawa Ieyasu's five-year-old son Nobuyasu in early 1563, when she herself was only three and a half years old. Her marriage was politically motivated and was used to seal an alliance between Tokugawa Ieyasu and Oda Nobunaga.

On July 3, 1567, the then-eight-year-old Tokuhime officially married the then-nine-year-old Nobuyasu in Mikawa Province. In 1570, once the 11-year-old Nobuyasu became the lord of Okazaki Castle, Tokuhime became known as Okazaki-dono.

As the years went by, Nobuyasu and Tokuhime became quite attached to each other, however, Tokuhime's mother-in-law, Lady Tsukiyama, made life quite difficult for her and interfered in matters between her and her husband. Lady Tsukiyama was known as a jealous and contrary woman, and even her husband Ieyasu found it difficult to share the same residence as her. Because Tokuhime only gave birth to two daughters in 1576 and 1577, Lady Tsukiyama took a daughter from a couple of former Takeda's retainers to be Nobuyasu's concubines, and this action bothered Tokuhime.

As a young woman, Tokuhime decided to retaliate against Lady Tsukiyama. When Tokuhime was about nineteen, she had had enough of her mother-in-law's interference and wrote a letter to her father, Oda Nobunaga, conveying her suspicion that Lady Tsukiyama had been in secret correspondence with Takeda Katsuyori, one of Nobunaga's worst enemies. Nobunaga relayed this suspicion of betrayal to his ally, Ieyasu, who promptly had his wife imprisoned. As Ieyasu needed to maintain his alliance with Nobunaga, the accusations were taken quite seriously, and as Lady Tsukiyama and her son were quite close, Ieyasu therefore had Nobuyasu put into custody. No solid evidence of treachery ever surfaced, but to assuage his ally, Ieyasu had his wife executed on September 19, 1579. Ieyasu did not believe his son would betray him, but to prevent him from seeking vengeance for the death of his mother, he ordered Nobuyasu to commit suicide by seppuku where he was held at Futamata Castle on October 5 the following month. Although Tokuhime wanted only to anonymously retaliate against Lady Tsukiyama, the situation snowballed, and by the end of 1579, her husband and her mother-in-law were killed and she was a widow.

In 1580, Ieyasu visited Okazaki Castle and met up with Tokuhime on March 2. Three days later, on March 5, Tokuhime departed to return home, escorted by Matsudaira Ietada half of the trip. Her two daughters she had with Nobuyasu were left behind with their grandfather.

== Family ==
- Father: Oda Nobunaga (1536–1582)
- Brothers:
  - Oda Nobutada (1557–1582)
  - Oda Nobukatsu (1558–1630)
  - Oda Nobutaka (1558–1583)
  - Hashiba Hidekatsu (1567–1585)
  - Oda Katsunaga (1568–1582)
  - Oda Nobuhide (1571–1597)
  - Oda Nobutaka (1576–1602)
  - Oda Nobuyoshi (1573–1615)
  - Oda Nobusada (1574–1624)
  - Oda Nobuyoshi (died 1609)
  - Oda Nagatsugu (died 1600)
  - Oda Nobumasa (1554–1647)
- Sisters:
  - Fuyuhime (1561–1641), wife of Gamō Ujisato
  - Hideko (died 1632)
  - Eihime (1574–1623)
  - Hōonin
  - Sannomaru-dono (d. 1603), one of Toyotomi Hideyoshi's concubines.
  - Tsuruhime
- Husband: Matsudaira Nobuyasu (1559–1579)
- children:
  - Tokuhime (1576-1607), married Ogasawara Hidemasa
  - Kumahime (1577-1626), married Honda Tadamasa
