= Nagashino Castle =

Feudal-era castle in Shinshiro, Aichi Prefecture, Japan

Coordinates: 34°55′22.14″N 137°33′35.45″E

- 長篠城
- Shinshiro, Aichi Prefecture, Japan
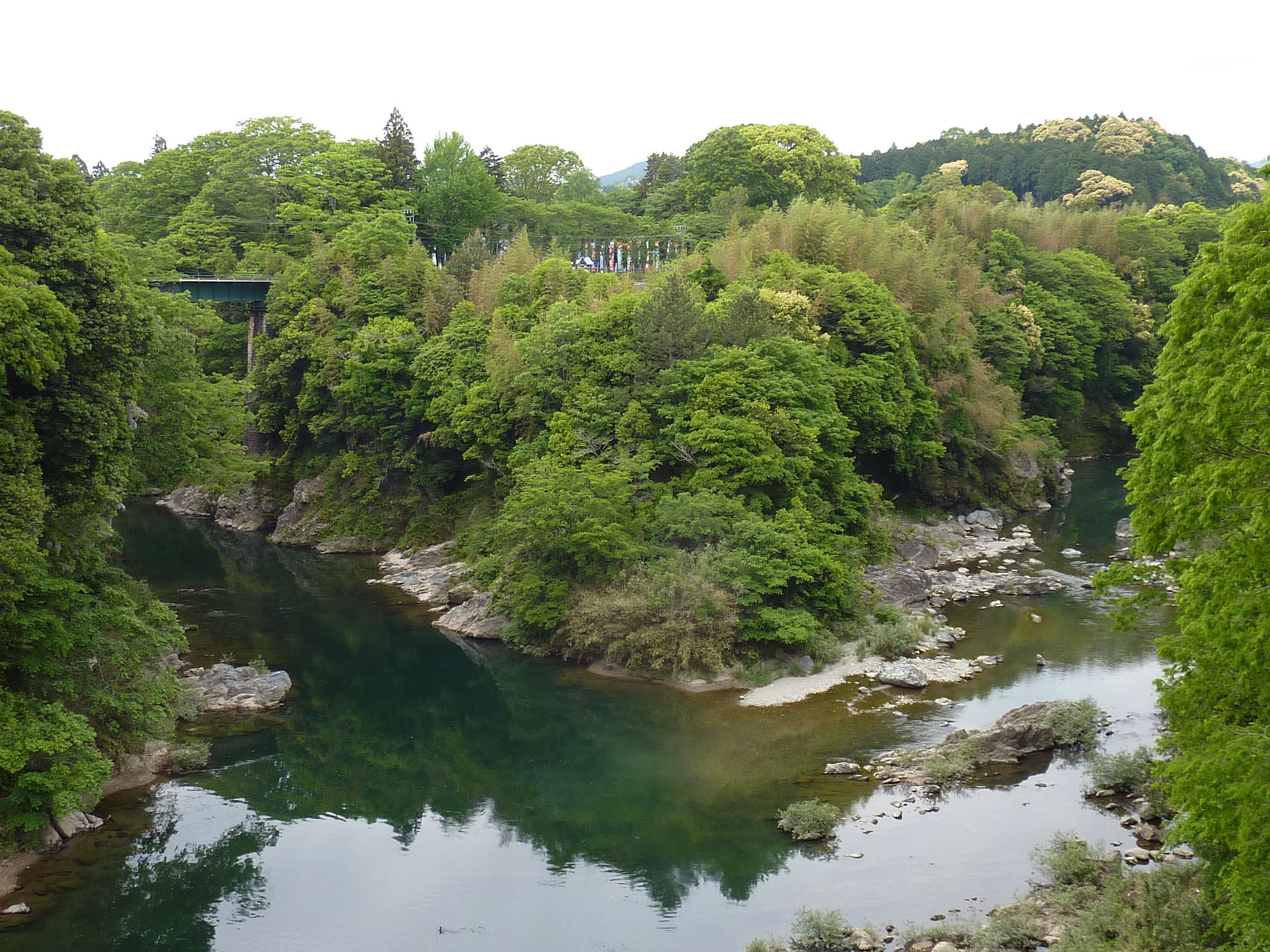
- Site of former Nagashino Castle

Site information
- Type: flatland-style Japanese castle
- Open to the public: yes

Location
- Location within Aichi Prefecture Location within Japan

Site history
- Built: 1508
- Built by: Suganuma Motonari
- In use: Sengoku period
- Demolished: 1576
- Battles/wars: Battle of Nagashino (1575)

Nagashino Castle (長篠城, Nagashino-jō) was a Sengoku period Japanese castle located in what is now Shinshiro, eastern Aichi Prefecture, Japan. It is noteworthy as the site of the crucial Battle of Nagashino between the combined forces of Tokugawa Ieyasu and Oda Nobunaga against Takeda Katsuyori in 1575. The ruins have been protected as a National Historic Site since 1929, the first time a former castle site had received such protection.

== Background ==
Nagashino Castle is placed on a cliff overlooking the confluence of the Kansagawa River (Toyokawa River) and the Uregawa River, in the northeastern portion of what is now the city of Shinshiro. All that remains of the castle today are remnants of moats and some stonework. This location commanded the crossing of the road connecting eastern Mikawa Province with southern Shinano Province and the road connecting Tōtōmi Province with eastern Mino Province.

== History ==
In the Muromachi period, this area of Mikawa Province was controlled by small, petty warlords, which included the Okudaira clan and the Suganuma clan. In 1508, Imagawa Ujichika, ruler of Suruga and Totomi Provinces, ordered his vassal Suganuma Motonari to build a castle at this location Shitara County, Mikawa Province to guard the western approaches to his domains. After the fall of the Imagawa clan at the Battle of Okehazama in 1560, the Suganuma pledged fealty to Tokugawa Ieyasu. However, when Takeda Shingen conquered the Ina region of Shinano Province and threatened northern Mikawa, the Suganuma defected to the Takeda clan.

After Takeda Shingen died in 1573, Tokugawa Ieyasu recovered Nagashino Castle and dispossessed the Suganuma, placing Okudaira Nobumasa as castellan instead. Okudaira Sadamasa had been a vassal of the Takeda, but had defected to the Tokugawa, resulting in the death of his wife and brother, who had been kept hostage by the Takeda to prevent just such an action. Anticipating that Takeda Katsuyori would attack at Nagashino, the Tokugawa and Okudaira strengthened the castle's defenses. The anticipated attack came in May 1575, when the Takeda attacked with an army of 15,000 man and laid siege to Nagashino. Okudaira had a force of only 500 men, and managed to send a messenger to Tokugawa Ieyasu. In the subsequent Battle of Nagashino, the combined forces of Tokugawa Ieyasu and Oda Nobunaga brought a total force of 38,000 men to relieve the siege. Seeking to protect his arquebusiers from the Takeda cavalry, Nobunaga built a number of wooden stockades, behind which his gunners attacked in volleys. By mid-afternoon on the day of the battle, the Takeda broke and fled, after losing a great number of men, including eight of the famous 'Twenty-Four Generals' Katsuyori had inherited from Takeda Shingen. This use of gunfire was a turning point in the history of samurai warfare and the beginning of the end of the Takeda clan.

After the battle, the castle was allowed to fall into ruin. Okudaira Nobumasa received a large territory from Ieyasu and built Shinshiro Castle some distance away from Nagashino. Most of the site has disappeared under modern development; however, a huge clay wall ten meters high and wide moats which surrounded the inner bailey still exist. There is also the Nagashino Castle Ruins Museum (長篠城址史跡保存館, Nagashino-jō Shishiseki Hozonkan) museum on site. The ruins are a 15-minute walk from JR Central Iida Line Nagashinojō Station.

In 2006, the site of Nagashino Castle was listed as No. 46 of the 100 Fine Castles of Japan by the Japan Castle Foundation.

== Gallery ==
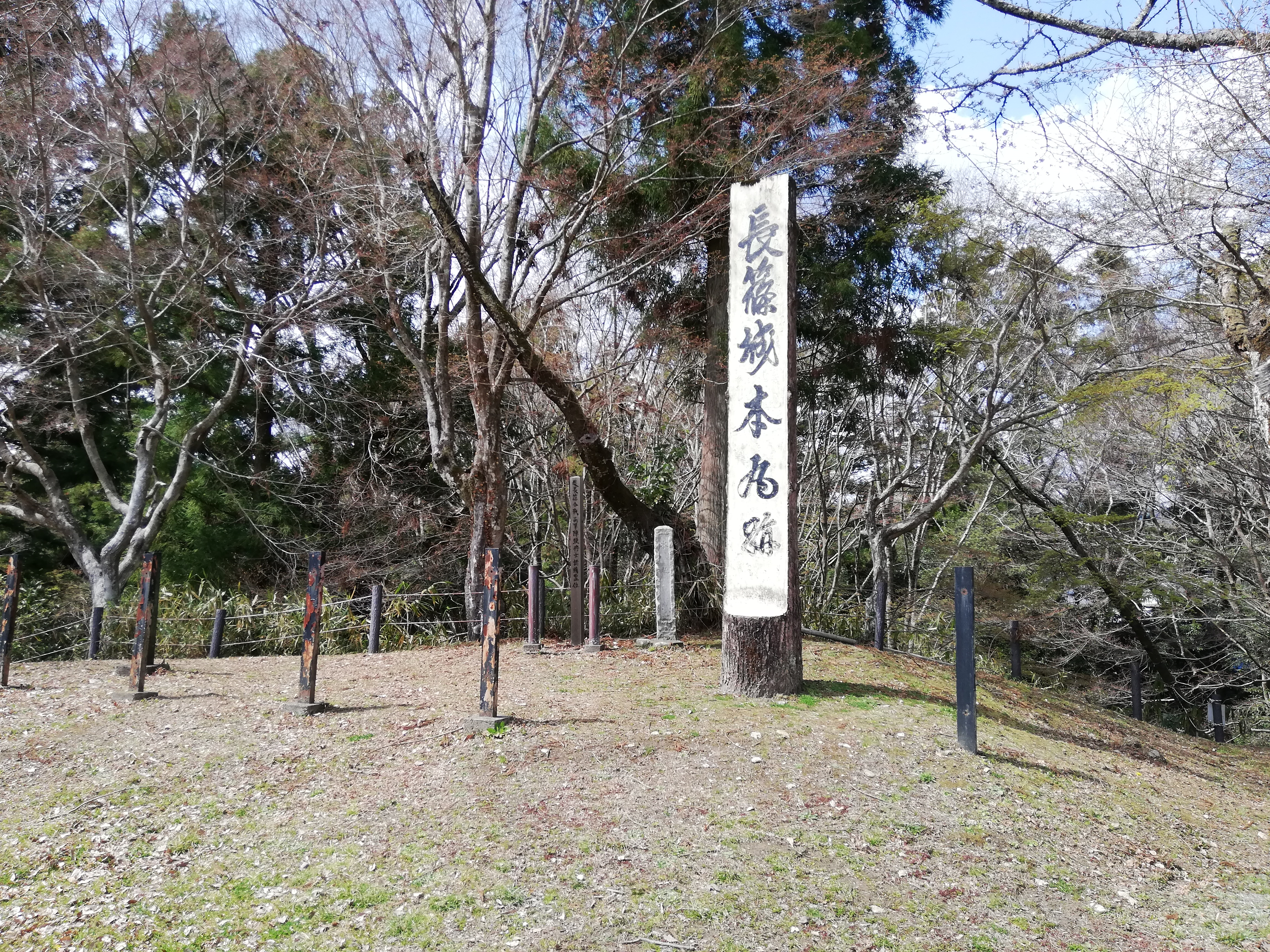
Site of the Main Bailey

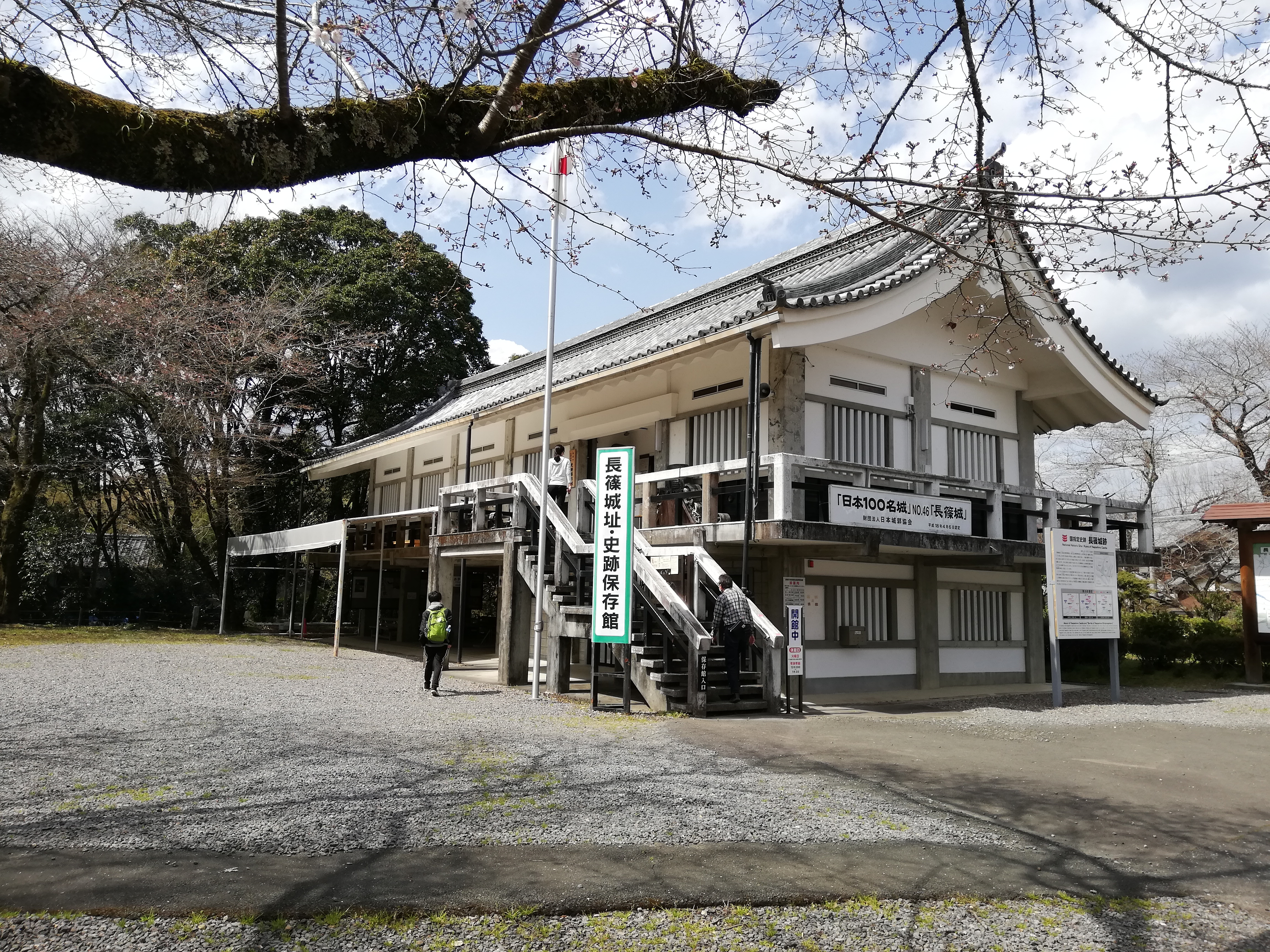
Nagashino Castle Ruins Museum

== See also ==
- List of Historic Sites of Japan (Aichi)
