= Kamehime =

Eldest daughter of Tokugawa Ieyasu

Kamehime (亀姫)
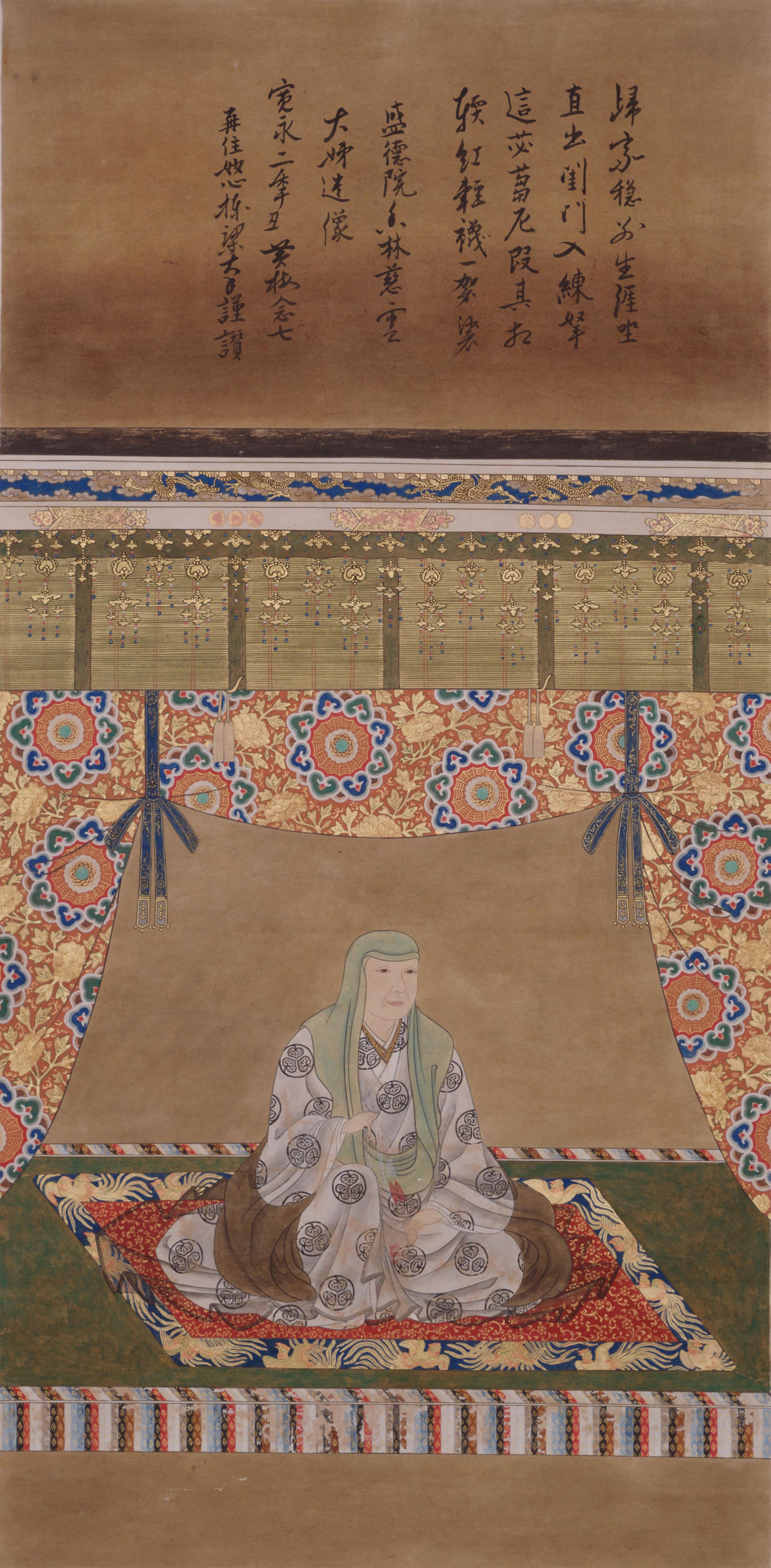

Personal details
- Born: July 27, 1560 Sunpu
- Died: August 1, 1625 (aged 65)
- Spouse: Okudaira Nobumasa
- Children: Okudaira Iemasa (1577–1614) of Utsunomiya DomainM; Matsudaira Ieharu (1579–1592); Matsudaira Tadaaki; Okudaira Tadamasa; Daughter married Okubo Tadatsune of Kisai Domain
- Parent(s): Tokugawa Ieyasu; Lady Tsukiyama

Military service
- Battles/wars: Siege of Nagashino; Suspended Ceiling Incident at Utsunomiya Castle

Kamehime (亀姫, 27 July 1560 – 1 August 1625) was the eldest daughter of Tokugawa Ieyasu, the founder and first shogun of the Tokugawa Shogunate of Japan, with his first wife, Lady Tsukiyama. She was the wife of Okudaira Nobumasa. She is primarily recognized as the eldest offspring of Ieyasu, notable for her active participation in the Siege of Nagashino and her significant role in the events leading to the downfall of Honda Masazumi.

== Biography ==
=== Early life and family ===
Kamehime was a prominent lady of the Sengoku period, born in the year 1560 in Sunpu. She held a significant position in the tumultuous times of feudal Japan. Kamehime was the eldest daughter of Matsudaira Motoyasu, who later became famous as Tokugawa Ieyasu, and his formal wife, Lady Tsukiyama.

=== Marriage, Siege of Nagashino and Family Life ===
In the year 1573, during a period marked by political maneuvering and alliances, Ieyasu sought to engage the Okudaira clan to counter the influence of the Takeda clan in Okumikawa, a mountainous region in the northeast part of Mikawa Province. This endeavor led to the proposal of Kamehime's marriage to Okudaira Nobumasa, the lord of Shinshiro Castle, as part of a larger alliance orchestrated by Oda Nobunaga.

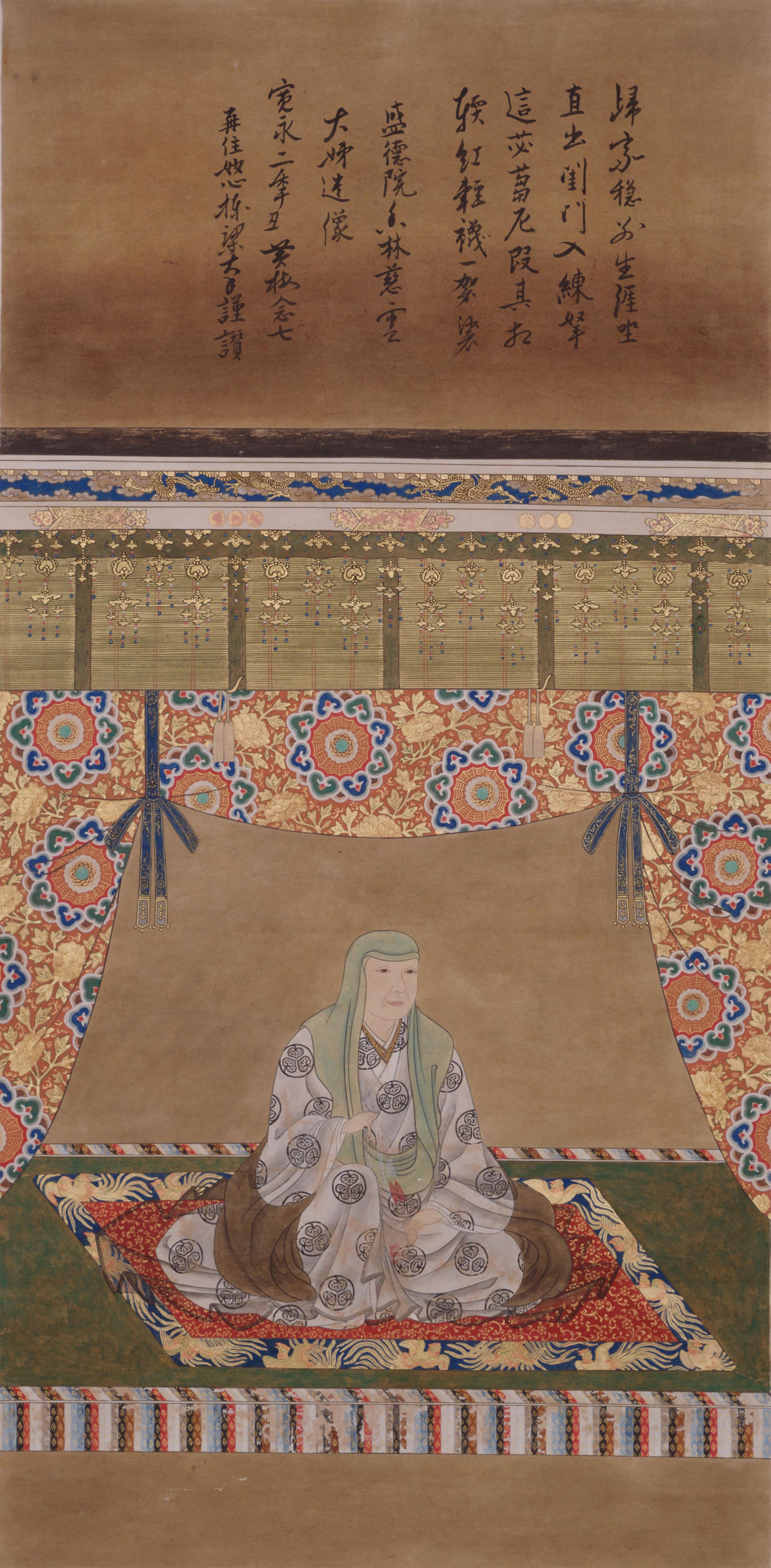
Portrait of Kamehime

Kamehime married Okudaira Nobumasa in 1576. The marriage was arranged as a reward for Nobumasa, who had proven himself as the guardian of Nagashino Castle. It is said that her dowry included one of the twenty-one prized writing boxes crafted by Koami masters. She is known to have acted actively in the siege of Nagashino. Kamehime helped her husband and send Torii Suneemon on the mission to cross the enemy army to request aid to her father, Ieyasu in Okazaki and defended the Nagashino castle.

=== Battle of Sekigahara and the foundation of Tokugawa Shogunate ===
Kamehime's father intentions in the Battle of Sekigahara were shaped by his desire to consolidate power, secure his position in a fractured Japan, and lay the foundation for the Tokugawa shogunate. His strategic vision and diplomatic finesse were instrumental in achieving these objectives. The Sekigahara campaign was triggered by the passing of the imperial regent, Toyotomi Hideyoshi. Following his demise, two opposing factions emerged vying for supremacy: the Western army under the leadership of Ishida Mitsunari and the Eastern army led by Tokugawa Ieyasu. Kamehime's husband aligned with the Eastern army to lend his support to his father-in-law's cause.

After the Eastern Army's victory at the Battle of Sekigahara in 1601, Nobumasa was granted a fief of 100,000 koku in Kanō, Mino Province. Kamehime moved to Kanō with her third son, Tadamasa, and adopted the titles Kanō-gozen or Kanō-no-kata.

However, tragedy struck Kamehime's family with the successive deaths of her sons Tadamasa and Iemasa, followed by the passing of her husband, Nobumasa, in 1615. Subsequently, Kamehime decided to become a Buddhist nun, undergoing the rites of tonsure and adopting the name Seitokuin. She then took on the role of guardian for her grandson, Okudaira Tadataka, who succeeded Tadamasa.

=== Suspended Ceiling Incident at Utsunomiya Castle ===
In the year 1614, Kamehime's eldest son, Okudaira Iemasa, died due to illness. He was succeeded by his young son, Okudaira Tadamasa, who was only seven years old at the time. In 1619, at the age of twelve, Tadamasa was transferred to the Koga domain in Shimōsa Province, while Honda Masazumi was assigned as his replacement in the Utsunomiya domain.

Kamehime harbored ill feelings towards Masazumi due to his involvement in the demotion of Ōkubo Tadachika, a hereditary daimyō, who had close ties to the Okudaira clan. She believed that Masazumi and his father, Honda Masanobu, had conspired to bring about Tadachika's downfall. Kamehime was also puzzled by the transfer of her grandson Tadamasa to another province, as it happened after he had turned twelve, rather than when he was initially appointed at the age of seven. She questioned the increase in the Okudaira family's fief in Utsunomiya from 100,000 koku to 150,000 koku under Masazumi's rule.

During a visit by Tokugawa Hidetada, her younger brother from a different mother and the second shōgun of the Edo bakufu, to Nikkō to pay homage at a shrine, he stayed in Utsunomiya Castle. It was during this visit that Kamehime was suspected of revealing a plot by Masazumi to assassinate Hidetada via a suspended ceiling in the bathing room. Despite the absence of an actual suspended ceiling, Masazumi was banished, and Tadamasa was reinstated in the Utsunomiya domain.

=== Later Years and Death ===
Kamehime died in 1625 at the age of sixty-six. Her final resting places are located at the Kōkoku Temple in the city of Gifu, Gifu Prefecture, the Hōzō Temple in the city of Okazaki, Aichi Prefecture, and the Daizen Temple in the city of Shinshiro, Aichi Prefecture. She outlived all of her four younger sisters.

== Anecdotes ==
One intriguing anecdote relates to the relocation of the Okudaira family from Utsunomiya in Shimotsuke to Koga in Shimōsa. According to the story, when transferring residences, the prevailing laws required occupants to leave behind fixtures and items for the incoming families. In a remarkable turn of events, the Okudaira clan removed sliding screens, sliding doors, tatami mats, and even bamboo trees from their previous premises. Retainers of Masazumi pursued the Okudaira party and managed to stop them at the border, resulting in the return of the items. However, the veracity of this story remains unconfirmed.

== Family ==
- Father: Tokugawa Ieyasu
- Mother: Lady Tsukiyama
- Husband: Okudaira Nobumasa
- Children:
  - Okudaira Iemasa (1577–1614) of Utsunomiya Domain.
  - Matsudaira Ieharu (1579–1592).
  - Matsudaira Tadaaki
  - Okudaira Tadamasa
  - Daughter married Okubo Tadatsune of Kisai Domain.

== Legacy ==
Since April 2008, Kamehime has been characterized as a navigator for a municipal administration program produced in Shinshiro City, Aichi Prefecture. The street in front of Kokoku-ji Temple, where her grave is located, has been maintained as "Kamehime-dori" following the redevelopment work in front of Shinshiro Station.
