= Okudaira Nobumasa =

Japanese warlord (1555–1615)

- 奥平 信昌
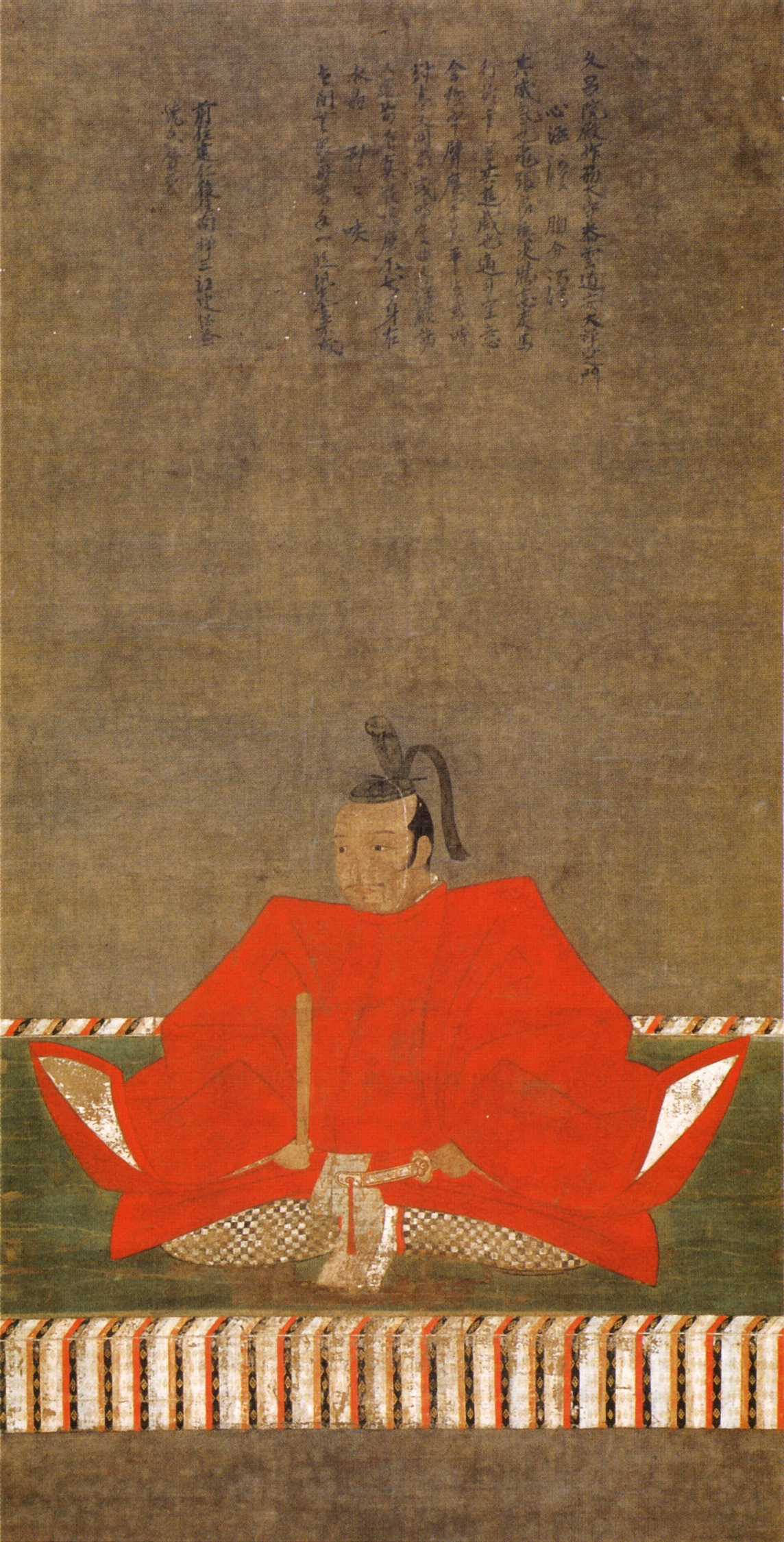

Lord of Nagashino
- In office 1573–1601

Lord of Kanō
- In office 1601–1602
- Succeeded by: Okudaira Tadamasa

Personal details
- Born: Sadamasa; 1555
- Died: 11 April 1615 (aged 59–60)
- Spouse: Kamehime
- Parent: Okudaira Sadayoshi (father)
- Relatives: Tokugawa Ieyasu (father-in-law)

Military service
- Allegiance: Tokugawa clan Takeda clan Oda clan Eastern army Tokugawa Shogunate
- Rank: Kyoto Shoshidai
- Commands: Nagashino castle Kanō Castle
- Battles/wars: Battle of Nagashino (1575); Battle of Komaki-Nagakute (1584); Siege of Ueda (1600)

Okudaira Nobumasa (奥平 信昌; 1555 – April 11, 1615), also called Okudaira Sadamasa (Japanese: 奥平 貞昌), was a Japanese daimyō of the Sengoku and early Edo periods. Nobumasa's family considered their origins to have been associated with Mikawa Province. The clan was descended through the Akamatsu from the Murakami-Genji.

== Biography ==
When Nobumasa was born, he was called Okudaira Sadamasa (奥平 貞昌). He was the son of Okudaira Sadayoshi, an influential local figure in Mikawa. The Okudaira family were originally retainers of the Tokugawa, but were forced to join Takeda Shingen.

In 1573, after Shingen died and Katsuyori assumed leadership of the Takeda clan, Okudaira Sadamasa walked his men out of Tsukude Castle and rejoined the Tokugawa. Katsuyori had Sadamasa's wife and brother – hostages to the Takeda – crucified for what the Takeda construed as betrayal.

Tokugawa allowed Nobumasa to marry his eldest daughter, Kamehime; and he was given Nagashino Castle. Sadamasa was entrusted with the defense of Nagashino Castle by Tokugawa Ieyasu.

Sadamasa's decision to remove himself and his forces from the Takeda supporters became one of the antecedents of the Battle of Nagashino in 1575. Katsuyori was enraged at Sadamasa's decision to leave the Takeda forces. Nagashino Castle was attacked by Katsuyori with a force of 15,000 troops; but Sadamasa held firm, repelling the Takeda siege until forces of a Tokugawa-Oda alliance eventually arrived to support the beleaguered Okudaira. Oda Nobunaga was so impressed by the Okudaira's performance in the battle that he offered Sadamasa the honor of adopting part of his name—Nobu. After the battle was won, the hardy warrior was changed from Sadamasa to Nobumasa.

In 1590, after Ieyasu moved to Kanto region, Nobumasa was given a fief in Miyazaki, Kōzuke.

In 1600, at the Sekigahara Campaign, he participated in the Siege of Ueda (the family history and Nakatsu-han shi (history record of Nakatsu Domain) described that he belonged to the Tokugawa Hidetada's army. Later, Nobumasa served as the first Kyoto Shoshidai of the Edo period.

When Nobumasa completed his service as Kyoto shoshidai in 1601, he was transferred to Kanō Domain in Mino Province. He built Kanō Castle in Gifu, Gifu Prefecture, and commissioned the building of Kanō Tenman-gū.

In 1602, he retired in Kano and handed over the position of the lord of the Kano Castle to the third son Okudaira Tadamasa.

In 1614, he outlived Tadamasa and even the first son Okudaira Iemasa in Utsunomiya Domain at Shimotsuke Province, in 1615 the following year he died.

== Daihannya sword ==
The name ("Daihannya") refers to the Daihannya sutra, made by Junkei Nagamitsu. The sword is in the possession of Oda Nobunaga who gave it to Tokugawa Ieyasu at the Battle of Anegawa, who then gave it to Nobumasa at the Battle of Nagashino. The value of the sword during the Muromachi period, 600 kan, was associated with the sutra's 600 volumes; said to have belonged to the Ashikaga clan.

== Notes ==
Preceded by none	1st (Okudaira) Daimyō of Obata; 1590–1601	Succeeded by Mizuno Tadakiyo
Preceded by none	1st (Okudaira) Daimyō of Kanō; 1601–1602	Succeeded by Okudaira Tadamasa
Preceded by none	1st Kyoto Shoshidai; 1600–1601	Succeeded by Itakura Katsushige
