= Naotora: The Lady Warlord =

2017 taiga drama about female warlord Ii Naotora

- Promotional poster
- Written by: Yoshiko Morishita
- Directed by: Kazutaka Watanabe; Mitsuhiro Fukui; Hideki Fujinami; Takashi Fukagawa; Naoki Murahashi; Daisuke Andō
- Starring: Ko Shibasaki; Haruma Miura; Issey Takahashi; Yūya Yagira; Masaki Suda; Tetta Sugimoto; Naomi Zaizen; Shihori Kanjiya; Hayato Ichihara; Nanao; Tsuyoshi Muro; Yūma Yamoto; Miou Tanaka; Kai Inowaki; Jun Hashimoto; Onoe Matsuya II; Sadao Abe; Gin Maeda; Ichikawa Ebizō XI; Komaki Kurihara; Ruriko Asaoka; Ken Matsudaira; Kaoru Kobayashi
- Narrated by: Nakamura Baijaku II
- Theme music composer: Yoko Kanno
- Opening theme: "Ten-tora～Tiger Woman (TV Size)" (「天虎～虎の女 (TVサイズ）」) by Paavo Järvi and Lang Lang
- Composer: Yoko Kanno
- Country of origin: Japan
- Original language: Japanese
- No. of episodes: 50

Production
- Executive producer: Yukie Okamoto
- Producer: Hirotaka Matsukawa
- Running time: 45 minutes

Original release
- Network: NHK
- Release: January 8 – December 17, 2017

Naotora: The Lady Warlord (Japanese: おんな城主 直虎, Hepburn: Onna Jōshu Naotora) is a 2017 Japanese historical drama television series and the 56th NHK taiga drama. It is written by Yoshiko Morishita and stars Ko Shibasaki as Ii Naotora.

== Plot ==
During the Sengoku period, the Ii family governs the Totomi region. Due to many past wars, there are no more male successors left to become a lord. Naotora Ii (Kou Shibasaki), the only daughter of the lord, now becomes a lord. She faces a difficult period. The constant love from her fiancé, whom she became engaged to at a young age, helps her to keep moving forward.

== Cast ==
=== Ii clan ===
- Ko Shibasaki as Ii Naotora
  - Miu Arai as Otowa (young Naotora)
- Haruma Miura as Ii Naochika
  - Kanata Fujimoto as Kamenojō (young Naochika)
- Masaki Suda as Ii Naomasa, the adopted son of Naotora
  - Kokoro Terada as Toramatsu (young Naomasa)
- Tetta Sugimoto as Ii Naomori
- Naomi Zaizen as Chika
- Shihori Kanjiya as Shino
- Gin Maeda as Ii Naohira
- Mari Hanafusa as Sana
- Takashi Ukaji as Ii Naomitsu
- Aki Asakura as Takase, Naomasa's half-sister
  - Hikaru Takahashi as young Takase
- Shunsuke Kariya as Niino Chikanori
- Yasuko Mitsuura as Ayame
- Aoi Yoshikura as Kikyō
- Marin as Sakura
- Tsuyoshi Muro as Seto Hōkyū, a financial advisor
- Yuki Yamada as Ihara "Suke'emon" Tomomasa
- Masayo Umezawa as Take and Ume

Ono family

- Issey Takahashi as Ono Masatsugu, a.k.a. "Tajima no kami"
  - Kai Kobayashi as Tsurumaru (young Masatsugu)
- Mitsuru Fukikoshi as Ono Masanao, the father of Masatsugu
- Yoshio Inoue as Ono Genba
- Sayaka Yamaguchi as Natsu
- Kai Inowaki as Ono Manpuku
  - Taketo Arai as Ono Inosuke (young Manpuku)

Nakano family

- Toshio Kakei as Nakano Naoyoshi
- Yūma Yamoto as Nakano "Yukinoji" Naoyuki
- Keisuke Tomita as Nakano Naohisa

Okuyama family

- Denden as Okuyama Tomotoshi, Shino's father
- Miou Tanaka as Okuyama "Rokuza" Rokuzaemon

Monks of Ryōtan-ji

- Kaoru Kobayashi as Nankei Osho
- Hayato Ichihara as Ketsuzan
- Shigekazu Komatsu as Kōten

Peasants

- Gaku Yamamoto as Jinbei
- Takashi Yamanaka as Hachisuke
- Kou Maehara as Kakutarō
- Takehiro Kimoto (TKO) as Tomisuke
- Takayuki Kinoshita (TKO) as Fukuzō

=== Imagawa clan ===
- Shunpūtei Shōta as Imagawa Yoshimoto, the master of the Ii clan
- Ruriko Asaoka as Jukeini, the mother of Yoshimoto
- Onoe Matsuya II as Imagawa Ujizane, Yoshimoto's heir
  - Tsubasa Nakagawa as young Ujizane
- Shirō Sano as Taigen Sessai
- Kenichi Yajima as Sekiguchi Ujitsune
- Aki Nishihara as Haru (Lady Hayakawa), the wife of Ujizane and a daughter of Hōjō Ujiyasu
- Hidetoshi Hoshida as a fake Ieyasu
- Kyūsaku Shimada as Ōsawa Mototane
- Kazutoyo Yoshimi as Nakayasu Hyōbu
- Kazuyuki Aijima as Yamamura Shuri
- Asahi Yoshida as Asahina Yasukatsu

Iinoya Triumvirate

- Daikichi Sugawara as Suzuki Shigetoki
- Jun Hashimoto as Kondō Yasumochi
- Masanobu Sakata as Suganuma Tadahisa

=== Tokugawa clan ===
- Sadao Abe as Tokugawa Ieyasu
- Nanao as Sena
  - Seira Niwa as young Sena
- Kinari Hirano as Matsudaira Nobuyasu
  - Raiki Komino as Takechiyo (young Nobuyasu)
- Komaki Kurihara as Odai no Kata, the mother of Ieyasu
- Seiji Rokkaku as Honda Masanobu
- Ozuno Nakamura as Ishikawa Kazumasa
- Tetsu Watanabe as Ōkubo Tadayo
- Moro Moro'oka as Hiraiwa Chikayoshi
- Soran Tamoto as Kogorō (Sakai Ietsugu)

The Four Heavenly Kings of the Tokugawa

- Minosuke as Sakai Tadatsugu
- Masahiro Takashima as Honda Tadakatsu
- Toshinori Omi as Sakakibara Yasumasa

Matsushita

- Masato Wada as Matsushita Jōkei, a spy
- Kanji Furutachi as Matsushita Gentarō

=== Oda clan ===
- Ichikawa Ebizō XI as Oda Nobunaga
- Ken Mitsuishi as Akechi Mitsuhide
- Sora Uehara as Tokuhime
- Ryōta Sakanishi as Sakuma Nobumori
- Shōzō Uesugi as Mizuno Tadashige
- Seiji Kinoshita as Hasegawa Hidekazu
- Rei Tanaka as Jinen, Mitsuhide's son

=== Takeda clan ===
- Ken Matsudaira as Takeda Shingen
- Eita Okuno as Takeda Katsuyori
- Oreno Graffiti as Takeda Yoshinobu
- Mari Kishi as Suzu, the wife of Yoshinobu and a sister of Imagawa Ujizane
- Ryūji Yamamoto as Yamagata Masakage
- Yōji Tanaka as Anayama Nobutada

=== Later Hōjō clan ===
- Shinobu Tsuruta as Hōjō Ujiyasu
- Tōru Shinagawa as Hōjō Gen'an
- Etsuo Yokobori as Ogasawara Yasuhiro

=== Ryūun-maru's Bandits ===
- Yūya Yagira as Ryūun-maru
  - Kōta Noura as young Ryūun-maru
- Makita Sports as Mogura
- Togi Makabe as Rikiya
- Kengo Yoshida as Kaji
- Kōki Maeda as Gokū
- Takashi Ashida as Kuwa

=== Merchants of Kiga ===
- Hirotarō Honda as Nakamura Yodayū
- Takashi Matsuo as Iseya
- Ichirō Ogura as Kumanoya

=== Others ===
- Takurō Tatsumi as Chaya Shirōjirō Kiyonobu
- Misaki Momose as Akane
- Dankan as Negi
- Yu Inaba
- G.G. Sato
- Moemi Katayama
- Hajime Okayama as Gohei
- Mansaku Fuwa
- Yusuke Kodama
- Shōdai Fukuyama
- Yoshiyuki Morishita
- Shigemitsu Ogi
- Wataru Murakami

== Family tree ==
Ii Naohira b. 1489 or 1479 (Gin Maeda)
Sekiguchi Chikanaga b. 1518	Sana (Mari Hanafusa)	Nankei (Kaoru Kobayashi)	Naomitsu (Takashi Ukaji)	Naomune
Oda Nobunaga b. 1534 (Ichikawa Ebizō XI)	Tokugawa Ieyasu b. 1543 (Sadao Abe)	Sena b. 1542 (Nanao)	Shino (Shihori Kanjiya)	Naochika b. 1536 (Haruma Miura)	Naomori b. 1526 (Tetta Sugimoto)	Chika (Naomi Zaizen)	Niino Chikanori (Shunsuke Kariya)
Tokuhime b. 1559	Matsudaira Nobuyasu b.1559 (Kinari Hirano)	Naomasa b. 1561 (Masaki Suda)	Naotora (Ko Shibasaki)

== Production ==
Production Credits

- Music – Yoko Kanno
- Title designer – Maaya Wakasugi
- Historical research – Tetsuo Owada
- Architectural research – Kiyoshi Hirai
- Clothing research – Hiroaki Koizumi

=== Casting ===
Ko Shibasaki was announced to portray the lead role of the warlord Ii Naotora on August 25, 2015. The rest of the main cast was announced on May 26, 2016, which included Tetta Sugimoto, Naomi Zaizen, Gin Maeda, Kaoru Kobayashi, Haruma Miura, Issey Takahashi, and Yūya Yagira among others. The third cast announcement on July 12, 2016 included Shunpūtei Shōta, Once Matsuya II, Ruriko Asaoka, Sadao Abe, Nanao, Masaki Suda, and Hayato Ichihara among others.

=== Filming ===
The usual taiga drama production would first have one-third of the expected number of scripts finished before shooting begins. Afterwards, audience reception is taken into account as the rest of the series is written and shot. Filming began in September 2016.

=== Music ===
Yoko Kanno was announced as the series composer on November 16, 2016. By December 6, Paavo Järvi and Lang Lang were announced as the performers for the series' theme music.

== Marketing ==
On November 16, 2016, the first visual poster for Naotora: The Lady Warlord was released. A trailer for the drama was later released in December 2016.

Kotobukiya released Naotora-themed chopsticks in January 2017 to coincide with the series' broadcast.

== TV schedule ==
Episode	Title	Directed by	Original airdate	Rating
1	"Iinoya no Shōjo" (井伊谷の少女)	Kazutaka Watanabe	January 8, 2017	16.9%
2	"Gakeppuchi no Hime" (崖っぷちの姫)	Kazutaka Watanabe	January 15, 2017	15.5%
3	"Otowa Kiki ippatsu" (おとわ危機一髪)	Kazutaka Watanabe	January 22, 2017	14.3%
4	"Onago ni koso are Jirōhōshi" (女子にこそあれ次郎法師)	Mitsuhiro Fukui	January 29, 2017	16.0%
5	"Kamenojō Kaeru" (亀之丞帰る)	Kazutaka Watanabe	February 5, 2017	16.0%
6	"Hatsukoi no Wakaremichi" (初恋の別れ道)	Kazutaka Watanabe	February 12, 2017	14.5%
7	"Kenchi ga yattekita" (検地がやってきた)	Mitsuhiro Fukui	February 19, 2017	12.9%
8	"Akachan wa madaka" (赤ちゃんはまだか)	Mitsuhiro Fukui	February 26, 2017	13.4%
9	"Okehazama ni Shisu" (桶狭間に死す)	Hideki Fujinami	March 5, 2017	14.0%
10	"Hashire Ryūgūkozō" (走れ竜宮小僧)	Hideki Fujinami	March 12, 2017	12.5%
11	"Saraba Itoshiki Hito yo" (さらば愛しき人よ)	Kazutaka Watanabe	March 19, 2017	13.7%
12	"Onna jōshu Naotora" (おんな城主直虎)	Kazutaka Watanabe	March 26, 2017	12.9%
13	"Jōshu wa Tsurai yo" (城主はつらいよ)	Kazutaka Watanabe	April 2, 2017	13.1%
14	"Tokuseirei no Yukue" (徳政令の行方)	Mitsuhiro Fukui	April 9, 2017	12.9%
15	"Onna jōshu tai Onna daimyō" (おんな城主対おんな大名)	Mitsuhiro Fukui	April 16, 2017	14.4%
16	"Watage no An" (綿毛の案)	Hideki Fujinami	April 23, 2017	13.7%
17	"Kesareta Tanegashima" (消された種子島)	Hideki Fujinami	April 30, 2017	11.0%
18	"Arui wa Uragiri toiu Na no Tsuru" (あるいは裏切りという名の鶴)	Hideki Fujinami	May 7, 2017	14.3%
19	"Tsumi to Batsu" (罪と罰)	Kazutaka Watanabe	May 14, 2017	13.6%
20	"Daisan no Onna" (第三の女)	Hideki Fujinami	May 21, 2017	14.5%
21	"Nushi no Na wa" (ぬしの名は)	Kazutaka Watanabe	May 28, 2017	13.2%
22	"Tora to Ryū" (虎と龍)	Kazutaka Watanabe	June 4, 2017	12.1%
23	"Tōzoku wa Nido Hotoke wo Nusumu" (盗賊は二度仏を盗む)	Takashi Fukagawa	June 11, 2017	12.3%
24	"Sayonara dakega Jinsei ka?" (さよならだけが人生か？)	Takashi Fukagawa	June 18, 2017	12.4%
25	"Zaimoku wo daite Tobe" (材木を抱いて飛べ)	Hideki Fujinami	June 25, 2017	12.3%
26	"Tagatameni Shiro wa aru" (誰がために城はある)	Kazutaka Watanabe	July 2, 2017	12.4%
27	"Kiga wo Waga Teni" (気賀を我が手に)	Kazutaka Watanabe	July 9, 2017	12.4%
28	"Shi no Chōmen" (死の帳面)	Naoki Murahashi	July 16, 2017	12.0%
29	"Onna tachi no Banka" (女たちの挽歌)	Mitsuhiro Fukui	July 23, 2017	11.9%
30	"Tsubusarezaru Mono" (潰されざる者)	Hideki Fujinami	July 30, 2017	11.3%
31	"Toramatsu no Kubi" (虎松の首)	Hideki Fujinami	August 6, 2017	10.6%
32	"Fukkatsu no Hi" (復活の火)	Naoki Murahashi	August 13, 2017	12.0%
33	"Kiraware-Masatsugu no Isshō" (嫌われ政次の一生)	Kazutaka Watanabe	August 20, 2017	12.4%
34	"Kakushiminato no Ryūun-maru" (隠し港の龍雲丸)	Kazutaka Watanabe	August 27, 2017	11.2%
35	"Yomigaerishi Monotachi" (蘇えりし者たち)	Kazutaka Watanabe	September 3, 2017	11.3%
36	"Ii-ke Saigo no Hi" (井伊家最後の日)	Mitsuhiro Fukui	September 10, 2017	12.1%
37	"Takeda ga Kitarite Hi wo Hanatsu" (武田が来たりて火を放つ)	Hideki Fujinami	September 17, 2017	13.3%
38	"Ii wo Tomo ni Sarinu" (井伊を共に去りぬ)	Hideki Fujinami	September 24, 2017	11.7%
39	"Toramatsu no Yabō" (虎松の野望)	Kazutaka Watanabe	October 1, 2017	11.7%
40	"Tenshō no Zōriban" (天正の草履番)	Kazutaka Watanabe	October 8, 2017	11.6%
41	"Kono Genkan no Katasumide" (この玄関の片隅で)	Daisuke Andō	October 15, 2017	11.8%
42	"Nagashino ni Tateru Saku" (長篠に立てる柵)	Mitsuhiro Fukui	October 22, 2017	11.9%
43	"Onshō no Kanata ni" (恩賞の彼方に)	Hideki Fujinami	October 29, 2017	12.9%
44	"Iinoya no Bara" (井伊谷のばら)	Hideki Fujinami	November 5, 2017	11.4%
45	"Maō no Ikenie" (魔王のいけにえ)	Takashi Fukagawa	November 12, 2017	10.7%
46	"Akujo ni Tsuite" (悪女について)	Kazutaka Watanabe	November 19, 2017	12.0%
47	"Kessen wa Takatenjin" (決戦は高天神)	Kazutaka Watanabe	November 26, 2017	11.3%
48	"Nobunaga, Hamamatsu Kitaitteyo" (信長、浜松来たいってよ)	Mitsuhiro Fukui	December 3, 2017	11.9%
49	"Honnō-ji ga Hen" (本能寺が変)	Hideki Fujinami	December 10, 2017	12.0%
50	"Ishi wo Tsugu Mono" (石を継ぐ者)	Kazutaka Watanabe	December 17, 2017	12.5%
Average rating 12.8% - Rating is based on Japanese Video Research(Kantō region).

=== Omnibus ===
Episode	Title	Original airdate	Original airtime
1	"Kore ga Jirō no Ikiru Michi" (これが次郎の生きる道)	December 30, 2017	13:05 - 14:00
2	"Naotora no Kakusei" (直虎の覚醒)	December 30, 2017	14:00 - 15:00
3	"Nigeru wa Haji da ga Toki ni Katsu" (逃げるは恥だが時に勝つ)	December 30, 2017	15:05 - 16:30
4	"Iinoya wa Midori nari" (井伊谷は緑なり)	December 30, 2017	16:30 - 17:43

== Soundtracks ==
- NHK taiga drama Naotora: The Lady Warlord, 音楽虎の巻 イチトラ (Ongaku Tora no Maki: Ichitora) (January 11, 2017)
- NHK taiga drama Naotora: The Lady Warlord, 音楽虎の巻 ニィトラ (Ongaku Tora no Maki: Niitora) (April 5, 2017)
- NHK taiga drama Naotora: The Lady Warlord, 緊急特盤 鶴のうた (Kinkyū Tokuban: Tsuru no Uta) (August 23, 2017)
- NHK taiga drama Naotora: The Lady Warlord, 音楽虎の巻 ベストラ (Ongaku Tora no Maki: Besutora) (December 20, 2017)

== See also ==
- Sengoku period
