= Ryōtan-ji (Hamamatsu) =

Buddhist temple in Hamamatsu, Japan

- 龍潭寺
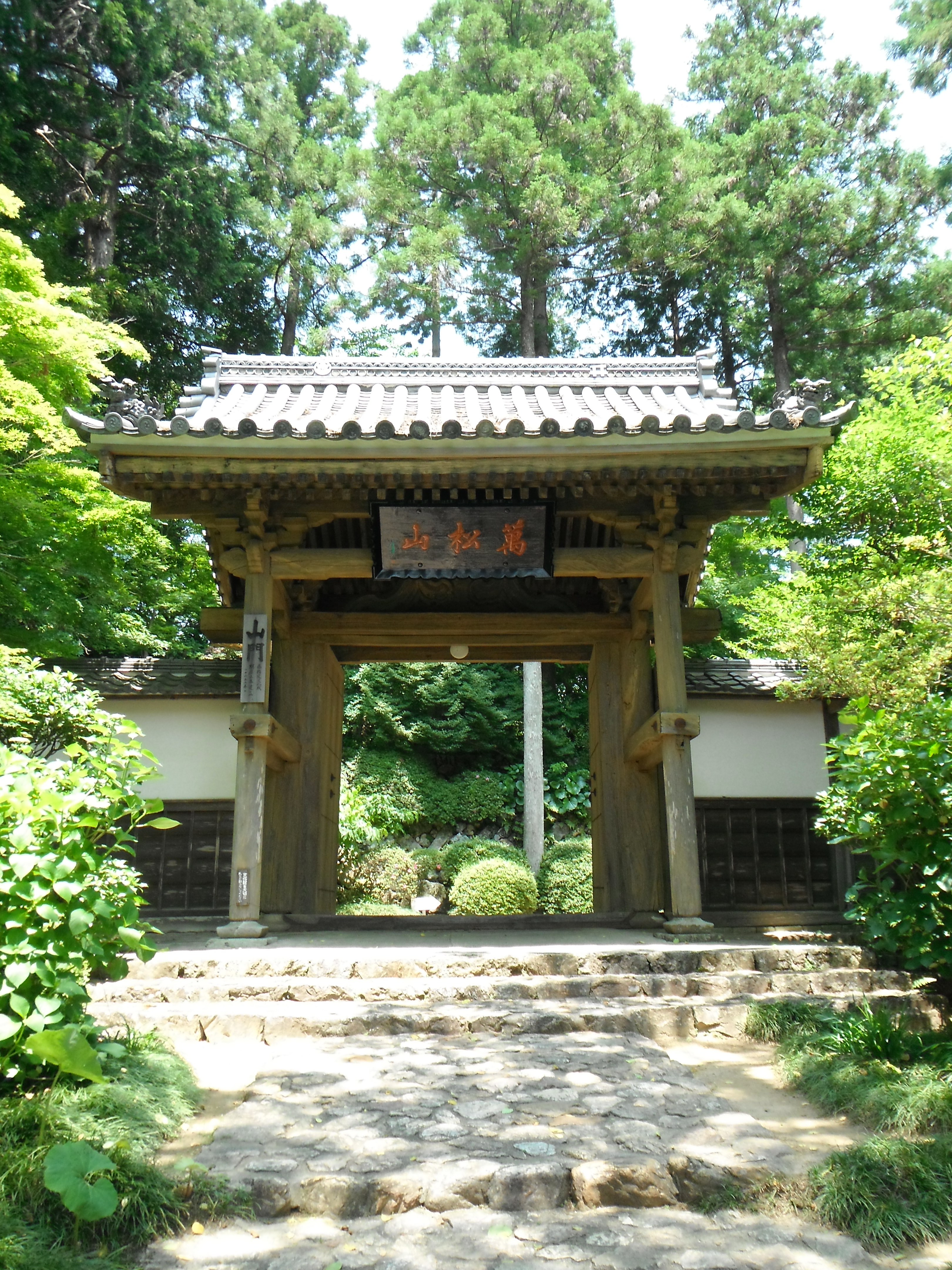
- Ryōtan-ji main hall

- Ryōtan-ji Ryōtan-ji (Hamamatsu) (Japan)

Religion
- Affiliation: Buddhism
- Deity: Kokūzō Bosatsu
- Rite: Rinzai school of Zen

Location
- Location: 1989 Inasachō Iinoya Hamana-ku, Hamamtsu-shi, Shizuoka-ken
- Country: Japan
- Interactive map of Ryōtan-ji
- Coordinates: 34°49′43.1″N 137°40′05.3″E

Architecture
- Founder: unknown
- Completed: c. Nara period?

Website
- www.ryotanji.com/index.html

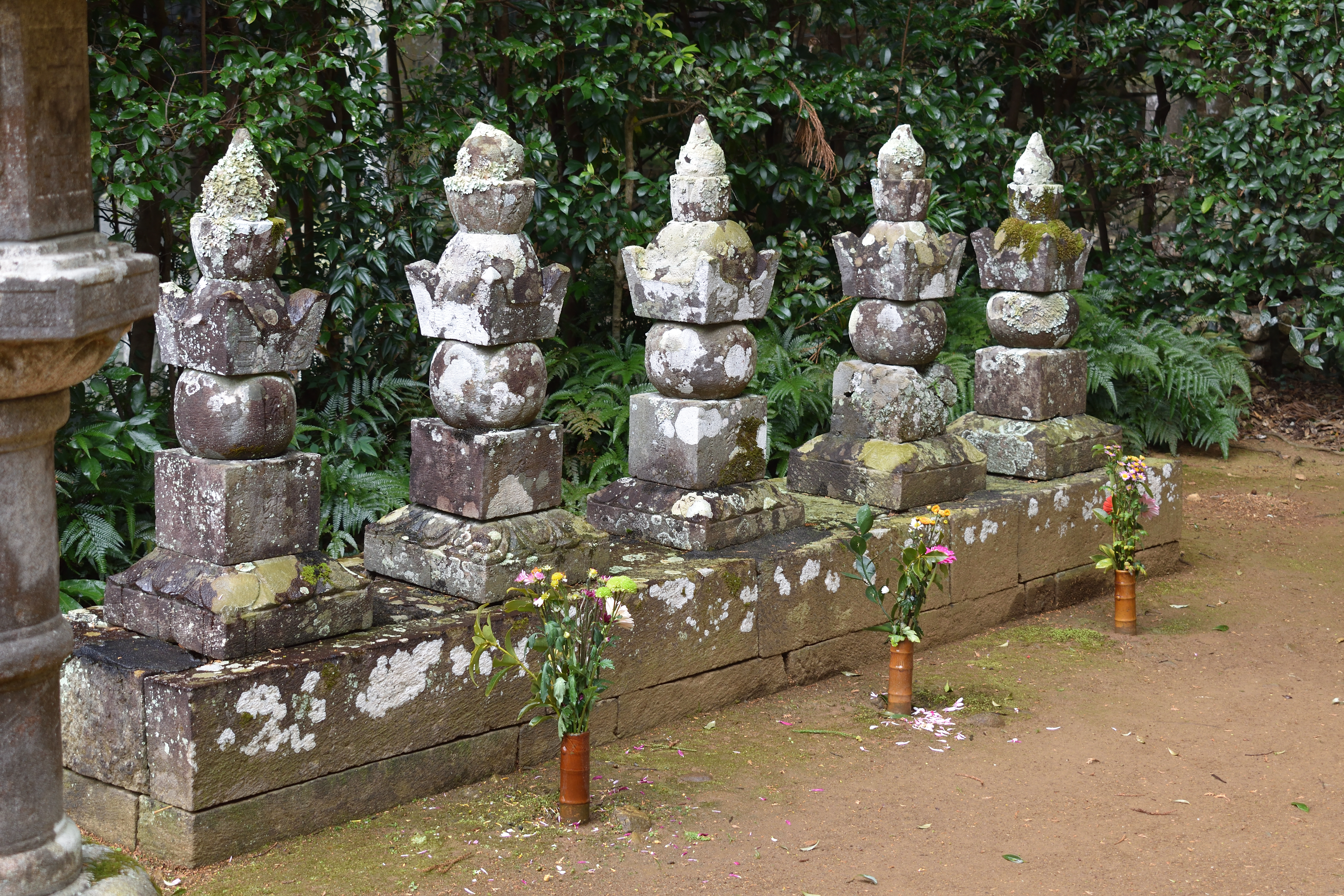
Graves of Ii clan

Ryōtan-ji (龍潭寺) is a Buddhist temple belonging to the Myōshin-ji branch of the Rinzai school of Japanese Zen. located in Hamana-ku, Hamamatsu, Shizuoka Prefecture, Japan. It is the head temple of one of fourteen autonomous branches of the Rinzai school. Its main image is a hibutsu statue of Kokūzō Bosatsu. The temple, including its famed Japanese garden is not open to the general public.

== History ==
The early history of the temple is uncertain, and the temple claims to have been founded in 733 AD by the famed Nara period monk Gyōki as a temple called Jizo-ji (地蔵寺). The temple has been long associated with the Ii clan, as per Ii family records, the clan itself originated when a baby boy was found by the monks beside a well at the temple in the year 1010 AD. The monks raised the infant, who later took the name of Ii Tomoyasu, and who became the progenitor of the Ii clan. His funeral was held at the temple in 1093, and the temple subsequently served as the bodaiji of the clan. During the Nanboku-chō period, Prince Muneyoshi who led the effort of the Southern Court against the forces of Ashikaga Takauji in this area is said to have died in the Iinoya valley where this temple is located and was buried at Ryōtan-ji (although this claim is challenged by a location in Nakatsugawa, Gifu). The temple changed its name to its present name in 1507. During the Sengoku period, the funeral of Ii Naomori was held at this temple in 1560. The graves of Ii Naochika and Ii Naotora are also at this temple. The temple was burned down during an invasion by the Takeda clan in 1570, and was rebuilt during the Edo period. After the establishment of the Tokugawa shogunate, the Ii clan was transferred to Ōmi Province; however, the temple received a fief of properties from the shogunate to compensate it for the loss of its patrons.

== Cultural properties ==
=== Important cultural properties ===
==== Song dynasty encyclopedia ====
Ryōtan-ji has a set of three books (宋版錦繍万花谷 ) from South Song China, which were printed in 1188. These are three surviving volumes from an encyclopedia which was once owned by Oda Nobunaga. One of Nobunaga's sons became a monk at this time. The books were designated Important Cultural Properties in 1978.

=== National Place of Scenic Beauty ===
==== Ryōtan-ji gardens ====
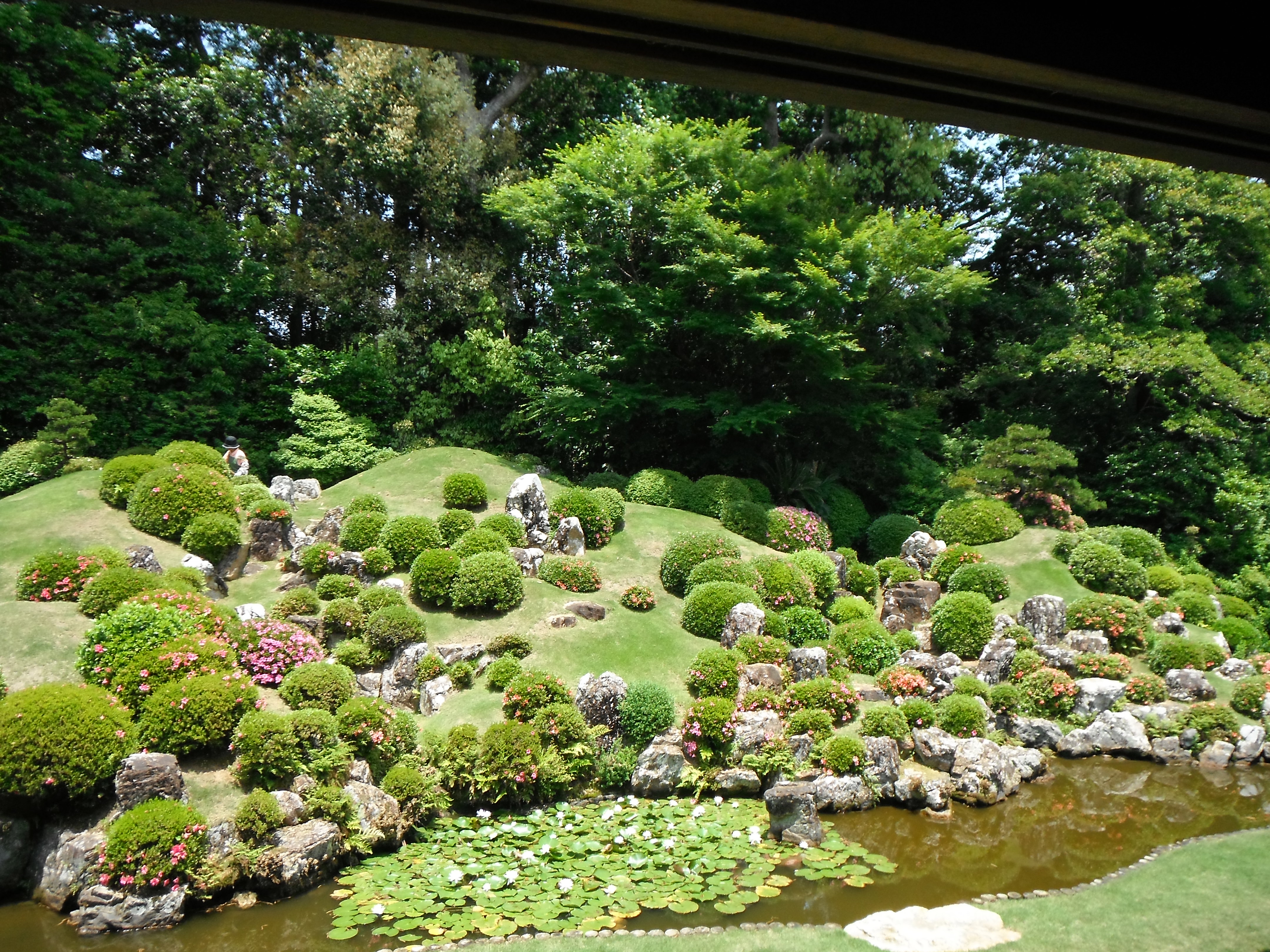
Ryōtan-ji gardens

The Japanese garden on the north side of the Main Hall dates from the early Edo period, and was designed by Kobori Enshu. It consists of an arrangement of rock formations and ponds. It was designated as a National Places of Scenic Beauty of Japan in 1954.

== See also ==
- List of Places of Scenic Beauty of Japan (Shizuoka)
