= Ii Naotora =

Daimyō of the Sengoku period

Ii Naotora 井伊 直虎

Head of Ii clan
- In office 1563 – 1572 (Note: Kazuto Hongo theory source.) / 1582 (Note: "Ii clan Biography" source.)
- Preceded by: Ii Naomori
- Succeeded by: Ii Naomasa

Personal details
- Born: Probably 1530s (Note: "Ii clan Biography" soure.)
- Died: 1572 (Note: Kazuto Hongo theory source.) / September 12, 1582
- Children: Ii Naomasa (adopted) (Note: "Ii clan Biography" source.); Takase (adopted)
- Parent: First theory: Ii Naomori (Note: "Ii clan Biography" source.); Second theory: Sekiguchi Ujitsune (Note: Motoki Kuroda source) (father)
- Relatives: Lady Tsukiyama (daughter of Ii Naohira's daughter) (Note: "Ii clan Biography" theory.)

Military service
- Allegiance: Imagawa clan Tokugawa clan
- Unit: Ii clan

Ii Naotora (井伊 直虎, d. 12 September 1582) was a daimyō of the Sengoku period and head of the Ii clan, a feudal samurai clan of medieval Japan.

There are two theories regarding Naotora's identity:

- The classical theory from Edo period stated Naotora was Jirō Hōshi daughter of Ii Naomori, the eighteenth head of their clan. She was primarily the head of Ii clan and retainer of the Imagawa clan.
- The second theory was that Ii Naotora was actually a son of an Imagawa clan retainer named Sekiguchi Ujitsune (関口氏経). According to this theory, the son of Ujitsune became temporary head of the Ii clan until Ii Naomasa, the son of Ii Naochika, reached adulthood and could inherit the position.

== Identity speculations ==
There are several theories regarding the identity of the head of Ii clan after Ii Naomori. The "Ii clan history" record which now preserved in the Shizuoka central library was the oldest source supporting the theory that Jirō Hōshi (次郎法師), was a female Ii Naotora were from secondary material which first appeared in mid Edo period document which written by a priest at Ryutanji Temple (Hamamatsu City). However, this popular theory is disputed by 20th century academics. The theory that said Ii Naotora was Sekiguchi Ujitsune, son of Imagawa clan subordinate, came from several sources which pointed out by modern researchers.

Theories about Ii Naotora and Jiro Hoshi
Theorist	Relations between them	Gender	Origin	Head of Ii clan
Suzuki Masanori	Different persons	No opinion (Jiro Hoshi); Male (Naotora)	Son of Ii Naomori (Ii Naotora)	Ii Naotora (male)
Kazuto Hongō	Different persons	Female (Jiro Hoshi); Male (Naotora)	Daughter of Ii Naomori (Jiro Hoshi); Son of Sekiguchi Ujitsune (Naotora)	Sekiguchi Naotora (male)
Motoki Kuroda	Same person	Male	Son of Sekiguchi Ujitsune	Sekiguchi Naotora (male)
Watanabe Daimon	Same person	Male	No opinion	Naotora (male)
Atsuyuki Wakabayashi	Different persons	Female (Jiro Hoshi); Male (Naotora)	Daughter of Ii Naomori (Jiro Hoshi); Son of Sekiguchi Ujitsune (Naotora)	Sekiguchi Naotora (male)
Ii Tatsuo	Different persons	Female (Jiro Hoshi); Male (Naotora)	Daughter of Ii Naomori (Jiro Hoshi); Son of Sekiguchi Ujitsune (Naotora)	Sekiguchi Naotora (male)
Tetsuo Owada	Same person	Female	Daughter of Ii Naomori	Jiro Naotora (female)
Michifumi Isoda	Different persons	Female (Jiro Hoshi); Male (Naotora)	Daughter of Ii Naomori (Jiro Hoshi); Son of Sekiguchi Ujitsune (Naotora)	Both (first Jiro Hoshi, then replaced by Naotora)
Hirofumi Yamamoto	Different persons	Female (Jiro Hoshi); Male (Naotora)	Daughter of Ii Naomori (Jiro Hoshi); Son of Sekiguchi Ujitsune (Naotora)	Both (de jure Jiro Hoshi, de facto Naotora)

=== Male Naotora theory ===
Overall, Modern Japanese historians reject the theory of a female head of the Ii clan, such as Kazuto Hongō, history professor of University of Tokyo. Hongō opined the theory of Naotora being a woman were based on speculation of the lack of Ii clan's biological male heir before Ii Naomasa reached adulthood.

Historian Suzuki Masanori speculates that he was the son of Ii Naomori. However, since the Zatsuhisetsu Shaki records that Inojiro was the son of Sekiguchi Echigo-no-Kami (Ujitsune), several researchers have suggested that Naotora was the son of Sekiguchi Ujitsune, he is thought to have married the daughter of II Naomori and become his adopted son-in-law, and this Naotora's wife is thought to be the person who has traditionally been identified as Jiro-hoshi or Naotora (posthumous name Myoun-in-den Tsukifune Yuen-dai-shi).

Researchers from Hikone Castle Museum also deemed the "Ii clan biography" which contains the theory about Ii Naotora being female as unreliable as it was based on folklore and not actual historical records.

Atsuyuki Wakabayashi from Shizuoka University has stated that the letter was co-signed between Jirō Hōshi and Sekiguchi Naotora as an imperial edict.

Ii Tatsuo, the director of the Ii clan Museum in Kyoto which preserved those documents, (Note: museum specializing in the historical examination of armor, arms, and swords, run by Tatsuo Ii, who was adopted by a descendant of the Ii clan) also favored this explanation that Ii Naotora was not a woman named Jirō Hōshi, but instead a male retainer of the Imagawa clan named Sekiguchi Ujitsune, who had been bestowed the fiefdoms of the Ii clan. Furthermore, Ii Tatsuo also stated there is no evidence from a primary source identifying Jirō Hōshi as Ii Naotora. This statement was based on several facts:

- Primary source document which was written by Niino Chikanori, a former retainer of the Imagawa clan who served under Ii Naotora. The document states the identity of Ii Naotora as "Ii Jiro". According to Chikanori, Ii Jiro was the son of "Sekiguchi Ujitsune, Lord of Echigo (Echigo-no-kami)" The Hachisaki temple in Shizuoka Prefecture claimed that they have the replica of the letter dated from 1566 that pointing out the relationship between Naotora with said Sekiguchi clan.
- The theory of Ii Naotora being descendant of the Sekiguchi clan was further expanded as recent Ii museum researchers have found out the supplementary document from "Kawate clan Genealogy" has revealed that before Sekiguchi's appointment as "Ii Naotora", the Ii clan was temporarily handled by Kawate Suisuke Kagetaka, a vassal of the Matsudaira (Tokugawa) clan. This version explains how after Niino Samanosuke, (Naomasa's benefactor who had invited him to Iinoya), was killed in battle in 1564, Kagetaka assisted Naotora and Jirō Hōshi, and it was thought that around this time he changed his surname from Kawate to Ii. At some point of his service within the Ii clan, Kagetaka refused to implement a decree from Imagawa Ujizane as he argued that the decree was not beneficial for the for Ii clan's interests. However, when he was pressured by Sekiguchi Echigo-no-kami Ujitsune (Sekiguchi Naotora's father), to carry out the decree (August 1668, letter from Sekiguchi Ujitsune), Kagetaka reluctantly accepted the decree. However, this incident caused him to be estranged from the Ii clan. At the sametime Iinoya was invaded by Tokugawa Ieyasu, who had just declared his independence from the Imagawa clan, and it was believed that Kagetaka immediately sided with Ieyasu and ended up driving out Naotora from Hikone Castle. Afterwards, Kagetaka did not return to serve Ii Naomasa, although Naomasa began to serve Ieyasu, but his son Yoshinori (Suisuke) served Naomasa. It was believed that by this time he had already reverted to his original surname, Kawate.
- Miwa Mori, a professor of early modern history at Kyoto Women's University, also supported the theory of which released by the institution Ii Museum's statement, which was traced from a record of a written retainer of the Ii clan named Kimata in 1640. Mori stated this source as highly reliable primary source.

Another Japanese historian, Motoki Kuroda from Komazawa University, also supported the theory that Ii Naotora was a son of Sekiguchi Ujitsune. Ujitsune was a vassal of the Imagawa clan who was appointed in Iinoya, Hamamatsu.

Similarly, Daimon Watanabe, a history professor from Bukkyo University, also rejected the supplementary sources of Moriyasu Kō shoki about the female Naotora theory, (Note: a correspondence which dated from 1735, now preserved in Ii's Samurai art Museum.) as he says the scripts were copied from an unverified Edo period book. He supported the theory that Ii Naotora and Jiro-Hoshi were the same people but male, based on the evident confusions of previous historians about the identity. Daimon also added that while a woman could become head of clan in certain situations, it was an extremely rare case, and Naotora was unlikely to be one of them.

Other modern researchers who have similar view with Motoki Kuroda's theory that Naotora is the son of Sekiguchi Ujitsune with childhood name of Jiro Hoshi are Shiba Hiroyuki, Masanori Suzuki, and Yukihiro Kasuya.

=== Female Naotora theory ===
There is only one contemporaneous document related to the person named "Ii Naotora" (井伊直虎) that she is believed to be the same person as Jirō Hōshi (次郎法師), the daughter of Ii Naomori (井伊直盛), who became the head of the Ii family despite being a woman. This theory is based on the "Ii Family Chronicle" (井伊家伝記), written in the mid-Edo period in 1730 (Kyōhō 15). It is said that Jirō Hoshi was engaged to Ii Naochika (井伊直親) but remained unmarried throughout her life and was the foster mother of Naochika's orphaned child, Ii Naomasa (井伊直政), who later became one of Tokugawa's Four Heavenly Kings.

Tetsuo Owada, a professor emeritus of Sengoku history at Shizuoka University who published a book about Naotora has said that this theory of misidentification of Ii Naotora is quite possible, since for generations, many of the heirs of Ii clan usually being called "Jiro", thus the name is suspected as just a pseudonym of various historical figures, although he did not deny the possibility that Ii Naotora was a daughter of Ii Naomori, a leader of Iinoya-is a part of Tōtōmi, who had been defeated by Imagawa Yoshimoto and became a vassal of Imagawa.

According to this theory, as Ii clan had no male heir, so Naotora's great uncle Ii Naomitsu tried to betroth his son Ii Naochika to her so that he could inherit the clan. Unidentified Imagawa clan retainers carried a report of the plans to Imagawa, who ordered Naomitsu and his son Naochika to commit seppuku. Naomitsu died, but Naochika, who was very young, was protected by a Buddhist priest named Nankei. Naochika managed to flee to Shinano. Naotora became a priestess, and was named Jiro-Hoshi aged ten by Nankei. In 1563, Ii Naohira and other men from Ii clan were ordered to break into Hikuma Castle as proof of their loyalty to the Imagawa. Otazu no Kata who was wife of Iio Tsurutatsu (lord of Hikuma castle) invited Naohira to a meeting with her husband and planned to eradicate it to claim prominence in Totomi. On September 18, Otazu no Kata then poisoned Naohira's tea and he died soon after. Following Naohira's death, Jiro Hoshi returned to secular life the male name Naotora and declared herself the nominal head of the Ii clan. It was recorded that Naotora, being a former nun, often acted to avoid battles, earning the respect of many civilians. She was responsible for the development of agriculture and the substantial expansion of the domains of her clan in the region of Enshū.

=== Synthesis theory ===
Michifumi Isoda, professor of International Research Center for Japanese Studies instead offered a synthesis theory which differ from the "Ii clan Biography", that both female Jirō Hōshi and male Ii Naotora both existed as different person, and became head of Ii clan on different occasions. Isoda offered this explanation based on the correspondence material from Seto Hokyu, a samurai under Ii clan, with the Imagawa clan, where the Imagawa recognized Jirō Hōshi as head of Ii clan in September 1568. However, after the Imagawa clan fall and the entrance of Tokugawa clan in the area on December, the name of Ii Naotora emerged as the head of Ii clan, thus Isoda suspected that the Tokugawa clan deposed Jirō Hōshi and installed Naotora as the head of Ii clan instead.

Meanwhile, professor Hirofumi Yamamoto from University of Tokyo giving his chronological concilliatory explanation regarding the letter co-signed by Jiro-Hoshi (daughter of Ii Naomori) and Sekiguchi Naotora (son of Ujitsune) that it indicated while Jiro-Hoshi inherited the Ii clan's surname, the official de facto control of Ii clan's territories including Iinoya castle was run by Naotora, until Ii Naomasa become old enough to inherit the position of Ii clan's leader.

== Biography ==
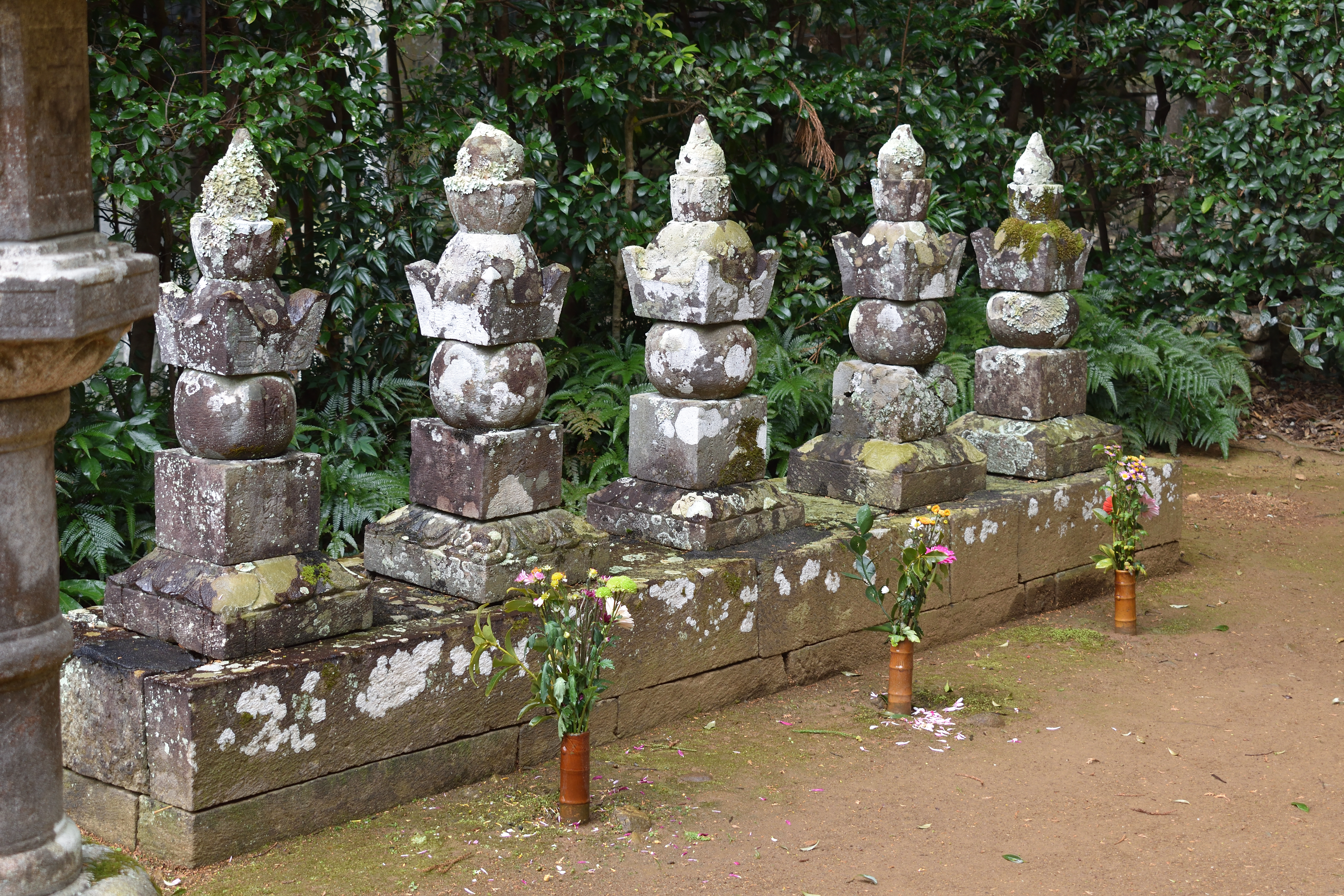
Naotora's grave and other Ii family members.

During the early days of Naotora's reign in 1564, Niino Chikanori, a retainer of Ii clan, besiege the Hikuma castle to prove Naotora's loyalty to Imagawa Ujizane; Otazu and Tsurutatsu fought to defend the castle and Chikanori was killed. Naotora was presumed to have difficulty securing clan leadership because of the innumerable resistances from the Imagawa clan retainers. After numerous threats from Imagawa retainers to the Ii clan, Naotora finally allied with Tokugawa Ieyasu and actively participated in the Tokugawa expansions of the Matsudaira clan in Totomi and Mikawa Provinces.

At the same year, Ono Michiyoshi removed Naotora from leadership of the Iinoya region with the help of former Imagawa's retainers. Naotora escaped to Ryōtan-ji Temple in Hamamatsu, and later sent Naomasa to Ieyasu and sent Naomasa to his care. Later, Michiyoshi was finally captured by the Tokugawa clan and was executed, before his head was disgraced in public.

In December 1568, when Tokugawa Ieyasu invaded Tōtōmi, Naotora's whereabouts became unknown.

=== Death ===
There are several versions regarding the death of Naotora:

- In 1568, according to the Kawate clan record, Naotora was killed in battle while fleeing to Hanazawa Castle in Suruga.
- In 1572, when Takeda Shingen personally invaded Iinoya and other castles in Totomi and Mikawa, Ii Naotora was killed during a clash with the Takeda clan's army.
- In 1582, Naotora died of a disease at Ryōtan-ji temple; the position of Ii clan's head was succeeded by Ii Naomasa.

== In popular culture ==
- Ii Hiroko (born 1965), the eldest daughter of the 17th generation of the Ii clan, authored "Ii-ka no oshie Hikone-han matsuei no musume ga kataru akasonae no seishin" a book of the history of Ii clan.
- In the historical fiction novel Kaname Azusawa, Tokugawa Ieyasu's wife Lady Tsukiyama was from the Imagawa clan and related to Naotora. In this novel, Naotora is portrayed as actively participating in Ieyasu's successful career that would later lead him to become the first shogun of the Tokugawa shogunate.
- Ko Shibasaki portrayed her in the 2017 NHK Taiga drama Naotora: The Lady Warlord (おんな城主 直虎). When she asked about the historical accuracy of Ii Naotora depiction in the series, she added that historical consideration was not the main focus of the drama, since it is mainly focusing on entertainment.
- Ii Naotora appears in the Capcom video games Sengoku Basara 4 and Sengoku Basara: Sanada Yukimura-Den, voiced by Maaya Sakamoto.
- She appears in the Koei Tecmo video games Samurai Warriors 4, Warriors Orochi 4, Dead or Alive 5 Last Round and Warriors All-Stars, voiced by Yuka Saitō in Japanese and Erica Mendez in English (DOA5LR only).
- Ii Naotora is featured in episode 27 of Meow Meow Japanese History, voiced by Yū Kobayashi.

== See also ==
- List of female castellans in Japan
- Onna-musha

== Bibliography ==
- Masanori, Suzuki (2017), 国衆の戦国史 遠江の百年戦争と「地域領主」の興亡 ["The Warring States History of the National Clan: The Hundred Years' War in Totomi and the Rise and Fall of the 'Regional Lords], 歴史新書y (in Japanese), 洋泉社, ISBN 978-4-8003-1218-1
- Kuroda, Motoki (2017). The Truth about Ii Naotora. 角川選書 (in Japanese). KADOKAWA. ISBN 978-4-04-703621-5.
- Shiba, Hiroyuki (2024). "井伊直盛; 直虎―今川家への属に努めた国衆家の当主たち" [Ii Naomori and Ii Naotora; Heads of Provincial Clan who tried to be subordinate to the Imagawa clan]. 戦国武将列伝6 [Sengoku Warlord Biographies 6] (in Japanese). 戎光祥出版. ISBN 978-4-86403-445-6.
  - Yu Ogawa; Shiba Hiroyuki Shiba (eds.). 戦国武将列伝6 東海編 (Sengoku Warlord Biographies 6; Tokai ed.). 戎光祥出版.
- 大石, 泰史 (2016). 井伊氏サバイバル五〇〇年. 星海社新書. 星海社. ISBN 978-4-06-138602-0.
- 井伊達夫 (2016). "井伊直虎に係る新史料公表について 報道 記者会見の経緯". 井伊美術館. Archived from the original on 2016-08-22.
- 黒田, 基樹 (2017). 井伊直虎の真実. 角川選書. Kadokawa Corporation. ISBN 978-4-04-703621-5.
- 森下佳子 (2016). おんな城主 直虎 前編 (NHK大河ドラマ・ストーリー). NHK出版. p. 16.
- 柴, 裕之 (2024), "井伊直盛・直虎―今川家への従属に努めた国衆家の当主たち", in 柴, 裕之; 小川, 雄 (eds.), 戦国武将列伝6 東海編 (in Japanese), 戎光祥出版, ISBN 978-4-86403-445-6
- 鈴木, 将典 (2017), 国衆の戦国史 遠江の百年戦争と「地域領主」の興亡, 歴史新書y (in Japanese), 洋泉社, ISBN 978-4-8003-1218-1
