= Issey Takahashi =

Japanese actor and singer (born 1980)

- 高橋 一生
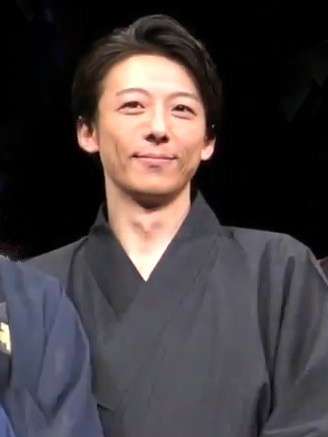
- Takahashi at the screening of Mokkoshi Daimyo! 2019
- Born: December 9, 1980 (age 45); Tokyo, Japan
- Education: Horikoshi High School
- Occupations: Actor; singer
- Years active: 1990–present
- Agent: My Promotion
- Known for: Tami-ō; Whisper of the Heart
- Spouse: Marie Iitoyo (m. 2024)

Issey Takahashi (高橋 一生, Takahashi Issei; born December 9, 1980) is a Japanese actor and singer.

== Early life ==
Takahashi was born in Akasaka, Minato, Tokyo. At the age of 10, he starred in a Dragon Quest IV commercial featuring him as a schoolboy.

== Personal life ==
On May 16, 2024, Takahashi and actress Marie Iitoyo, who is eighteen years younger than him, jointly announced through their respective agencies that they had registered their marriage. The couple revealed that they met on the set of the live-action adaptation of Thus Spoke Rohan Kishibe, in which they had co-starred.

== Filmography ==
=== Film ===
Year	Title	Role	Notes	Ref.
1990	Hoshi wo Tsugu Mono	Shohei Endo		
1991	Only Yesterday	Classmate (voice)		
1995	Whisper of the Heart	Seiji Amasawa (voice)		
1995	Himeyuri no Tō			
1996	Tomoko no Baai	Tokio Okada		
2000	Whiteout	Kenji Amamiya		
2001	All About Lily Chou-Chou	Ikeda-senpai		
2003	Collage of Our Life	Kyohei Sekiguchi		
2003	Kill Bill: Volume 1	Crazy 88 member	American film	
2004	Swing Girls	Sanga High School concert band director		
2004	Kill Bill: The Whole Bloody Affair	Crazy 88 member	American film	
2004	Crying Out Love in the Center of the World	Ryūnosuke Ōki (teenager)		
2004	Half a Confession	Ikegami		
2004	The Taste of Tea	Bucho Igobu		
2006	Love My Life	Take-chan		
2008	Detroit Metal City	Hideki Saji		
2013	Tokyo Sky Story	Koji		
2017	March Comes in like a Lion	Takashi Hayashida		
2017	March Goes out like a Lamb	Takashi Hayashida		
2017	The Limit of Sleeping Beauty	Kaito		
2016	Shin Godzilla	Tatsuhiko Yasuda		
2016	Blank13	Kōji	Lead role	
2018	Recall	Kazuaki Izaki		
2018	The Lies She Loved	Kippei Koide	Lead role	
2018	Million Dollar Man	Tsukumo Furukawa		
2019	Until I Meet September's Love	Susumu Hirano	Lead role	
2019	Samurai Shifters	Gen'emon Takamura		
2019	Romance Doll	Tetsuo	Lead role	
2020	Wife of a Spy	Yūsaku Fukuhara		
2021	Rurouni Kenshin: The Beginning	Katsura Kogorō		
2022	Shin Ultraman	Ultraman (voice)		
2023	Rohan at the Louvre	Rohan Kishibe	Lead role	
2025	Thus Spoke Rohan Kishibe: At a Confessional	Rohan Kishibe	Lead role	
2026	Sunekosuri no Mori	Mysterious man	Lead role	
2026	Rhapsody, Rhapsody	Mikio Natsuno	Lead role	
2027	Ghost	Mass (voice)		
2027	All That Exists	Takahiko Nomoto		

=== Television ===
Year	Title	Role	Notes	Ref.
1990	New York Koi Monogatari II: Otome	Kazunori Togami		
1992	Kyōryū Sentai Zyuranger	Kai	Episodes 47 to 50	
1998	Jiken 6	Yuichi Iwamoto		
1998	Shōnen-tachi	Koichi Sugita		
1999	Genroku Ryōran	Yanagisawa Yoshisato	Taiga drama	
1999	Kowai Dōwa	Yuichi Kimijima		
2000	Ikebukuro West Gate Park	Kazunori Morinaga		
2001	Tales of the Unusual: Fall 2001		Short drama	
2001	Ultraman Cosmos	Mitsuya		
2001	Handoku!!!	Kaze Minamino		
2001	Hero	Shinichi Furuta	Episode 10	
2002	Emergency Room 24hours			
2002	Tax Inspector Madogiwa Taro 8	Yoichi Funatsu	Television film	
2003	Ikebukuro West Gate Park SP	Kazunori Morinaga	Television film	
2004	The Great Horror Family	Kiyoshi Imawano	Lead role	
2004	Shinsengumi!	Matsudaira Sadaaki	Taiga drama	
2005	AIBOU: Tokyo Detective Duo: Season 4	Naotaro Anzai	Episode 4-5	
2006	Wagahai wa Shufu de Aru	Asano		
2006	AIBOU: Tokyo Detective Duo: Season 5	Naotaro Anzai	Episode 5	
2007	Tokkyu Tanaka 3 Go	Ken Mishima		
2007	Iryu: Team Medical Dragon 2	Seiji Toyama		
2007	Fūrin Kazan	Komai Masatake	Taiga drama	
2008	One Pound Gospel	Yusuke Ishizaka		
2008	Gonzo: Densetsu no Keiji	Yuji Hibino		
2010	MM9	Ryo Haida		
2010	Iryu: Team Medical Dragon 3	Seiji Toyama	Episode 9-10	
2010	Bones of Steel	Isao Yamamoto		
2011	Desperate Motherhood	Kenta Akiyama		
2011	Ohisama	Hideo Uehara	Asadora; week 13	
2011	Odd Family 11	Kensuke Toyama	Episode 6-7	
2012	Delusional Investigation - A Stylish Life of Associate Professor Koichi Kuwagara	Yasuo Yamauchi	Episode 6	
2012	Becoming Mrs. Hayami	Akihiko Toritani	Episode 8-9	
2012	Hitorishizuka	Shingo Kizaki	Episode 1	
2012	Mi Wo Tsukushi Ryoricho	Mataji	Television film	
2012	W no Higeki	Shohei Masaki		
2012	Naniwa Junior Detectives	Hiro Yamashita	Episode 6	
2013	Gekiryu: Watashi wo Oboete Imasuka?	Kenji Akiyoshi		
2013	Woman: My Life for My Children	Yugo Sawamura		
2014	Gunshi Kanbei	Inoue Kurouemon	Taiga drama	
2014	Nobunaga Concerto	Azai Nagamasa	Episode 5-10	
2014	Night Teacher	Ichiro Yamada		
2014	Mosaic Japan	Yoshiaki Kui		
2014	Funeral Procession of Peter	Masahiko Hashimoto		
2015	Dakara Koya	Shogo Kameda		
2015	Dr. Rintaro, Psychiatrist	Daisaku Fukuhara		
2015	Wise and Foolish	Mohei Kaibara		
2016	Love That Makes You Cry	Joji Sabiki		
2016	My Dangerous Wife	Kazuki Kujirai		
2016	The Prime Minister's Chef	Haruki Kiyosawa		
2016	Princess Maison	Masaichi Date		
2016	Wise and Foolish: Aratanaru Inbou	Mohei Kaibara	Television film	
2016	Wise and Foolish: Koisuru Sousaisen	Mohei Kaibara	Lead role; television film	
2016	Ōedo Enjō	Hoshina Masayuki	Lead role	
2016	My Long Awaited Love Story	Soichirou Kurosawa	Lead role; television film	
2017	Naotora: The Lady Warlord	Ono Masatsugu	Taiga drama	
2017	Quartet	Yutaka Iemori	Lead role	
2017	The Public Enemy	Makoto Todo		
2017	Laugh It Up!	Shiori Inō	Asadora	
2018	Miracles	Kazuki Aikawa	Lead role	
2019	Crescent Moon	Goro Oshima	Lead role	
2019	Tokyo Bachelors	Taro Ishibashi	Lead role	
2019	Nagi's Long Vacation	Shinji Gamon		
2020	Wife of a Spy	Yūsaku Fukuhara	Television film	
2020	Path of the Dragons	Ryuji Yabat a		
2020–24	Thus Spoke Kishibe Rohan	Rohan Kishibe	Lead role; 9 episodes	
2021	Heaven and Hell: Soul Exchange	Haruto Hidaka		
2022	Snow Country	Shimamura	Lead role; television film	
2022	Invisible	Takafumi Shimura	Lead role	
2022	The Aromantics	Satoru Takahashi	Lead role	
2023	Six-Second Path: The Melancholy of Fireworks Master Seitaro Mochizuki	Mochizuki Seitaro	Lead role	
2025	Zero Day	Isamu Fujiwara	Taiwanese drama	
2025	1972: Nagisa no Keika	Taichi Maeda	Lead role; miniseries	
2026	Izumi Kyoka wa Damaranai	Rohan Kishibe	Television film	
2026	Reborn	Kosei Neo / Eito	Lead role	
2026	Criminal	Soma	Lead role	
2026	Politica Lupin	Masakado Natsume		

=== Japanese dub ===
Live-action

Year	Title	Role	Voice dub for	Notes	Ref.
2018	Legend of the Demon Cat	Bai Letian	Huang Xuan		

Animation

Year	Title	Role	Notes	Ref.
2019	Moominvalley	Snufkin		

== Awards and nominations ==
Year	Award	Category	Work(s)	Result	Ref.
2017	7th Confidence Award Drama Prizes	Best Supporting Actor	Quartet	Won	
2018	The 42nd Elan d'or Awards	Newcomer of the Year	Himself	Won	
2018	The 31st Nikkan Sports Film Awards	Best Supporting Actor	Recall, The Lies She Loved, Blank13, and Million Dollar Man	Won	
2021	75th Mainichi Film Awards	Best Actor	Wife of a Spy	Nominated	
