= Ono Michiyoshi =

Ono Michiyoshi (小野 道好, ? - May 3, 1569) was a Japanese samurai of the Sengoku period. He served in the Imagawa clan and Ii clan. He was the son of Ono Masanao.

== Life ==
Michiyoshi was born in Tōtōmi. His father (Masanao) was Ii's vassal. He had secret communications with Imagawa Yoshimoto. When Ii Naomitsu planned to rebel against Imagawa, Masanao secretly informed Imagawa and Naomitsu was killed. About ten years later, Masanao got sick and died. After that, a son of Naomitsu (Ii Naochika) returned from Shinano to Iinoya and inherited Ii clan. Michiyoshi had to serve Naochika, although they were on bad terms. When Ii Naochika planned a rebellion against Imagawa Ujizane, Michiyoshi secretly passed information to Imagawa, so Naochika was killed by Asahina clan (lords of Kakegawa castle and servants of the Imagawa clan). After that, he occupied Iinoya and tried to kill Naochika's son (Ii Naomasa). He fought against Ii Naotora (Naomasa's adopted mother ) and Tokugawa Ieyasu. He was defeated in 1569. He was beheaded by Tokugawa Ieyasu's order, and his head was disgraced in public.
