= Thus Spoke Rohan Kishibe =

Japanese one-shot manga series

- Volume 1 cover, featuring Rohan Kishibe

岸辺露伴は動かない (Kishibe Rohan wa Ugokanai)
- Genre: Horror
- Manga
- Written by: Hirohiko Araki
- Published by: Shueisha
- English publisher: NA: NBM Publishing; Viz Media
- Imprint: Jump Comics
- Magazine: Weekly Shōnen Jump; Jump Square; Shōnen Jump+; Bessatsu Margaret; JoJo Magazine; Ultra Jump
- Original run: July 7, 1997 – present
- Volumes: 3 + extra
- Light novel
- Written by: Ballad Kitaguni; Ryo Yoshigami; Yusuke Iba; Mirei Miyamoto; Katsuie Shibata
- Illustrated by: Hirohiko Araki
- Published by: Shueisha
- Magazine: Ultra Jump
- Original run: July 19, 2017 – April 19, 2024
- Volumes: 4
- Original video animation
- Directed by: Toshiyuki Kato; Assistant director: Yasufumi Soejima
- Produced by: Hiroyuki Oomori; Jun Fukuda; Ryosuke Mori; Toshiyasu Hayashi
- Written by: Toshiyuki Kato
- Music by: Yugo Kanno
- Studio: David Production
- Licensed by: Netflix (streaming); NA: Viz Media (home video)
- Released: 2017 – March 25, 2020
- Episodes: 4
- Television drama
- Directed by: Kazutaka Watanabe
- Produced by: Takayasu Suzuki; Keisuke Dobashi; Daisuke Hiraga
- Written by: Yasuko Kobayashi
- Music by: Naruyoshi Kikuchi
- Studio: NHK Enterprises
- Original network: NHK General TV
- Original run: December 28, 2020 – present
- Episodes: 9 + 2 films + 2 specials
- icon

Thus Spoke Rohan Kishibe (Japanese: 岸辺露伴は動かない, Hepburn: Kishibe Rohan wa Ugokanai; lit. 'Rohan Kishibe Does Not Move') is a series of manga one-shots created by Hirohiko Araki. It is a spin-off from Diamond Is Unbreakable, the fourth part of Araki's JoJo's Bizarre Adventure series, and features the character Rohan Kishibe, a manga artist who travels around the world to get inspiration from people's lives. The English title of the series is a reference to the book Thus Spoke Zarathustra by Friedrich Nietzsche.

The series is published by Shueisha, starting with the one-shot "Episode 16: At a Confessional" in 1997 in their Weekly Shōnen Jump; new episodes have since appeared in their Jump Square, Shōnen Jump+, Bessatsu Margaret, JoJo Magazine, and Ultra Jump magazines. The series was originally meant to be completely original, but it was changed as Araki found it too tempting to use Rohan. The first collected volume was released in 2013. The first volume was the 68th best-selling manga volume of 2014 in Japan and was well received by critics.

Spin-off short stories by several writers were published from 2017 to 2024. Original video animation (OVA) adaptations were released by David Production from 2017 to 2020. A live-action adaptation premiered on NHK General TV in 2020.

== Synopsis ==
The series follows the character Rohan Kishibe, a famous manga artist who wants to give his works more realism, and therefore travels around the world to draw inspiration from people's lives. He does this by using his Stand — a manifestation of his life energy — named "Heaven's Door", which he uses to read and write in a person, allowing him to learn everything about them and alter their memories and behaviors.

== Production and publication ==
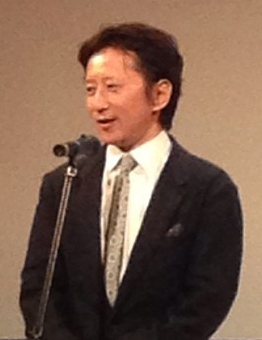
The series is created by Hirohiko Araki.

Thus Spoke Rohan Kishibe is created by Hirohiko Araki in an episodic format. It began with "Episode 16: At a Confessional", which was published by Shueisha on July 7, 1997, in Weekly Shōnen Jump #30/1997. He was asked to contribute a one-shot for the magazine by the editorial staff, with two requirements; it had to be shorter than 45 pages, and could not be a spin-off or side story. However, he created a spin-off featuring the JoJo's Bizarre Adventure character Rohan Kishibe. Araki speculated that had he not been forbidden from making one, he probably would not have created a spin-off with Rohan, and for that he is grateful. He also said that he created a version of the story without the Diamond Is Unbreakable character, but found it much better with Rohan's commentary. For later episodes, the series switched back and forth between different Shueisha publications, with new episodes appearing in Weekly Shōnen Jump, Jump Square, Shōnen Jump+, Bessatsu Margaret, JoJo Magazine, and Ultra Jump. "The Harvest Moon", the episode from the web magazine Shōnen Jump+, was part of the publication's launch line-up and was made available to read for free. Looking back on them, Araki found each story to have a distinct "flavor" and influence depending on where it was published and noted this was not a conscious decision on his part. He used to read the shōjo manga magazine Bessatsu Margaret at the house of a female relative when he was a kid. As such, he speculated that might be why "Deoxyribonucleic Acid" has an emotional, happy ending instead of a scary one like he typically uses. The characters Tonio Trussardi and Yukako Yamagishi from Diamond Is Unbreakable appear in "Poaching Seashore" and "Deoxyribonucleic Acid", respectively. Araki said the Mochizuki family in "The Harvest Moon" is reminiscent of the Higashikata family from JoJolion. For "The Run", Araki said he revived the muscular character style he used for JoJo's Bizarre Adventure in the 1980s.

In 2009, Araki's was one of five artists featured in the Louvre's Le Louvre invite la bande dessinée ("The Louvre Invites Comic-Strip Art") exhibition for his artwork of JoJo's Bizarre Adventure. To commemorate this honor, he wrote Rohan at the Louvre, a 123-page full color story starring Rohan Kishibe visiting the Louvre and discovering a cursed painting tied to his family. The following year it was published in France and ran in Ultra Jump, and in May 2011 the one-shot was released as a standalone hardcover publication. Rohan at the Louvre was slated to be translated and released in North America by NBM Publishing in February 2012, but eventually released in April of the same year instead.

From September 17 to October 6, 2011, the Gucci store in Shinjuku hosted the "Gucci x Hirohiko Araki x Spur 'Rohan Kishibe Goes to Gucci' Exhibition", a collaboration between the luxury Italian clothing brand, Araki, and the Japanese fashion magazine Spur. The exhibit celebrated the 90th anniversary of Gucci and featured a life-size figure of Rohan Kishibe, as well as numerous illustrations by Araki that included actual pieces of the brand's own 2011–2012 fall/winter collection and his own original fashion designs. The October 2011 issue of the Japanese fashion magazine Spur featured another one-shot manga titled "Rohan Kishibe Goes to Gucci", in which Rohan goes to a Gucci factory to discover the secret behind a magical handbag.

A collected volume of one-shots by Araki, titled Under Execution Under Jailbreak, was released in 1999 in Japan, containing "At a Confessional" along with three other stories. A collected Thus Spoke Rohan Kishibe volume was later released in Japan on November 19, 2013, containing the first four episodes, along with "Rohan Kishibe Meets Gucci." A second volume containing the next four episodes was released in Japan on July 19, 2018. In February 2022, Viz Media announced they licensed the series for English publication under the title Thus Spoke Rohan Kishibe, with the first volume released on September 27, 2022. The first volume was also published by Star Comics in Italy on January 8, 2015, as Così parlò Rohan Kishibe, and by Tonkam in France in April 2016 as Rohan Kishibe.

== Chapters ==
The magazine and date of original publication are listed beside the title of each chapter.

No.	Original release date	Original ISBN	English release date	English ISBN
N/A	May 27, 2011 (Note: Rohan at the Louvre was originally released in France on April 9, 2010.)	978-4-08-782379-0	April 1, 2012	978-1-5616-3615-0
Rohan at the Louvre (岸辺露伴 ルーヴルへ行く, Kishibe Rohan Rūvuru e Iku; lit. "Rohan Kishibe Goes to the Louvre") (Ultra Jump, March 19, 2010 – May 19, 2010)
1	November 19, 2013	978-4-08-870872-0	September 27, 2022	978-1-9747-3074-2
"Episode 16: At a Confessional" (懺悔室, Zange-shitsu; lit. "The Confessional Room") (Weekly Shōnen Jump, July 7, 1997); "Episode 2: Mutsu-kabe Hill" (六壁坂, Mutsukabe-zaka) (Jump Square, January 2008); "Episode 5: Millionaire Village" (富豪村, Fugō-mura) (Weekly Shōnen Jump, November 22, 2012); "Episode 6: Poaching Seashore" (密漁海岸, Mitsuryō Kaigan) (Weekly Shōnen Jump, October 28, 2013); "Rohan Kishibe Goes to Gucci" (岸辺露伴 グッチへ行く, Kishibe Rohan Gucchi e Iku) (Spur, August 23, 2011) (Note: This chapter is not included in the English edition.)
2	July 19, 2018	978-4-08-908314-7	December 27, 2022	978-1-9747-3409-2
"Episode 4: The Harvest Moon" (望月家のお月見, Mochizuki-ke no Otsukimi; lit. "Mochizuki Family Moon Viewing") (Shōnen Jump+, September 22, 2014); "Episode 7: A Rainy Monday" (月曜日 天気-雨, Getsuyōbi Tenki - Ame; lit. "Monday's Weather: Rain") (Note: In the original magazine edition, the title of the chapter is spelled as Getsuyōbi - Tenkiame (月曜日-天気雨; lit. "Monday: Rainy Weather").) (Jump Square, December 4, 2015); "Episode 8: Deoxyribonucleic Acid" (D・N・A, Dī Enu Ē) (Note: In the original magazine edition, this chapter was labeled "Episode 9.") (Bessatsu Margaret, August 12, 2017); "Episode 9: The Run" (ザ・ラン, Za Ran) (Note: In the original magazine edition, this chapter was labeled "Episode 10.") (Weekly Shōnen Jump, February 26, 2018)
3	May 19, 2025	978-4-08-884548-7	July 7, 2026	978-1-9747-6584-3
"Episode 10: Hot Summer Martha" (ホットサマー・マーサ, Hotto Samā Māsa) (JoJo Magazine, March 19, 2022); "Episode 11: Dripping" (ドリッピング画法, Dorippingu Gahō) (Ultra Jump, April 19, 2022 – May 19, 2022); "Episode 12: Bruschetta" (ブルスケッタ, Burusuketta) (Ultra Jump, April 18, 2025)

== Light novels ==
Spin-off short stories by the writers Ballad Kitaguni, Ryo Yoshigami, Yusuke Iba, Mirei Miyamoto and Katsuie Shibata, illustrated by Araki, were published in the Appendix Booklet of Ultra Jump magazine from 2017 to 2024. In 2018, they were compiled into two volumes: Rohan Kishibe Does Not Shout and Rohan Kishibe Does Not Frolic. Another volume, Rohan Kishibe Does Not Fall, was released in 2022, and the fourth one, Rohan Kishibe Does Not Laugh, in 2024. Each volume included an additional original story, with the fourth one having two.

== Original video animation ==
An original video animation (OVA) adaptation of "Episode 5: Millionaire Village" was produced by the animation studio David Production, with direction by Toshiyuki Kato, direction assistance by Yasufumi Soejima, character design by Shun'ichi Ishimoto, and Stand design by Kenta Mimuro. The opening theme, "Kishibe Rohan wa Ugokanai no Tema", is performed by Yuugo Kanno, while the ending theme, "Finding the Truth", is performed by Coda. The OVA was distributed on DVD in 2017 to people who had purchased all thirteen Japanese DVD or Blu-ray volumes of the 2016 television anime series JoJo's Bizarre Adventure: Diamond Is Unbreakable before July 31, 2017. Kato made use of different coloring compared to the Diamond Is Unbreakable anime, to capture the feeling of horror in the manga, and directed the opening sequence to simultaneously give off a feeling of nostalgia and unease, referencing television shows like The Twilight Zone (1959) and Twin Peaks (1990). A second OVA episode by the same studio and staff, adapting "Episode 2: Mutsu-kabe Hill", was released on DVD on July 19, 2018, in a bundle with pre-orders of the limited edition of the second manga volume. A single containing the opening and ending themes was released on the same day as the second OVA episode. Two new OVA episodes, adapting "Episode 16: At a Confessional" and "Episode 9: The Run", were screened theatrically in nine cities in Japan starting on December 8, 2019, and were released on DVD and Blu-Ray on March 25, 2020.

At the Netflix Anime Festival in late October 2020, the company acquired streaming rights to the OVAs for a 2021 release. In January 2021, Netflix announced that it would premiere on February 18. Viz Media released the OVAs on Blu-ray in the U.S. on July 18, 2023.

=== Voice cast ===
Character	Japanese	English
Rohan Kishibe	Takahiro Sakurai	Landon McDonald
Koichi Hirose	Yuki Kaji	Zach Aguilar
Okuyasu Nijimura	Wataru Takagi	Jalen K. Cassell
Kyoka Izumi (OVA 1)	Mai Nakahara	Brittany Cox
Ikkyu (OVA 1)	Kaori Mizuhashi	Jessica DiCicco
Naoko Osato (OVA 2)	Atsumi Tanezaki	Suzie Yeung
Gunpei Kamafusa (OVA 2)	Junji Majima	Stephen Fu
Minoru Kaigamori (OVA 2)	Takamasa Mogi	Howard Wang
Tamami Kobayashi (OVA 2)	Satoshi Tsuruoka	Frank Todaro
Akira Otoishi (OVA 2)	Showtaro Morikubo	Andrew Russell
Mikitaka Hazekura (OVA 2)	Yasuyuki Kase	Mark Whitten
Shuichi (OVA 2)	Takeaki Masuyama	Mark Whitten
Naoko's Daughter (OVA 2)	Yūki Takada	Faye Mata
Batsudera (OVA 2)	TBA	Frank Todaro
Young Man (OVA 3)	Hiroki Takahashi	Crispin Freeman
Confessor (OVA 3)	Naoya Nosaka	Crispin Freeman
Vagrant (OVA 3)	Shoto Kashii	Mark Whitten
Young Man's Daughter (OVA 3)	Hina Kino	Skyler Davenport
Demon Spirit (OVA 3)	Shoto Kashii	Bob Carter
Yukako Yamagishi (OVA 3)	Mamiko Noto	Faye Mata
Yoma Hashimoto (OVA 4)	Koki Uchiyama	Aleks Le
Mika Hayamura (OVA 4)	Chinatsu Akasaki	Skyler Davenport
Personal Trainer (OVA 4)	Ryota Takeuchi	Kane Jangbluth-Murry
Gym Staff Member (OVA 4)	Satoru Murakami	Andrew Russell
Talent Scout (OVA 4)	Saori Terai	Faye Mata

=== Episodes ===
No.	Title	Original release date
OVA–1	"Episode 5: Millionaire Village" "Episōdo #05: Fugō-mura" (エピソード#05 富豪村)	2017
Rohan's editor, Kyoka Izumi, persuades him to accompany her to the exclusive and secluded Millionaire Village. She intends to buy a vacation villa and warns him that the residents are very particular about manners. Outside the village, the pair pick up a lost baby bird and then meet a doorman, Ikkyu. He soon claims they have already broken three strict rules and Kyoka begs for another chance. She then receives word that her mother and boyfriend have died in a car accident, while Rohan discovers the baby bird they rescued is dead. Using Heaven's Door on Ikkyu, Rohan discovers that the mountain gods reward those who follow correct manners while punishing those who do not by taking something precious away from them. By using his Stand, Rohan commits another violation, which causes Kyoka to have a heart attack. Rohan is then tasked with eating corn on the cob correctly to save her, but he sees through Ikkyu's set-up and passes the test. Meanwhile, Rohan simultaneously tricks Ikkyu into repeatedly breaching his own rules of etiquette, saving Kyoka and her loved ones.
OVA–2	"Episode 2: Mutsu-kabe Hill" "Episōdo #02: Mutsukabe-zaka" (エピソード#02 六壁坂)	July 19, 2018
Rohan asks his manga editor, Minoru Kaigamori, for an advance. To explain why he spent all his money buying forested mountains, Rohan tells him a story which took place at Mutsu-kabe Hill. Naoko Osato, the daughter of a wealthy family, accidentally killed her lover, the gardener Gunpei, after shoving him onto some golf clubs. Gunpei's body mysteriously continued to bleed from his head wound following his death, so she hid his body in the house. Daily, she disposed of the blood which flowed from his wound, even years after marrying her fiancé. Sometime later, Rohan encountered a girl in the area who accidentally tripped in front of him, fatally striking her head which began to bleed. Quickly using his Heaven's Door ability to rewrite her past, he saved her and learned that she was the child of Naoko and Gunpei, born after his death. He realized that she was possessed by a Yōkai that propagates itself through descendants, but decided to leave the family alone and let them have their own form of happiness. Rohan then used the experience as inspiration for his manga.
OVA–3	"Episode 16: At a Confessional" "Episōdo #16: Zange-shitsu" (エピソード#16 懺悔室)	December 8, 2019
Rohan tells Koichi about the time he went to Venice, and entered a confessional. While inside, a man told him about his youth as a laborer where he had a beggar carry heavy bags of corn, which lead to his death. Afterwards, the beggar vowed he would take his revenge. The man's life then took a fortunate turn, and he became successful. Just when he was at his happiest, the spirit of the beggar took possession of his daughter. The spirit offered him a chance to redeem himself if he could throw a piece of popcorn in the air higher than a nearby lamppost and catch it in his mouth, three times in a row. If he succeeded the spirit would leave him forever, otherwise, he would cut off his head. He succeeded twice, but missed the third time and the spirit immediately cut off his head. While Rohan was wondering how the man could still be alive, the man's servant dragged himself into the church carrying his head, followed by the beggar. Venting his wrath at being duped, the servant and also the beggar vow to stalk him until his daughter is happiest, and then take their revenge.
OVA–4	"Episode 9: The Run" "Episōdo #09: Za Ran" (エピソード#09 ザ・ラン)	December 8, 2019
Yoma Hashimoto is recruited as a male model, and becomes quite successful, but also narcissistic and obsessed about his body shape. He encounters Rohan at the gym and after competing against him, becomes even more obsessive. Eventually, he steals money from his girlfriend Mika to buy more equipment and she throws him out. At the gym, Rohan challenges Yoma to a contest on two treadmills in which the first to reach 25 km/h can grab the remote control and stop their machine. Rohan beats Yoma, who demands a rematch. This time, Yoma intimidates Rohan, and when he tries to grab the remote early, Yoma breaks three of Rohan’s fingers. He also smashes the window behind them so the loser will be propelled through it. Rohan uses Heaven's Door and discovers that Yoma has killed anyone who interferes with his training. Yoma wins the contest, but Rohan had written on Yoma's hand that he would stop Rohan's treadmill instead of his own, so it is Yoma who is sent flying. Rohan regrets that he crossed the line by angering Yoma, who had become the avatar of the god of speed Hermes, and decides to run for his life.

== Live action ==
NHK announced on October 13, 2020 that it was producing a three-episode live-action mini-series adaptation of Thus Spoke Rohan Kishibe. The adaptation, which included two stories from the manga ("Millionaire Village" and "Deoxyribonucleic Acid") and one story from the short story collection ("Kushagara"), aired on NHK General TV and NHK BS4K on December 28 through December 30. On August 15, 2021, NHK announced that a second season the series would be aired from December 27 through the 29th. The second season consisted of three episodes, with two based on stories from the Rohan Kishibe manga ("The Run" and "Mutsu-kabe Hill") and one adapting the "Cheap Trick" story arc from Diamond Is Unbreakable ("From Behind"). On August 20, 2022, NHK announced a third season to begin airing on December 26. The third season adapts one story from the Rohan Kishibe manga ("Hot Summer Martha") and the "Rosham Boy Is Here!" story arc from Diamond Is Unbreakable ("Rock-Paper-Scissors Boy").

On January 4, 2023, it was announced that the series would receive a live-action film on May 26. The film was titled Rohan at the Louvre, based on the manga story of the same name. The cast and staff from the series returned for the film. On April 1, 2024, NHK announced that a fourth season would premiere on May 5. This fourth season consisted of a single episode adapting the "Poaching Seashore" story from the manga, with elements taken from the "Let's Go Eat Some Italian Food" arc in Diamond Is Unbreakable. A short special episode was released exclusively on Amazon Prime Video on May 18, depicting a conversation between the characters Kyoka Izumi and Hatsune Morishima.

On January 6, 2025, the series's second live-action film, Thus Spoke Kishibe Rohan: At a Confessional, was announced. The film, based on the titular story from the manga, premiered on May 23. A special episode centered around the character Kyoka Izumi was announced on March 3, 2026 and premiered on May 4.

=== Series cast ===
Character	Actor
Rohan Kishibe	Issey Takahashi
Kyoka Izumi	Marie Iitoyo
Taro Hirai	Tomoya Nakamura
Ikkyu (Episode 1)	Fūga Shibasaki
Jugo Shishi (Episode 2)	Mirai Moriyama
Mai Katahira (Episode 3)	Kumi Takiuchi
Akira Katahira (Episode 3)	Eita Okuro
Mao Katahira (Episode 3)	Yuria Kitahira
Yoma Hashimoto (Episode 4)	Show Kasamatsu
Mika Hayamura (Episode 4)	Maria
Masazo Kinoto (Episode 5)	Ichikawa Ennosuke IV
Naoko Osato (Episode 6)	Rio Uchida
Gunpei Kamafusa (Episode 6)	Daichi Watanabe
Kai Osato (Episode 6)	Sosuke Yoshida
Kiriko Osato (Episode 6)	Tamaki Shiratori
Eve (Episode 7)	Kotone Furukawa
Ken Oyanagi (Episode 8)	Hinata Hiiragi
Tonio Trussardi (Episode 9)	Alfredo Chiarenza
Hatsune Morishima (Episode 9 and Special 1)	Misako Renbutsu
Kansuke (Special 2)	Atsushi Hashimoto
Mika Saion (Special 2)	Mayu Hotta
Soshi Saion (Special 2)	Kanichiro

=== Film cast ===
Character	Actor
Rohan Kishibe/Nizaemon Yamamura	Issey Takahashi; Kento Nagao (Rohan, Young)
Kyoka Izumi	Marie Iitoyo
Nanase (Film 1)	Fumino Kimura
Rohan's Grandmother (Film 1)	Kayoko Shiraishi
Gaucher Bigotte (Film 1)	Meddy
Emma Noguchi (Film 1)	Minami
Ryunosuke Tatsumi (Film 1)	Masanobu Ando
Jacques Blanc (Film 1)	Philippe Mamolo
Nicolas Thomas (Film 1)	Jean-Christophe Loustau
Hugo Renard (Film 1)	Robin Bard
Maurice Legrand (Film 1)	Arno Le Gall
Maria (Film 2)	Tina Tamashiro; Dalia M. (Young)
Mizuo (Film 2)	Arata Iura
Sotoba (Film 2)	Shigeyuki Totsugi
Tamiya (Film 2)	Shunsuke Daito
Lorenzo Grimani (Film 2)	Andrewa Bellacicco

=== Episodes ===
No.	Title	Original release date
1	"Millionaire Village" "Fugō-mura" (富豪村)	December 28, 2020
Rohan's newest editor, Kyoka Izumi, hears from her amnesiac boyfriend Taro about a village rumored to make its residents rich. After much persuasion, Rohan agrees to accompany her to the village, where they meet with the village's butler, Ikkyu. Shortly after breaching manners twice, Izumi is informed via phone call that Taro and her dog Maron have been struck by a vehicle and are presumed dead. Rohan silences Izumi and investigates Ikkyu with Heaven's Door, learning that the village is owned by the gods of the mountain, who steal precious things from those who violate manners. As Rohan's investigation itself violates manners, he loses use of his right arm. Nonetheless, Rohan commands Ikkyu to subconciously violate manners himself, voiding the trial, returning Rohan's arm to him, and reviving Taro and Maron. Rohan and Izumi leave the village afterward, the latter believing she was simply turned down for her bad manners. Rohan decides not to use the village as material for his work, for fear of endangering his readers.
2	"Kushagara" "Kushagara" (くしゃがら)	December 29, 2020
Rohan meets fellow manga artist Jugo Shishi at a café. Jugo shows Rohan a list of "forbidden words" his editor sent him shortly before his mysterious disappearance, which includes the unknown word "kushagara." Intrigued, Rohan decides to look into "kushagara" further, while Izumi seeks out Jugo's editor. Later, at a bookstore, Rohan sees Jugo harassing the shopkeeper for information and drags him back to his apartment, noting his new aggression and tic of incorporating the word "kushagara" into his sentences. Izumi reunites with Rohan at his house, having learned that Jugo's editor gave Jugo the list in order to free himself of the obsession Jugo now suffers from. At that moment, Jugo bursts in, forcing Rohan to render him unconscious with Heaven's Door. While looking through Jugo's pages, Rohan notices a black pouch repeating the word aloud and realizes the word "kushagara" is forbidden by reality itself. He quickly orders Jugo to forget all recent events, curing him of his delirium; shortly afterward, he does the same to the bookstore clerk. Nevertheless, Rohan is haunted by the idea that he may suffer the same fate someday.
3	"D.N.A." "Dī Enu Ei" (D・N・A)	December 30, 2020
Believing Rohan's treatment of Jugo to have been hypnosis, Kyoka suggests he use it to restore Taro's memories. As the three of them meet, a passing child named Mao Katahira grabs Taro, causing him to fall and be injured. At the hospital, Mao's mother, Mai, apologizes to the three, claiming incidents follow wherever her child goes. She further explains that her husband died in an automobile accident before Mao was born. Rohan takes enough of an interest to follow her and Mao home, but further investigation reveals nothing is biologically wrong with Mao. However, Mao turns invisible and leaves the house, a power Rohan blames on Mai's overbearing parenting. Mao catches up to Taro at a park, where Rohan narrowly saves both of them from being hit by a passing vehicle. Using Heaven's Door, Rohan discovers that Mai's husband's organs were transplanted to save Taro's life in a separate accident, altering his DNA and causing his amnesia. Afterward, Taro breaks up with Izumi to be with his organ donor's family.
4	"The Run" "Za Ran" (ザ・ラン)	December 27, 2021
At his usual gym, Rohan meets an amateur model named Yoma Hashimoto, who he challenges to a treadmill race and narrowly wins against. Unbeknownst to Rohan, Yoma had already begun developing a fixation with fitness, going so far as to run through a mountain trail every night. A few days later, Rohan finds the gym still open past closing time. Inside, he finds Yoma, who dares Rohan to a rematch. Yoma then smashes the window behind the treadmills to raise the stakes, compelling Rohan to investigate him with Heaven's Door. Rohan finds that Yoma has developed a killing streak, silently eliminating anyone who interferes with his fitness routine. Reluctantly, Rohan decides to continue the rematch, but narrowly loses to Yoma. However, Rohan orders Yoma to stop the other treadmill instead of his own, sending him flying through the window. Fearful that Yoma may have survived the fall, Rohan decides to run from the spot. Nonetheless, he links Yoma's condition to the mountain trail, which passes through a spot called "Mutsu-kabe Hill," and decides to purchase the whole mountain range.
5	"From Behind" "Senaka no Shōmen" (背中の正面)	December 28, 2021
After hearing Rohan's story, Izumi decides to look into similar stories on his behalf, and eventually comes across an alley called "Hirasaka" rumored to spirit away those who look behind them. Meanwhile, Rohan meets with a real estate agent named Masazo Kinoto, who represents a resort company with its own interests in the mountain range. Noticing that Kinoto will bend over backwards (in the literal sense) to make sure his back remains unseen, Rohan decides to trick him into revealing it in a hidden mirror. Although his back seems normal, Kinoto suddenly collapses to the floor, lifeless. After the agent is picked up by paramedics, Rohan is confronted by a creature assuming Kinoto's form and clinging to his back. He immediately understands that he is possessed by a yōkai, and that the same yōkai possessed Kinoto at "Mutsu-kabe Hill" with the aim of reclaiming ownership of the land. Unable to sleep, Rohan completes his manuscript overnight and sets out in the morning. However, his destination is revealed to be the "Hirasaka" alley, where he reunites with Izumi. Rohan forces the yōkai to turn toward her, causing it to be taken away by the alley's spirits without harming him.
6	"Mutsu-kabe Hill" "Mutsukabe-zaka" (六壁坂)	December 29, 2021
Rohan and Izumi travel to Mutsu-kabe Village, where they meet a fan of Rohan's named Kai Osato. Rohan goes off on his own to speak with the boy's mother, Naoto Osato, who is also the village's prior landowner. Investigating Naoto for clues toward "Mutsu-kabe Hill," Rohan finds out that she accidentally murdered her secret lover several years ago, only to find that his body never stopped bleeding. According to her, the body is still in her attic, and briefly regains its living form if exposed to moisture. Quickly diagnosing the man as another yōkai, Rohan determines that "Mutsu-kabe Hill" is located close to the Osato house, and had been disturbed by the family's occupation of it. Upon reaching "Mutsu-kabe Hill," Rohan meets Naoto's other child, Kiriko Osato, who suffers a fatal fall in front of him. He realizes that she is another yōkai born from Naoto's affair with her lover's "corpse," and that the girl means to possess him through his sympathy. Rohan orders Kiriko not to notice his presence, saving both of their lives. Despite his fears about Naoto's other child, Kai shows no intent to die or possess Izumi by the time Rohan reaches them. Rohan decides to leave the yōkai be, and he and Izumi return home.
7	"Hot Summer Martha" "Hotto Samā Māsā" (ホットサマー・マーサ)	December 26, 2022
Stressed by the COVID-19 pandemic and Izumi's criticism of his new character Hot Summer Martha's three-circle design, Rohan decides to go for a walk outside. After reaching a crossroads, he finds himself guided toward a shrine, where he unknowingly swaps places with a yōkai known as Yabubako-Hoshi for three months after opening its cave and peering inside. After returning home, Rohan thus finds that a fourth circle has been added to Hot Summer Martha's design, and that a stalker named Eve has carried on a relationship with his other self. Desperate to undo the change to Hot Summer Martha, Rohan hurries back to the shrine, where the priests in charge of it explain that Rohan was led there by Tsujigami, another yōkai which dwells at crossroads. The priests also advise him to turn the mirror within the shrine without being reflected in it to revert Yabubako-Hoshi's actions. Rohan attempts to do so, and only realizes he failed after returning home. There, Rohan is confronted by Eve, who has become pregnant with his child and injected Izumi with a lethal drug out of jealousy. Thinking quickly, Rohan uses Heaven's Door to order Eve to go to the shrine and turn the mirror in his place, with a further condition to not commit any crimes from then on. Izumi is saved, but Hot Summer Martha's design is not reverted, the change having been Izumi's decision all along.
8	"Rock-Paper-Scissors Boy" "Janken Kozō" (ジャンケン小僧)	December 27, 2022
A fan of Rohan's named Ken Oyanagi visits his house to complain about Hot Summer Martha's design, as the arc it features in had recently been printed in a volume. Rohan dismisses the boy, despite agreeing with him. Frustrated by Rohan's apparent lack of respect for him and the number three, Ken wanders into a crossroads, where Tsujigami gifts him the power to steal the vitality of others by winning against them in rock-paper-scissors. Ken begins getting in Rohan's way to demand he play against him; despite winning the first two games, Rohan loses the third time when he plays "rock" by punching the boy. Confused by his sudden weakness, Rohan uses Heaven's Door on Ken and learns of his new power. However, Ken defies Heaven's Door's orders, having gained a third of its power as well. After losing another game, Rohan plays "paper" early, but forces the boy to curl his fist in anger at the last moment by showing him the volume with Hot Summer Martha's changed design. Having won the match, Rohan regains his full strength, but leaves the volume behind for Ken with a signature of the character's original design.
9	"Poaching Seashore" "Mitsuryō Kaigan" (密漁海岸)	May 5, 2024
Izumi suggests to Rohan that they hold their meeting at a newly-opened Italian restaurant nearby. The owner and chef, Tonio Trussardi, welcomes them as his first customers. The two discover that his dishes have temporary adverse effects on their health, from Kyoka's eyeballs shriveling up to Rohan's back shredding apart; however, their improved condition afterward leads Rohan to believe Tonio became a chef to heal people. Indeed, Tonio gained the power to use poison as a healing supplement after nearly dying to a scorpion's venom in Mexico. Tonio also reveals that he came to Japan to heal his fianceé, Hatsune Morishima, who suffers from a brain tumor. His hope of curing her rests in a special breed of abalone found only at the nearby Hyogara Rocks under certain conditions. That night, Rohan and Tonio visit the rocks to poach the abalones, only to realize that their prey clings onto its predators and sinks them until they drown. On the brink of death, Rohan orders an octopus to pry off and devour the abalones, allowing it to absorb their healing properties. By substituting the octopus for the abalones, Tonio cures Hatsune with his cooking.
Special	"The Other Poaching Seashore" "Mō Hitotsu no Mitsuryō Kaigan" (もうひとつの密漁海岸)	May 18, 2024
While Rohan and Tonio are out poaching, Izumi and Hatsune dine together at Tonio's restaurant. Hatsune tells Izumi about her special, lifelong bond with cooking.
Special	"Kyoka Izumi Will Not Be Silenced" "Izumi Kyoka wa Damaranai" (泉京香は黙らない)	May 4, 2026
After skipping a date with her boyfriend Kansuke, Izumi tells Rohan about a new hit manga artist named Mika Saion, who she helped discover. Rohan immediately notices the mismatch between her poor art and inspired dialogue, causing Izumi to suspect plagiarism. To allay her fears, Izumi visits Mika in person at her house, but learns that she is mute from her brother. Still dissatisfied, Izumi investigates further, and soon discovers that Mika has the power to steal "voices" from people and things, turning the former into obedient servants she can speak through. As Mika pursues Izumi to steal her voice as well, Kansuke arrives at the house, only to fall victim to Mika's power and leave Izumi cornered in the process. However, Izumi tricks Mika into using her power on Kansuke's digital voice recorder, which she says holds thousands of voices. The cacophony of absorbing all of those voices at once drives Mika to swallow her own tongue, leaving her comatose and freeing her victims. The news of Mika's various kidnappings make headlines, causing all volumes of her manga to be recalled. Kansuke later breaks up with Izumi, unable to keep up with her hectic life.

=== Films ===
No.	Title	Original release date
1	"Rohan at the Louvre" "Kishibe Rohan Rūvuru e Iku" (岸辺露伴 ルーヴルへ行く)	May 26, 2023
Rohan bids on and wins an entirely black painting by the recently-deceased Maurice Legrand titled Noire, which he says is a recreation of a painting in the Louvre by Nizaemon Yamamura. Rohan had heard of the original painting in his youth from Nanase, a young woman staying at his grandmother's inn, who called it an evil painting. To investigate the "Black Painting," Rohan and Izumi visit Paris, where they meet their interpreter, Emma Noguchi, as well as curator Ryunosuke Tatsumi. Emma discovers that the painting is held in an abandoned underground warehouse with the ID Z-17, and the four are joined by a pair of firefighters as they head for the site. There, the group finds a painting by Johannes Vermeer, which Rohan concludes to be an original work, exposing Tatsumi and the firefighters as art smugglers and Legrand as their forger. However, the group is then attacked by the spirits of their ancestors, summoned by Nizaemon's curse on the Black Painting. The firefighters and Tatsumi are killed, starting a fire in the process. As Izumi drags Emma out of the warehouse, Rohan is confronted by Nizaemon. However, Nanase appears and holds him back, telling Rohan to forget everything. Rohan uses Heaven's Door to temporarily do so, dispelling the curse as he leaves the Black Painting behind to be burned. Back in Japan, Rohan locates Nanase's grave and meets her ghost, who is revealed to have been Nizaemon's wife and Rohan's ancestor.
2	"At a Confessional" "Zange-shitsu" (懺悔室)	May 23, 2025
Rohan and Izumi arrive in Venice for a cultural exchange event held by the city's Accademia di Belle Arti. Rohan follows a man in a carnival mask into a church, where the man mistakes him for a priest and asks him to hear his confession. The man, Mizuo, had neglected a vagrant he encountered at a construction site ten years ago, causing the man's death. The vagrant's ghost put a curse on him, swearing revenge in his happiest moment; to avoid the curse, he swapped faces and identities with a pickpocket, only for the body double himself to die and swear revenge in his daughter's happiest moment. Later, Rohan meets a woman named Maria, who is engaged to be married to university director Lorenzo Grimani, and learns that she is Mizuo's daughter. Suspecting that Mizuo will attempt to foil his daughter's marriage by any means, Rohan and the couple decide to stage her death, helped by Rohan ordering Mizuo's assassin to fire a blank. Mizuo arrives just in time to see his daughter "die"; caught between relief and despair, he shambles away without realizing she is still alive. As Maria and Lorenzo finally have their wedding, Rohan admits his respect for Mizuo's tenacity.

=== Staff ===
- Original: Hirohiko Araki, Ballad Kitaguni (Episode 2)
- Director: Kazutaka Watanabe, Yutaro Seki (Special 2), Kentaro Hirase (Special 2)
- Screenwriter: Yasuko Kobayashi, Kazutaka Watanabe (Episode 9), Yutaro Seki (Special 2), Kentaro Hirase (Special 2)
- Music: Naruyoshi Kikuchi
- Recording: Shuhei Yamamoto
- Lighting: Koji Toriuchi
- Recording: Sou Takagi
- Arts: Sayaka Isogai
- Editor: Sho Suzuki
- Character Design Supervisor: Isao Tsuge
- Executive Producers: Keisuke Tsuchihashi, Daisuke Hiraga, Takayasu Suzuki (Episodes 1-3), Naoko Saito (Episodes 4-6)
- Production: NHK Enterprises
- Production, Writing: NHK, PICS (Films), Asmik Ace (Films)

== Reception ==
The first collected volume debuted to an estimated 278,268 copies sold for its first week on sale in Japan, ranking as third in the weekly Japanese top-50 comics charts, after Detective Conan volume 81 and Terra Formars volume 7. It charted for four consecutive weeks, selling a total of 422,994 copies. By May 2014, it had sold 526,719 copies, and by November, sales had reached 553,380, making it the 68th best selling manga volume in Japan of 2014. (Note: The "2014" period covers November 18, 2013 to November 16, 2014.) The second volume's standard and limited editions debuted to 132,283 and 20,128 copies sold, respectively, ranking as fourth and thirty-sixth in the weekly Japanese comic charts.

The series was well received by critics. Maria Antonietta Idotta of MangaForever said that the series managed to express full range of drama, depth, and complexity typical of Hirohiko Araki's long-form works despite its one-shot format, and called the artwork "sublime". Takato of Manga-News also found it to capture the essence of Araki's long-form JoJo's Bizarre Adventure while working as a newcomer-friendly stand-alone work, and enjoyed how the shorter format caused a stronger focus on the atmosphere and world, making it feel like more than just a spin-off. Erkael, also writing for Manga-News, thought the art and writing would both satisfy existing fans and attract new ones, and called it "a pleasure to read" despite the change in tone compared to JoJo's Bizarre Adventure, with more elements of horror and high tension.

Anime News Network had both Rebecca Silverman and Christopher Farris review the first English volume. Giving it a four out of five stars rating, Silverman called the collection a really interesting set of short supernatural mysteries that feel like post-Code American horror comics of the 1970s. She did note that readers unfamiliar with JoJo's Bizarre Adventure would have to piece together things like Stands, which were intrinsic to the story. Farris compared Rohan's "relatively minimal involvement" in the stories to that of The Crypt-Keeper, and felt it made the collection come off like a horror anthology. He also found being able to watch "Araki's ongoing evolution as an artist and storyteller" over the span of 16 years, to be an unintentionally-engaging element. Karen Maeda of Sequential Tart, who noted she had almost no knowledge of JoJo's Bizarre Adventure, found herself "completely sucked in" by the second story, wondering what Rohan and his magical power was going to do next. Giving the collection an eight out of 10 rating, she wrote that the stories fell into the horror genre, but "are more weird than gory."
