= Marie Iitoyo =

Japanese actress and fashion model (born 1998)

- 飯豊 まりえ
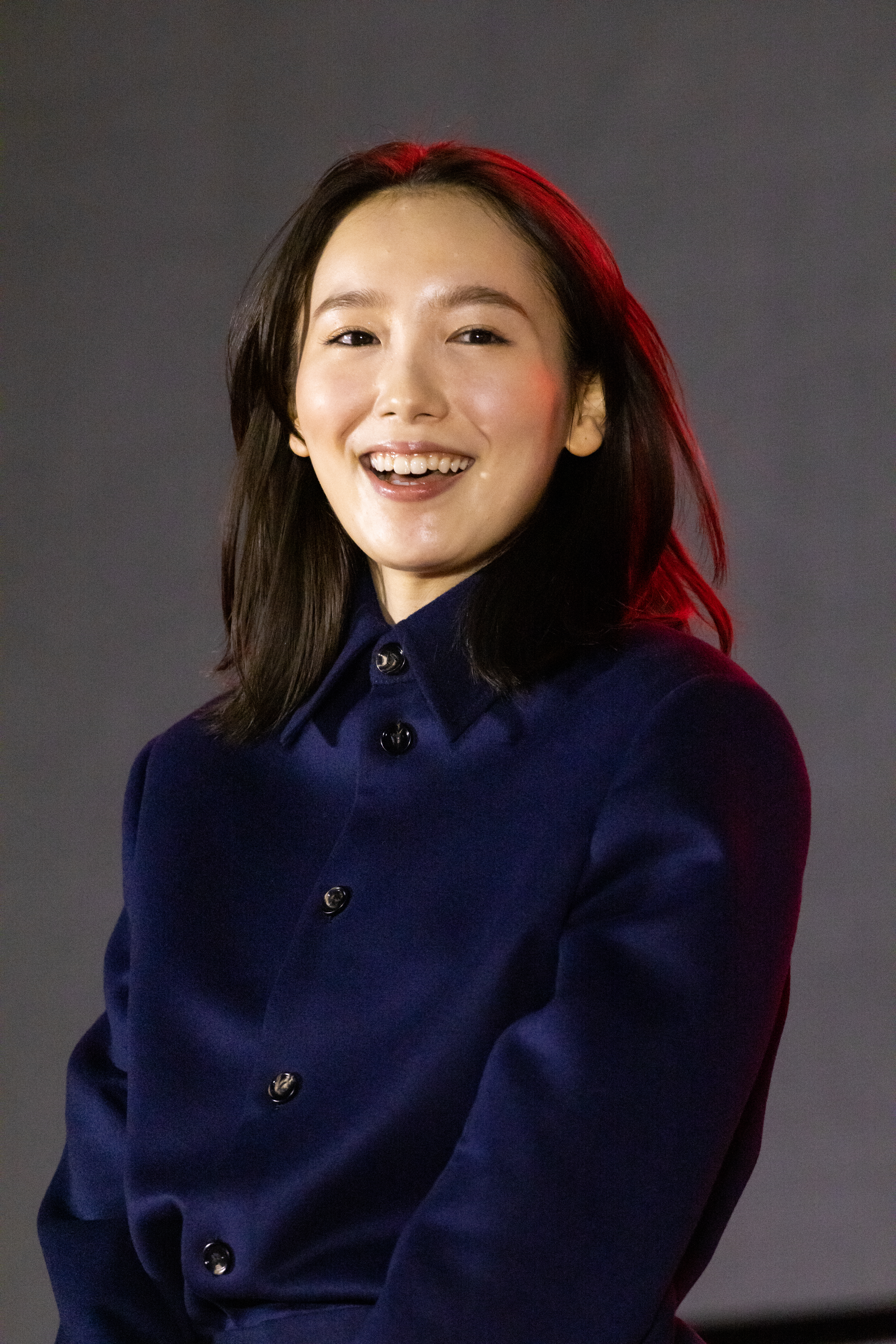
- Iitoyo in 2022
- Born: January 5, 1998 (age 28); Chiba, Chiba Prefecture, Japan
- Occupations: Actress; model
- Years active: 2008–present
- Agent: Avex Management
- Height: 1.67 m (5 ft 6 in)
- Spouse: Issey Takahashi (m. 2024)

Marie Iitoyo (飯豊 まりえ; born January 5, 1998) is a Japanese actress and fashion model.

== Personal life ==
Iitoyo was born on January 5, 1998 in Chiba, as an only child. She met Tina Tamashiro while in high school. Their goal was to star in a film together after graduating. They later co-starred in the drama Dark Girl. She is also good friends with actress Nanase Nishino.

On May 16, 2024, Iitoyo and actor Issey Takahashi, who is eighteen years her senior, jointly announced through their respective agencies that they had registered their marriage. The couple revealed that they met on the set of the live-action adaptation of Thus Spoke Rohan Kishibe, in which they had co-starred.

== Filmography ==
=== Television ===
Year	Title	Role	Notes	Ref.
2013–14	Zyuden Sentai Kyoryuger	Yayoi Ulshade/Kyoryu Violet (II)		
2020–24	Thus Spoke Rohan Kishibe	Kyōka Izumi	9 episodes	
2022	Chimudondon	Ai Ōno	Asadora	
2022	Hiru	Hako		
2026	Izumi Kyoka wa Damaranai	Kyōka Izumi	Lead role; television film	

=== Film ===
Year	Title	Role	Notes	Ref.
2014	Zyuden Sentai Kyoryuger vs. Go-Busters: The Great Dinosaur Battle! Farewell Our Eternal Friends	Yayoi Ulshade		
2019	Go Away, Ultramarine	Yū Manabe		
2019	The Flowers of Evil	Aya Tokiwa		
2020	Stare	Mizuki	Lead role	
2021	Remain in Twilight	Hiromi		
2022	The Tunnel to Summer, the Exit of Goodbyes	Anzu Hanashiro (voice)		
2023	Black Clover: Sword of the Wizard King	Milly Maxwell (voice)		
2023	Rohan at the Louvre	Kyōka Izumi		
2024	Ohsama Sentai King-Ohger Vs Zyuden Sentai Kyoryuger	Yayoi Ulshade/Kyoryu Violet(II)		
2025	Thus Spoke Rohan Kishibe: At a Confessional	Kyōka Izumi		

=== Japanese dub ===
Year	Title	Role	Voice dub for	Other notes	Ref.
2021	Tom & Jerry	DJ Dove, Woman in the Park			

== Publications ==
=== Fashion Magazines ===
- Niko☆Puchi（April 2009 issue - June 2011 issue） - Exclusive model
- Nicola（June 2011 issue - May 2014 issue） - Exclusive model
- Seventeen（September 2014 issue - July 2018 issue） - Exclusive model
- Oggi（August 2018 issue - current） - Regular model, exclusive model since May 2019 issue.
