= Ii clan =

Japanese clan which originates in Tōtōmi Province

Ii 井伊
- The Ii clan mon
- Home province: Mikawa
- Parent house: Fujiwara clan
- Titles: Various
- Founder: Fujiwara Tomosuke
- Current head: Takeo Ii
- Dissolution: Still extant

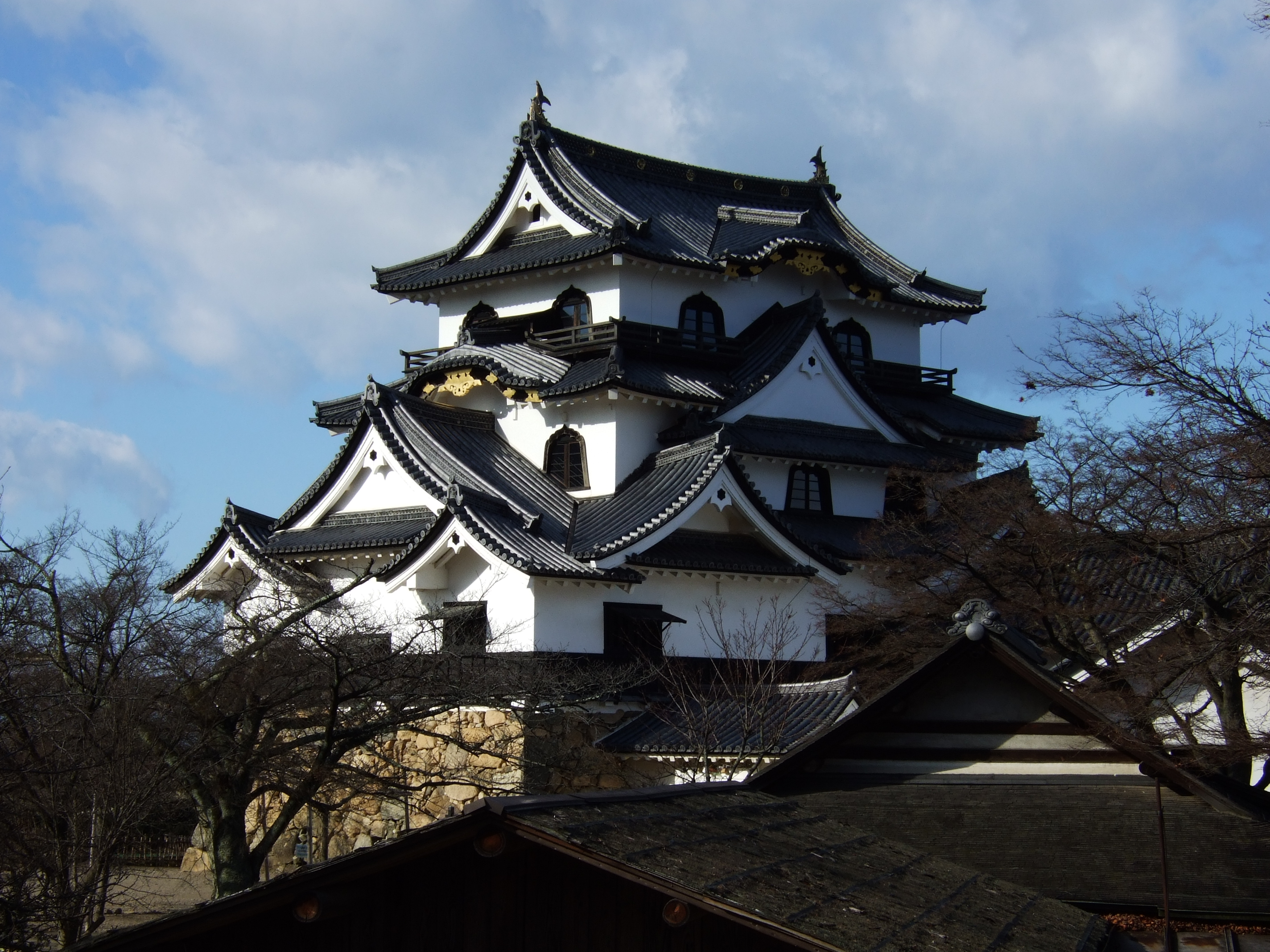
Hikone Castle, the seat of the Ii clan during the Edo period

Ii clan (Japanese: 井伊氏, Hepburn: Ii-shi) (Note: Ii with two "i"s) is a Japanese clan which originates in Tōtōmi Province. It was a retainer clan of the Imagawa family, and then switched sides to the Matsudaira clan of Mikawa Province at the reign of Ii Naotora. A famed 16th-century clan member, Ii Naomasa, adopted son of Ii Naotora, was Tokugawa Ieyasu's son-in-law and one of his most important generals. He received the fief of Hikone in Ōmi Province as a reward for his conduct in battle at Sekigahara. The Ii and a few sub-branches remained daimyō for the duration of the Edo period. Ii Naosuke, the famed politician of the late Edo period, was another member of this clan.

The clan claims descent from Fujiwara no Yoshikado, who had been one of the Daijō daijin during the ninth century.

== Heads of the family ==
1. Ii Tomoyasu (1010-1093)
2. Ii Tomomune
3. Ii Munetsuna
4. Ii Tomofumi
5. Ii Tomoie
6. Ii Tomonao
7. Ii Korenao
8. Ii Morinao
9. Ii Yoshinao
10. Ii Yanonao
11. Ii Yasunao
12. Ii Yukinao (1309-1354)
13. Ii Kagenao
14. Ii Tadanao
15. Ii Naouji
16. Ii Naohira
17. Ii Naomune
18. Ii Naomori
19. Ii Naochika
20. Ii Naotora
21. Ii Naomasa
22. Ii Naokatsu
23. Ii Naotaka
24. Ii Naozumi (1625-1676)
25. Ii Naooki (1656-1717)
26. Ii Naomichi (1689-1710)
27. Ii Naotsune (1693-1710)
28. Ii Naooki (second time;1656-1717)
29. Ii Naonobu (1700-1736)
30. Ii Naosada (1700-1760)
31. Ii Naoyoshi (1727-1754)
32. Ii Naosada (second time;1700-1760)
33. Ii Naohide (1729-1789)
34. Ii Naonaka (1766-1831)
35. Ii Naoaki (1794-1850)
36. Ii Naosuke
37. Ii Naonori
38. Naotada Ii (1881-1947)
39. Naoyoshi Ii (1910-1993)
40. Naohide Ii
41. Takeo Ii (b.1969)

== Family members ==
- Ii Naohira (井伊 直平, 1479?–1563)
- Ii Naomori (井伊 直盛, 1526–1560)
- Ii Naomune (井伊 直宗, ?–1542)
- Ii Naomitsu (井伊 直満, ?–1545)
- Ii Naochika (井伊 直親, 1535–1563)
- Ii Naoyoshi (井伊 直義, ?–1545)
- Ii Naotora (井伊 直虎, d. 1582)
- Ii Naomasa (井伊 直政, 1561–1602)
  - Tobai-in (唐梅院, d. 1639)
- Ii Naokatsu (井伊 直勝, 1590–1662)
- Ii Naotaka (井伊 直孝, 1590–1659)
- Ii Naoshige (井伊 直茂, 1612- July 5, 1661)
- Ii Naoharu (井伊 直春, April 25, 1719 – December 1, 1732)
- Ii Naosuke (井伊 直弼, November 29, 1815 – March 24, 1860)
- Ii Naonori (井伊 直憲, May 22, 1848 – January 9, 1904)
