= Ii Naohira =

Japanese samurai

Head of Ii clan
- Preceded by: Ii Naouji
- Succeeded by: Ii Naomune

Personal details
- Born: 1479? or 1489?
- Died: October 5, 1563

Military service
- Allegiance: Imagawa clan
- Unit: Ii clan

Ii Naohira (井伊 直平; 1479? or 1489? - October 5, 1563) was a Japanese samurai of the Sengoku period, who served the Imagawa clan. He was born in 1479 or 1489, as the son of Ii Naouji, the lord of Iinoya castle.

In 1507, he contributed three rice paddies to Jijōin, the family temple and the birthplace his ancestor, Ii Tomoyasu. Ii invited the priest Mokushū Zuien to Iinoho (Iinoya) and changed the temple name from Jijōin to Ryūtaiji. In 1511, he gave productive land to Hohta Sukeshiro and communicated that to Hohta Negi.

His known daughter became the concubine of Imagawa Yoshimoto for a time before married Sekiguchi Chikanaga. She bore the famous Lady Tsukiyama, the first wife of Tokugawa Ieyasu, from that marriage.

His great-grandson Ii Naomasa was adopted by Ii Naotora, and became a feared general under Tokugawa Ieyasu who is considered one of his Four Guardians.

== Family ==
- Father: Ii Naouji
- Wife: Ihira Sadanao’s daughter
- Children:
  - Ii Naomune by Ihira Sadanao’s daughter
  - Ii Naomitsu by Ihira Sadanao’s daughter
  - Ii Naoyoshi by Ihira Sadanao’s daughter
  - Ii Naomoto
  - Ihira Naoyasu
  - daughter become Imagawa Yoshimoto’s concubine later married Sekiguchi Chikanga
