= Tetsuo Owada =

- Born: February 1, 1944 (age 82); Shizuoka Prefecture, Japan
- Occupation: Historian

Academic work
- Institutions: Shizuoka University

Tetsuo Owada (小和田 哲男, Owada Tetsuo; born February 1, 1944) is a Japanese historian and emeritus professor of Shizuoka University.

Owada graduated from Waseda University. His work focuses on the studies of history and castles in the Sengoku period of Japan. He is especially famous for his research into the Imagawa clan and Later Hōjō clan. He often works as a historical consultant for the Taiga drama series and makes television appearances on NHK.

== Selected published works ==
- 国盗り物語"の旅 道三と信長の遺跡をたずねて (Kunitori Monogatari no Tabi Dōsan to Nobunaga no Iskiwo Tazunete) (1972)
- 駿河今川一族 (Suruga Imagawa Ichizoku) (1983)
- 後北条氏研究 (Go Hōjō shi Kenkyu) (1983)
- 北条早雲とその子孫 知られざる北条五代の実像 (Hōjō Sōun to Sono Shison Shirarezaru Hōjō Godai no Jitsuzō) (1990)
- 毛利元就知将の戦略・戦術 (Mōri Motonari Chishō no Senryaku.Senjyutsu) (1996)
- 伊達政宗: 史伝 (Date Masamune: Shiden) (2000) (Gakken)
- 甲陽軍鑑入門：武田軍団強さの秘密 (Kōyō Gunkan Nyumon : Takeda Gundan Tsuyosa no Himitsu) (2006) (Kadokawa)
- 戦国の城 (Sengoku no Shiro) (2007) (Gakken)
- 黒田官兵衛：智謀の戦国軍師 (Kuroda Kanbei: Eichi no Sengokugunshi) (2013)
- 戦国大名と読書 (Sengoku Daimyō to Dokusho) (2014)
- 駿河今川氏十代 戦国大名への発展の軌跡 (Suruga Imagawa Shi Jyudai Sengoku Daimyō eno Hattn to Kiseki) (2015)
- 戦国静岡の城と武将と合戦と (Sengoku Shizuoka no Shiro to Bushō to Kassen) (2015)
- 戦国武将の実力 111人の通信簿 (Sengoku Bushō no Jitsuryoku Hyakujyuichinin no Tsushimbo) (2015)
- 知識ゼロからの真田幸村入門 (Chishiki Zerokarano Sanada Yukimura Nyumon) (2015) (Gentosha)
- 井伊直虎：戦国井伊一族と東国動乱史 (Ii Naotora: Sengoku Iiichizoku to Tōgokudōranshi) (2016)
- 戦国武将の叡智 (Sengoku Bushō no Eichi) (2020)

== See also ==
- Japanese castle
- Yoshihiro Senda
