= Ii Naomune =

Samurai from the Sengoku period

Head of Ii clan
- Preceded by: Ii Naohira
- Succeeded by: Ii Naomori

Personal details
- Died: February 13, 1542
- Children: Ii Naomori

Military service
- Allegiance: Imagawa clan
- Unit: Ii clan

Ii Naomune (井伊 直宗; ? – February 13, 1542) was a Japanese samurai from the Sengoku period who served the Imagawa clan. He was the son of Ii Naohira.

Ii Naomune was from Tōtōmi, but became a vassal of Imagawa. He followed his father as the head of the household. He participated in a Mikawa Kuni Tahara Castle attack in 1542 and was killed in action. Ii Naomori of the child inherited a trace.

== Family ==
- Father: Ii Naohira
- Mother: Ihira Sadanao’s daughter
- Wife: Joshin’in
- Son: Ii Naomori
