= Ii Naomori =

Samurai (d. 1560)

Head of Ii clan
- In office 1542–1560
- Preceded by: Ii Naomune
- Succeeded by: Ii Naotora

Personal details
- Born: 1506 or 1526
- Died: June 12, 1560
- Children: Ii Naotora
- Parent: Ii Naomune (father)

Military service
- Allegiance: Imagawa clan
- Unit: Ii clan
- Battles/wars: Battle of Okehazama

Ii Naomori (井伊 直盛; 1506 or 1526 – June 12, 1560) was a retainer of the Japanese Imagawa clan during the Sengoku period of the 16th century. His childhood name was Toramatsu (虎松). Naomori's daughter was Ii Naotora who succeeded him as head of the Ii clan.

During the Battle of Okehazama in 1560, Naomori was killed while trying to protect his lord, Imagawa Yoshimoto during the attack led by Oda Nobunaga, who surprised his enemy when he attacked in thick fog following a hard rain.

Later, his daughter, Naotora, adopted Ii Naomasa as her son, who become one of the Four Guardian Kings of Tokugawa Ieyasu.

== Family ==
- Father: Ii Naomune
- Mother: Joshin’in
- Wife: Yugiri (d.1578)
- Daughter: Ii Naotora
- Adopted son: Ii Naochika
