= Ii Naochika =

Japanese samurai

Ii Naochika (井伊 直親, 1535 - January 8, 1563) was a Japanese samurai of the Sengoku period, who served the Imagawa clan. It was planned that he would marry Ii Naomori's daughter Naotora but then he fled to Shinano, to avoid committing suicide caused by slander from an Imagawa retainer. Later he went back to Imagawa, now newly married. Once again he was slandered and was eventually executed by Imagawa Ujizane. It's said that he was killed by a cause of anonymous report of Ono Michiyoshi. His childhood name was Kamenojo (亀之丞).

His son Ii Naomasa was adopted by Naotora, and became a feared general under Tokugawa Ieyasu who is considered one of his Four Guardians.

== Family ==
- Foster father: Ii Naomori
- Father: Ii Naomitsu
- Mother: Sister of Suzuki Shigetoki
- Wife: Okuyama Hiyo (d.1585)
- Concubine: daughter from Shiozawa clan
- Children:
  - Ii Yoshinao
  - Ii Naomasa by Okuyama Hiyo
  - Takasehime married Kawate Yoshinori by daughter from Shiozawa clan
