= Ii Naomitsu =

Japanese samurai

Ii Naomitsu (井伊 直満, ? - February 4, 1545) was a Japanese samurai of the Sengoku period, who had served in the Imagawa clan. He was the son of Ii Naohira.

== Life ==
Ii Naomitsu (井伊 直満) was a native of Tōtōmi, but served Yoshimoto Imagawa, following his father Ii Naohira. Due to the fact that in Naomoria, a son was not equal to his nephew in the order of inheritance, the older brother Naomune was the next in line to inherit the family estate. With that, he promised to put Naochika, the child of their own heir, up for adoption. However, defamatory words of Ono Masanao with Naoyoshi, the younger brother, Yoshimoto Imagawa, threatened the child in 1544. Naochika had purchased the antipathy of the vassal, voiding his birthright. He died earlier than his father, Naohira.
