= Tokugawa Ieyasu =

Shogun of Japan from 1603 to 1605

Senior First Rank Tokugawa Ieyasu
- 徳川 家康
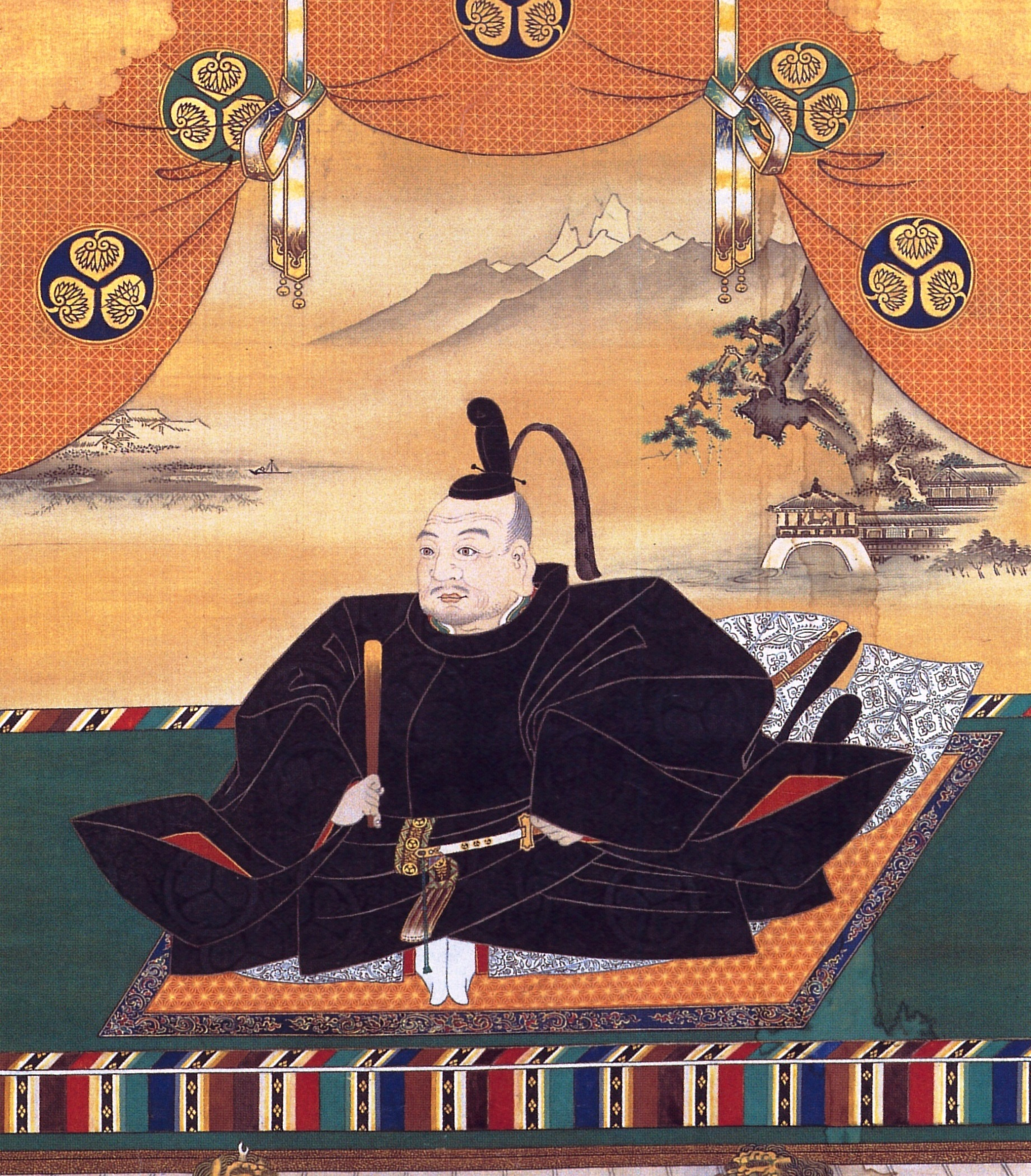
- Portrait by Kanō Tan'yū

Shōgun
- In office March 24, 1603 – April 16, 1605
- Monarch: Go-Yōzei
- Preceded by: Ashikaga Yoshiaki
- Succeeded by: Tokugawa Hidetada

Head of Matsudaira clan
- In office 1549–1616
- Preceded by: Matsudaira Hirotada
- Succeeded by: Tokugawa Hidetada

Head of Tokugawa clan
- In office 1567–1616
- Succeeded by: Tokugawa Hidetada

Chancellor (Daijō-daijin) of Japan
- In office May 2, 1616 – June 1, 1616

Personal details
- Born: Matsudaira Takechiyo; January 31, 1543 Okazaki Castle, Mikawa, Japan
- Died: June 1, 1616 (aged 73) Sunpu Castle, Japan
- Spouses: Lady Tsukiyama; Asahi no kata
- Domestic partners: Concubines: Lady Saigō; Lady Chaa; Okaji no Kata; Lady Acha; among others...
- Children: Matsudaira Nobuyasu; Kamehime; Toku-hime; Yūki Hideyasu; Tokugawa Hidetada; Matsudaira Tadayoshi; Takeda Nobuyoshi; Matsudaira Tadateru; Matsudaira Matsuchiyo; Matsudaira Senchiyo; Tokugawa Yoshinao; Tokugawa Yorinobu; Tokugawa Yorifusa; Furihime; Matsuhime; Ichihime; among others...
- Parents: Matsudaira Hirotada (father); Odai no Kata (mother)
- Other names: Matsudaira Jirōsaburō Motonobu (松平 次郎三郎 元信); Matsudaira Kuradonosuke Motoyasu (松平 蔵人佐 元康); Matsudaira Ieyasu (松平 家康)
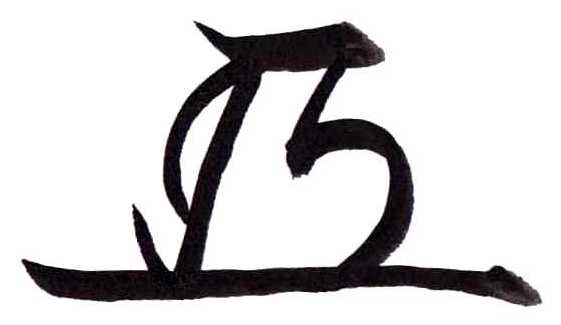
- Signature
- Nickname: "Tosho Dai-Gongen"

Military service
- Allegiance: Matsudaira clan; Imagawa clan; Oda clan; Toyotomi clan; Eastern Army; Imperial Court; Tokugawa shogunate
- Unit: Tokugawa clan
- Commands: Edo Castle
- Battles/wars: Siege of Terabe; Siege of Marune; Siege of Kaminogō; Mikawa Ikkō-ikki rebellion; Battle of Batogahara; Tōtōmi Campaign; Battle of Anegawa; Battle of Mikatagahara; Battle of Nagashino; Suruga Campaign; Siege of Takatenjin; Battle of Tenmokuzan; Tenshō-Jingo war; Battle of Komaki and Nagakute; Siege of Odawara; Kunohe Rebellion; Sekigahara Campaign; Battle of Sekigahara; Osaka Campaign; see below

Japanese name
- Kyūjitai: 德川 家康
- Shinjitai: 徳川 家康
Transcriptions
- Romanization: Tokugawa Ieyasu

Tokugawa Ieyasu (Note: 徳川 家康, Japanese pronunciation: [to.kɯꜜ.ɡa.wa | i.eꜜ.ja.sɯ, -kɯ.ɡa.wa i.eꜜ-, -kɯꜜ.ɡa.wa (|) i.e-, -ŋa.wa-]) (Note: Ieyasu's given name is sometimes spelled Iyeyasu, according to the historical pronunciation of the kana character he. He was posthumously enshrined at Nikkō Tōshō-gū with the name Tōshō Daigongen (東照大権現).) (born Matsudaira Takechiyo; (Note: 松平 竹千代) (Note: He later took other names, which include Matsudaira Jirōsaburō Motonobu, Matsudaira Kurandonosuke Motoyasu, and finally, Tokugawa Ieyasu.) January 31, 1543 – June 1, 1616) was a Japanese samurai, daimyo and the founder and first shogun of the Tokugawa shogunate of Japan, which ruled from 1603 until the Meiji Restoration in 1868. He was the third of the three "Great Unifiers" of Japan, along with his former lord Oda Nobunaga and fellow Oda subordinate Toyotomi Hideyoshi. The son of a minor daimyo, Ieyasu once lived as a hostage under daimyo Imagawa Yoshimoto on behalf of his father. He later succeeded as daimyo after his father's death, serving as ally, vassal, and general of the Oda clan, and building up his strength under Oda Nobunaga.

After Oda Nobunaga's death, Ieyasu was briefly a rival of Toyotomi Hideyoshi, before declaring his allegiance to Toyotomi and fighting on his behalf. Under Toyotomi, Ieyasu was relocated to the Kanto plains in eastern Japan, away from the Toyotomi power base in Osaka. He built his castle in the fishing village of Edo (now Tokyo). He became the most powerful daimyo and the most senior officer under the Toyotomi regime. Ieyasu preserved his strength during Toyotomi's failed attempts to conquer Korea. After Hideyoshi's death and the Battle of Sekigahara, Ieyasu seized power in 1600.

He received appointment as shōgun in 1603, and voluntarily resigned from his position in 1605, although he still held the de facto control of government until his death in 1616. He implemented a set of careful rules known as the bakuhan system. This system used precisely graded rewards and punishments to encourage (or compel) the daimyo and samurai to live in peace with each other under the Tokugawa shogunate. Following his death, his successors shifted the government to Edo in 1638 and enacted the sakoku policy of isolationism in 1639 which closed off Japan from the outside world for over 200 years (with some exceptions) until the Meiji era began in 1868.

== Early life (1543–1561) ==
Tokugawa Ieyasu was born in Okazaki Castle on the 26th day of the twelfth month of the eleventh year of Tenbun, according to the Japanese calendar, January 31, 1543 according to the Western calendar. Originally named Matsudaira Takechiyo (松平 竹千代), he was the son of Matsudaira Hirotada (松平 広忠), the daimyo of Mikawa of the Matsudaira clan, and Odai no Kata (於大の方; Lady Odai), the daughter of a neighbouring samurai lord, Mizuno Tadamasa (水野 忠政). His mother and father were step-siblings. They were 17 and 15 years old, respectively, when Takechiyo was born.

During the Muromachi period, the Matsudaira clan controlled a portion of Mikawa Province (the eastern half of modern Aichi Prefecture). Ieyasu's father, Matsudaira Hirotada, was a minor local warlord based at Okazaki Castle who controlled a portion of the Tōkaidō highway linking Kyoto with the eastern provinces. His territory was surrounded by stronger and predatory neighbors, including the Imagawa clan based in Suruga Province to the east and the Oda clan to the west. Hirotada's main enemy was Oda Nobuhide, the father of Oda Nobunaga.

In the year of Takechiyo's birth, the Matsudaira clan split. Hirotada's uncle, Matsudaira Nobutaka defected to the Oda clan. This gave Oda Nobuhide the confidence to attack Okazaki. Soon afterwards, Hirotada's father-in-law died, and his heir, Mizuno Nobumoto, revived the clan's traditional enmity against the Matsudaira and declared allegiance to Oda Nobuhide as well. As a result, Hirotada divorced Odai-no-kata and sent her back to her family. Hirotada later married different wives, and Takechiyo eventually had 11 half-brothers and sisters.

=== Hostage life ===
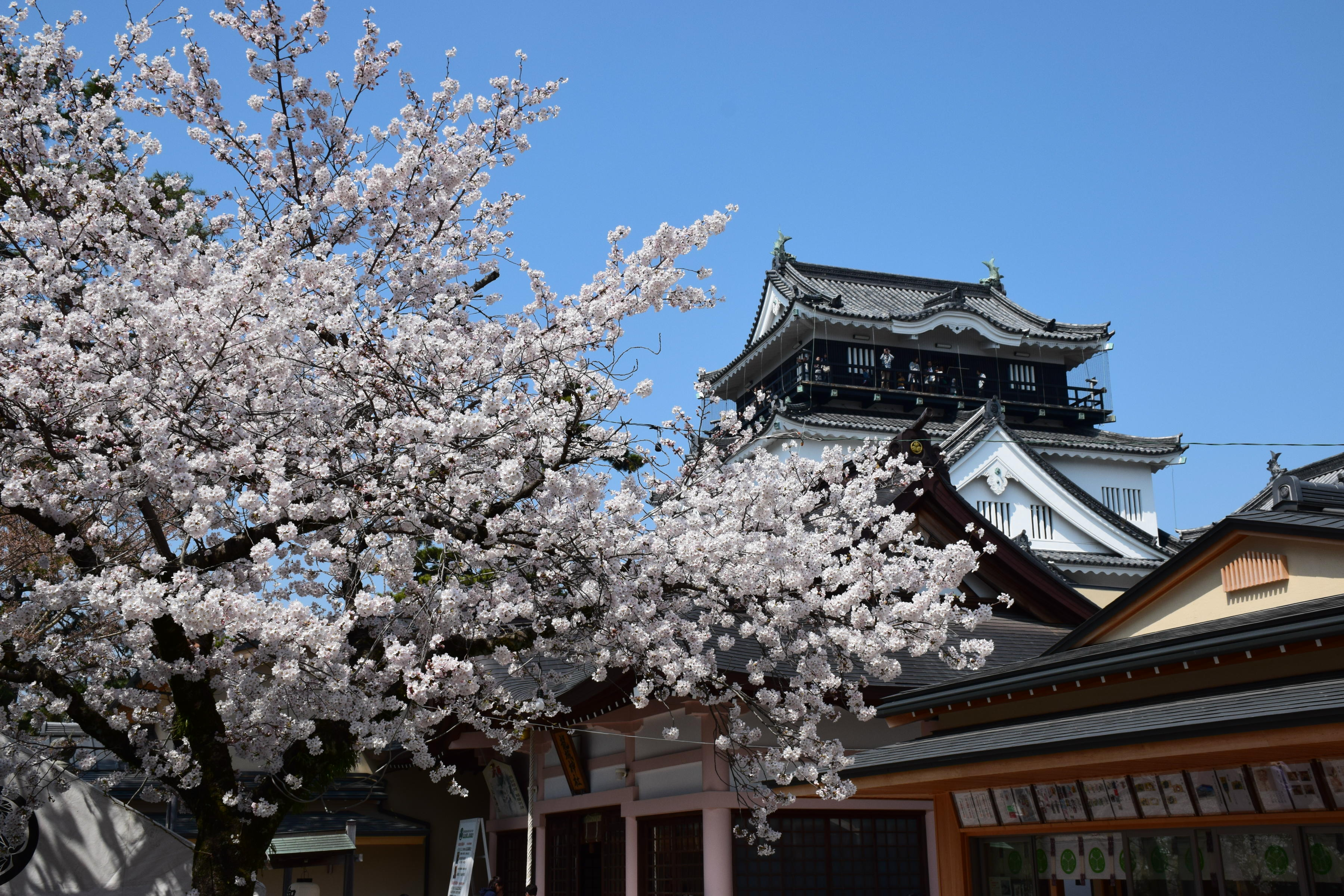
Okazaki Castle, the birthplace of Tokugawa Ieyasu

As Oda Nobuhide continued to attack Okazaki, Hirotada turned to his powerful eastern neighbor, Imagawa Yoshimoto, for assistance. Yoshimoto agreed to an alliance under the condition that Hirotada send his young heir to Sunpu Domain as a hostage. Oda Nobuhide learned of this arrangement and had Takechiyo abducted. Takechiyo was five years old at the time. Nobuhide threatened to execute Takechiyo unless his father severed all ties with the Imagawa clan. However, Hirotada refused, stating that sacrificing his own son would show his seriousness in his pact with the Imagawa. Despite this refusal, Nobuhide chose not to kill Takechiyo, but instead held him hostage for the next three years at the Honshōji Temple in Nagoya. It was rumored that Oda Nobunaga met Takechiyo at the temple, when Takechiyo was six years old, and Nobunaga was 14. However, Katsuhiro Taniguchi reported there is no concrete historical records about this story of first meeting between Takechiyo with Nobunaga.

In 1549, when Takechiyo was six, his father Hirotada died of unknown causes. There was a popular theory that he was murdered by his vassals, who had been bribed by the Oda clan. However, a scholarly article published by Muraoka Mikio in 2015 states that the assassination theory is unreliable and Hirotada's death may have been caused by a natural illness.

Around the same time, Oda Nobuhide died during an epidemic. Nobuhide's death dealt a heavy blow to the Oda clan.

In 1551, an army under the command of Imagawa Sessai laid siege to the castle where Oda Nobuhiro, Nobuhide's illegitimate eldest son, was living. Nobuhiro was trapped by the Imagawa clan but was saved through negotiation by Oda Nobunaga, Nobuhide's second son and heir. Sessai made an agreement with Nobunaga to take Takechiyo back to Imagawa, and he agreed. Takechiyo, now nine years old, was taken as a hostage to Sunpu.

At Sunpu, he was treated fairly well as a potentially useful ally of the Imagawa clan until 1556 when he was 14 years old. Yoshimoto decided that the Matsudaira clan's territory would be inherited by Takechiyo in the future, with the aim that the Imagawa clan could rule the area by extensions of their Matsudaira clan as their vassal, including Zuien-in (the daughter of Matsudaira Nobutada and Takechiyo's great-aunt), who was the only member of the Anjo Matsudaira clan left in Okazaki Castle. (Note: In addition, during this time of hostages in Sunpu, Hojo Ujinori of Hōjō clan was also a hostage in Sunpu castle, so there is a theory that Ieyasu and Ujinori had been friends since that time, and this theory was included in the Dai Nihon Shiryō (collection of historical documents from the ninth to the seventeenth century) and other sources.)

=== Service under Imagawa clan ===
In 1556, Takechiyo officially came of age, with Imagawa Yoshimoto presiding over his genpuku ceremony. Following tradition, he changed his name from Matsudaira Takechiyo to Matsudaira Jirōsaburō Motonobu (松平 次郎三郎 元信). He was also briefly allowed to visit Okazaki to pay his respects to the tomb of his father, and receive the homage of his nominal retainers, led by the karō Torii Tadayoshi.

One year later, at the age of 15 (according to East Asian age reckoning), he married his first wife, Lady Tsukiyama, a relative of Imagawa Yoshimoto, and changed his name again to Matsudaira Kurandonosuke Motoyasu (松平 蔵人佐 元康). A year later, their son, Matsudaira Nobuyasu, was born. He was then allowed to return to Mikawa Province. There, the Imagawa ordered him to fight against the Oda clan in a series of battles.

Motoyasu fought his first battle in 1558 at the siege of Terabe. The lord of Terabe, Suzuki Shigeteru (or Suzuki Shigetatsu), betrayed the Imagawa by defecting to Oda Nobunaga. This was nominally within Matsudaira territory, so Imagawa Yoshimoto entrusted the campaign to Motoyasu and his retainers from Okazaki. Motoyasu led the attack in person, but after taking the outer defences, he burned the main castle and withdrew. As anticipated, the Oda forces attacked his rear lines, but Motoyasu was prepared and drove off the Oda army.

He then succeeded in delivering supplies during the siege of Odaka Castle a year later. Odaka was one of five disputed frontier forts under attack by the Oda clan, and the only one that still remained under Imagawa control. Motoyasu launched diversionary attacks against the two neighboring forts and, when the garrisons of the other forts came to assist, Motoyasu's supply column was able to reach Odaka.

By 1559, the leadership of the Oda clan had passed to Oda Nobunaga. In 1560, Imagawa Yoshimoto, leading a large army of 25,000 men, invaded Oda territory. Motoyasu was assigned a separate mission to capture the stronghold of Marune in the Siege of Marune operation. As a result, he and his men were not present at the Battle of Okehazama where Yoshimoto was killed in a surprise assault by Nobunaga, In the end, Motoyasu managed to capture Marune castle.

Later, in response to the news of Yoshimoto's death, Motoyasu sent lookouts to check the state of the battle and then retreated from Odaka Castle at midnight. After leaving Odaka Castle, Motoyasu's forces headed for Okazaki with Asai Michitada as their guide. On the way, they were stopped by the Mizuno clan's forces at Chiryu, but because Asai Michitada was with them, they were not attacked. Having escaped from danger, Motoyasu entered Daijuji Temple outside Okazaki Castle the following day.

With Imagawa Yoshimoto dead, and the Imagawa clan in a state of confusion, Motoyasu used the opportunity to assert his independence and marched his men back into the abandoned Okazaki Castle and reclaimed his ancestral seat. Motoyasu then decided to ally with Oda Nobunaga. Motoyasu's wife, Lady Tsukiyama, and infant son, Matsudaira Nobuyasu, were held hostage in Sunpu by Imagawa Ujizane, Yoshimoto's heir, so the deal was secret.

In 1561, Motoyasu openly ended his allegiance to the Imagawa clan and captured Kaminogō castle. Kaminogō was held by Udono Nagamochi. Resorting to stealth, Motoyasu forces under Hattori Hanzō attacked under cover of darkness, setting fire to the castle and capturing two of Udono's sons. He then used them as hostages to exchange for his wife and son.

On September 13, 1561, Motoyasu sent his commanders to the battle of Fujinami Nawate, one of a series of battles between the Kira clan and Matsudaira clan over Tojo Castle, the residence of the Tojo branch of the Kira clan. In this battle, Kira Yoshiaki's chief retainer, Tominaga Tadamoto, was killed by Honda Hirotaka at Fujinami Nawate near the castle (near Seto Fujinami, Kira-cho, Nishio City, Aichi Prefecture). Yoshiaki surrendered afterwards. However, Motoyasu also lost one of his commander, Okubo Tadahō, who was killed by Tadatomo during the battle.

== Ieyasu-Nobunaga Alliance (1562–1582) ==
Sometime in the aftermath of the Okehazama battle where Imagawa Yoshimoto was slain, Motoyasu formed the Kiyosu Alliance with Oda Nobunaga, daimyo lord of Owari Province and the head of the Oda clan. (Note: Historians cannot reach consensus about the exact date when the alliance was officially proclaimed. Some have said the alliance was established two years after the Okehazama battle, although Ieyasu himself did not attend Kiyosu castle personally, since there are no historical records about his visit during this time. Other theories from Akio Hirano deduced the alliance was only formally announced in 1573.)

In 1563, Matsudaira Nobuyasu, the first son of Motoyasu, was married to Oda Nobunaga's daughter Tokuhime. (Note: Tetsuo Owada stated the marriage between Nobuyasu and Tokuhime occurred in 1567, when both was nine years old.) In February, Matsudaira Motoyasu changed his name to Matsudaira Ieyasu. Some historians believe that these actions provoked the pro-Imagawa faction, including the Sakurai and Okusa Matsudaira families, which led to the simultaneous uprising against Ieyasu in the following year.

=== Unification of Mikawa ===
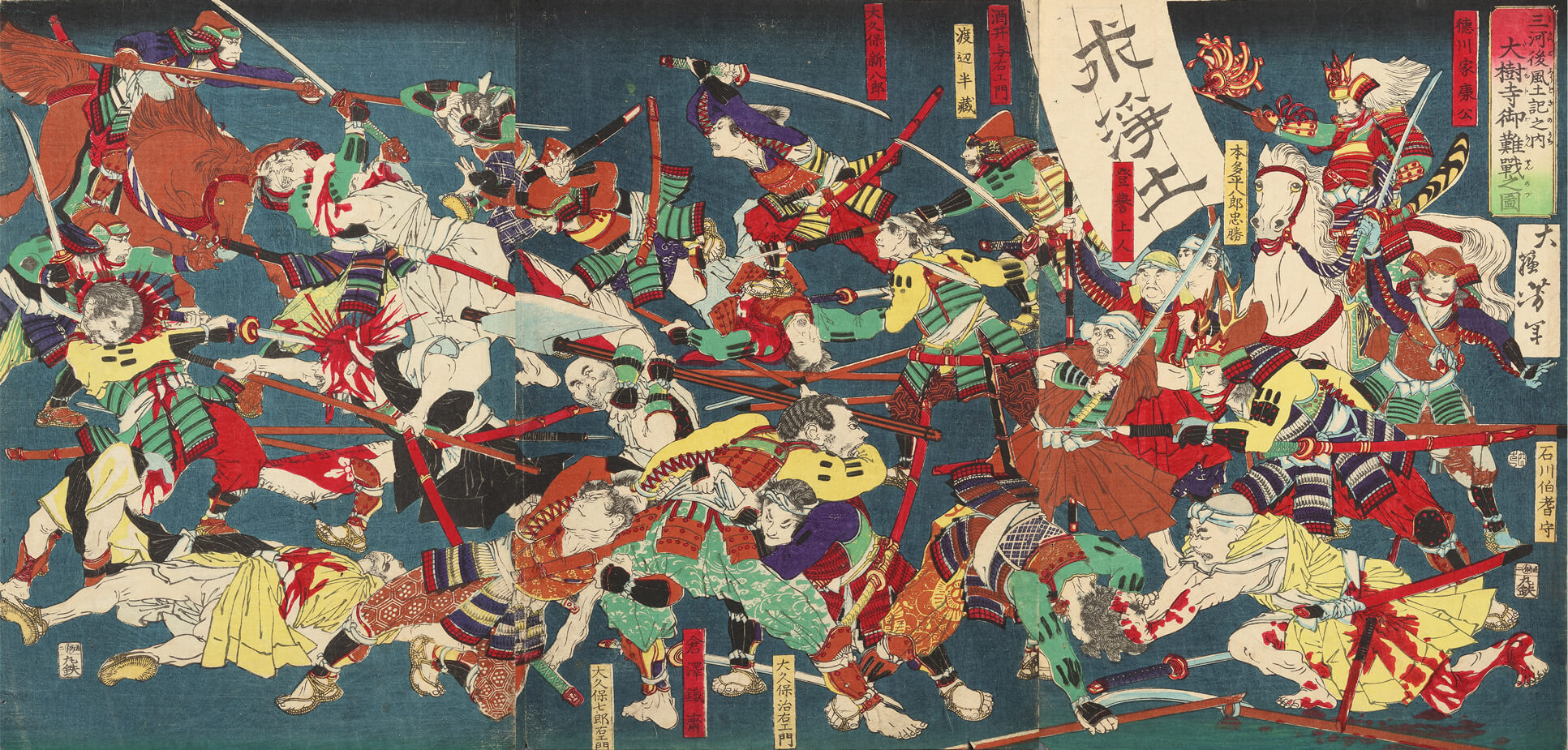
Ukiyo-e print depicting the Battle of Batogahara between Tokugawa clan against Ikkō-ikki movement in 1563–1564.

During this period, the Matsudaira clan faced a threat from the Ikkō-ikki movement, in which peasants banded together with militant monks under the Jōdo Shinshū sect, and rejected the traditional feudal social order. Ieyasu undertook several battles to suppress this movement in his territories, including the Battle of Azukizaka (1564).

Some of Ieyasu's vassals were in the Ikkō-ikki ranks, notably Honda Masanobu and Natsume Yoshinobu, who had deserted him for the Ikkō-ikki rebellion out of religious sympathy. However, many of Ieyasu's core vassals who were also followers of the sect, such as Ishikawa Ienari and Honda Tadakatsu, quickly abandoned the Ikkō faith of Jōdo Shinshū and stayed loyal to Ieyasu in order to confront the rebels.

On January 15, 1564, Ieyasu decided to concentrate his forces to attack and eliminate the Ikkō-ikki from Mikawa. In the Battle of Azukizaka, Ieyasu fought on the front lines and was nearly killed when he was struck by several bullets, but survived because they did not penetrate his armor. Both sides were using new gunpowder weapons which the Portuguese had introduced to Japan 20 years earlier. At the end of the battle, the Ikkō-ikki were defeated. By 1565, Ieyasu had become the master of all of Mikawa Province.

In 1566, when Ieyasu declared his independence from the Imagawa clan, he reformed the order of Mikawa province, starting with the Matsudaira clan, after he pacified Mikawa. This decision was made after he was counseled by his senior vassal Sakai Tadatsugu to abandon the clan's allegiance to the Imagawa clan. He also strengthened his power base by creating a military government system for the Tokugawa clan in Mikawa which was based on his hereditary vassals, the Fudai daimyō. The system, which was called "Sanbi no gunsei", (三備の軍制) divided governance into three sections: Hatamoto-Senshi, Higashi (eastern) Mikawa, and Nishi (western) Mikawa.

=== Tokugawa clan ===
In 1567, Ieyasu started the family name "Tokugawa", changing his name to the well-known Tokugawa Ieyasu. As a member of the Matsudaira clan, he claimed descent from the Seiwa Genji branch of the Minamoto clan. As there was no proof that the Matsudaira clan were descendants of Emperor Seiwa, the Emperor initially did not approve the appointment, citing the lack of a precedent for the Serada clan of the Seiwa Genji clan to be appointed as Mikawa-no-kami (Lord of Mikawa).

Ieyasu then consulted with imperial noble Konoe Motohisa through the mediation of a Mikawa native and the abbot of the Kyo Seiganji Temple. Due to Motohisa's efforts, Yoshida Kaneyoshi discovered a genealogical document in the Manri-koji family that provided a precedent. It said "Tokugawa (belongs) to the Minamoto clan, as another offshoot of the Fujiwara clan," and a copy was transferred to him and used for the application. Ieyasu then gained the permission of the Imperial Court and he was bestowed the courtesy title Mikawa-no-kami and the court rank of Junior 5th Rank, Lower Grade (從五位下, ju go-i no ge).

Though the Tokugawa clan could claim some modicum of freedom, they were very much subject to the requests of Oda Nobunaga. Ieyasu remained an ally of Nobunaga and his Mikawa soldiers were part of Nobunaga's army which captured Kyoto in 1568.

In 1568, at the same time, Ieyasu was eager to expand eastward to Tōtōmi Province. Ieyasu and Takeda Shingen, the head of the Takeda clan in Kai Province, made an alliance for the purpose of conquering all the territory of the Imagawa. It is said that the Tokugawa clan had made an agreement with the Takeda clan when dividing the territory that the eastern Suruga Province would become Takeda territory and the western Tōtōmi province would be Tokugawa territory, with the Ōi River as the border.

On January 8, 1569, the Takeda vassal Akiyama Nobutomo invaded the Tōtōmi province from Shinano Province. The Takeda clan, through Oda Nobunaga, with whom they had a friendly relationship, asked Ieyasu, who was Nobunaga's ally, to reconsider cooperation with the Takeda, but Ieyasu rejected the idea, demonstrating a degree of independence from Nobunaga.

=== Tōtōmi campaign ===
In 1568, Ieyasu besieged the Horikawa Castle in Tōtōmi and captured it in 1569. Ieyasu then ordered Ishikawa Hanzaburo to massacre the castle prisoners and residents, including women and children. It was recorded that around 700 people were beheaded on the banks of the Miyakoda River. Ōkubo Tadachika, who witnessed this massacre testified in his personal journal, Mikawa Monogatari, that "... both men and women can be cut into pieces [sic]...".

Later the same year, Ieyasu's troops penetrated Tōtōmi Province. Meanwhile, Takeda Shingen's troops captured Suruga Province, including the Imagawa capital of Sunpu. Imagawa Ujizane fled to Kakegawa Castle, which led Ieyasu to lay siege to Kakegawa.

Ieyasu then negotiated with Ujizane, promising that if Ujizane surrendered himself and the remainder of Tōtōmi, Ieyasu would assist Ujizane in regaining Suruga. Ujizane had nothing left to lose, and Ieyasu immediately ended his alliance with Takeda, instead making a new alliance with Takeda's enemy to the north, Uesugi Kenshin of the Uesugi clan. Through these political manipulations, Ieyasu gained the support of the samurai of Tōtōmi Province. Furthermore, Ieyasu also placed the "Iinoya's trio" (Iinoya-Sanninshu) of clans under the command of his trusted vassal, Ii Naomasa. The Iinoya trio were powerful clans that originated from the eastern side of Mikawa who greatly contributed to Ieyasu's expansion during his conquest of the former Imagawa territories in Tōtōmi Province.

In 1570, Ieyasu established Hamamatsu as the capital of his territory, placing his son Matsudaira Nobuyasu in charge of Okazaki. (Note: According to the Todai-ki, the castle was originally planned to be relocated to Mitsuke (the site where Kinosaki Castle is said to be), but was changed to Hamamatsu at the request of Oda Nobunaga. It is speculated that Nobunaga did not want the Oda and Tokugawa bases to be too far apart.)

=== Campaign against Asakura-Azai clan ===
Asakura Yoshikage, the head of the Asakura clan and regent of Ashikaga Yoshiaki, refused to come to Kyōto. This caused Nobunaga to declare both of them rebels. Several reports from Mikawa Monogatari, Nobunaga Koki, Tokugawa Jikki, and a supplement from Ietada Nikki recorded that Ieyasu and his forces also participated in Oda's punitive campaign against Asakura, in which they captured Mount Tenzutsu castle. The Oda-Tokugawa forces managed to kill 1,370 enemies on April 25.

They continued the next day by besieging Kanegasaki castle. However the Azai clan sent reinforcements to relieve the siege so Nobunaga retreated without contacting Ieyasu. After dawn, Ieyasu withdrew from battle guided by Kinoshita Tokichi (later named Toyotomi Hideyoshi), an Oda vassal.

Later, in July 1570, the brother-in-law of Nobunaga, Azai Nagamasa, who had broken his alliance with the Oda clan during the siege of Kanegasaki, and Asakura, combined to fight the combined armies of Nobunaga and Ieyasu, who led 5,000 of his men to support Nobunaga at the battle. As the Oda clan engaged the Azai clan army on the right, Tokugawa's forces engaged the Asakura clan's army on the left. At first Asakura's army gained the advantage as they steadily pushed back the Tokugawa army. However, Honda Tadakatsu suddenly launched a lone, suicidal charge, while Sakakibara Yasumasa launched his force in a timely counterattack on Asakura's flank; together they managed to beat Asakura's forces. Since Ieyasu's army was now free to move, they exploited the gap between Asakura and Azai's forces and sent Tadakatsu and Yasumasa to attack the flank of Azai's formation, which allowed the Oda-Tokugawa forces to win the battle.

=== Suruga campaign against Takeda clan ===
In October 1571, Takeda Shingen broke the alliance with the Oda-Tokugawa forces and allied with the Odawara Hōjō clan. He decided to make a drive for Kyoto at the urging of the shōgun Ashikaga Yoshiaki, starting by invading Tokugawa lands in Tōtōmi. Takeda Shingen's first objectives in his campaign against Ieyasu were Nishikawa Castle, Yoshida Castle and Futamata Castle.

In 1572, after besieging Futamata, Shingen would press on past Futamata towards the major Tokugawa home castle at Hamamatsu. Ieyasu asked for help from Nobunaga, who sent him some 3,000 troops. Early in 1573, the two armies met at the Battle of Mikatagahara, north of Hamamatsu. The considerably larger Takeda army, under the expert direction of Shingen, overwhelmed Ieyasu's troops and caused heavy casualties. Despite his initial reluctance, Ieyasu was convinced by his generals to retreat. Later in his fortress Ieyasu brazenly ordered the men in his castle to light torches, sound drums, and leave the gates open, to properly receive the returning warriors. To the surprise and relief of the Tokugawa army, this spectacle made the Takeda generals suspicious that they were being led into a trap, so they did not besiege the castle and instead made camp for the night. This error allowed a band of Tokugawa soldiers to raid the camp in the ensuing hours, further upsetting the already disoriented Takeda army, and ultimately resulting in Shingen's decision to call off the offensive altogether. Takeda Shingen would not get another chance to advance on Hamamatsu, much less Kyoto, since he died from unknown causes shortly after the siege of Noda Castle later that same year.

Around 1572 or 1573, according to various primary sources such as Shinchō Kōki, Mikawa Monogatari (三河物語), Ietada nikki (家忠日記) and Mikawa Tōdai-ki (三河東大記), Nobunaga sent a letter to the authorities in Suruga Province that he assigned Ieyasu as the controller of the province.

In 1574, Shingen was succeeded by his son Takeda Katsuyori and the conflict continued as the Tokugawa forces under Honda Tadakatsu and Sakakibara Yasumasa seized many of the Takeda clan's castles, including Komyo Castle. At some point, Ieyasu tried to capture Inui Castle in Tōtōmi Province, but strong resistance from its garrison commander, Amano Kagehira, forced Ieyasu to abort the siege. During their retreat, Kagehira launched a counterattack to pursue Ieyasu, but this was repelled by Mizuno Tadashige and Torii Mototada, who led the rearguard.

In April 1575, Ōga Yashirō, a deputy governor of over 20 villages in Oku district of Mikawa under Matsudaira Nobuyasu, was arrested by Ōkubo Tadayo and paraded around Hamamatsu Castle. According to the investigation, Yashirō was implicated in allegations of colluding with Takeda Katsuyori to betray Ieyasu and invade the Tokugawa clan's territory. According to a letter, Yashiro had teamed up with Takeda Katsuyori of Kai to seize Okazaki Castle. However, one of Yashiro's colleagues, Yamada Hachizō, betrayed Yashiro and passed this information to Nobuyasu. Meanwhile, Ieyasu himself also learned about Yashirō's further crimes of corruption in governance through a vassal's report. Yashirō was then executed by being mutilated alive with a saw, while Tadayo crucified his wife and children.

In June, during Takeda Katsuyori's raid on Mikawa Province when he attacked Yoshida Castle and besieged Nagashino Castle, Ieyasu appealed to Nobunaga for help; Nobunaga came personally with 30,000 men. The Oda-Tokugawa forces 38,000 strong won a great victory and successfully defended Nagashino Castle. Though the Takeda forces had been destroyed, Katsuyori survived the battle and retreated to Kai Province. For the next seven years, Ieyasu and Katsuyori fought a series of small battles through which Ieyasu's troops managed to wrest control of Suruga Province from the Takeda clan.

=== Nobuyasu Incident ===
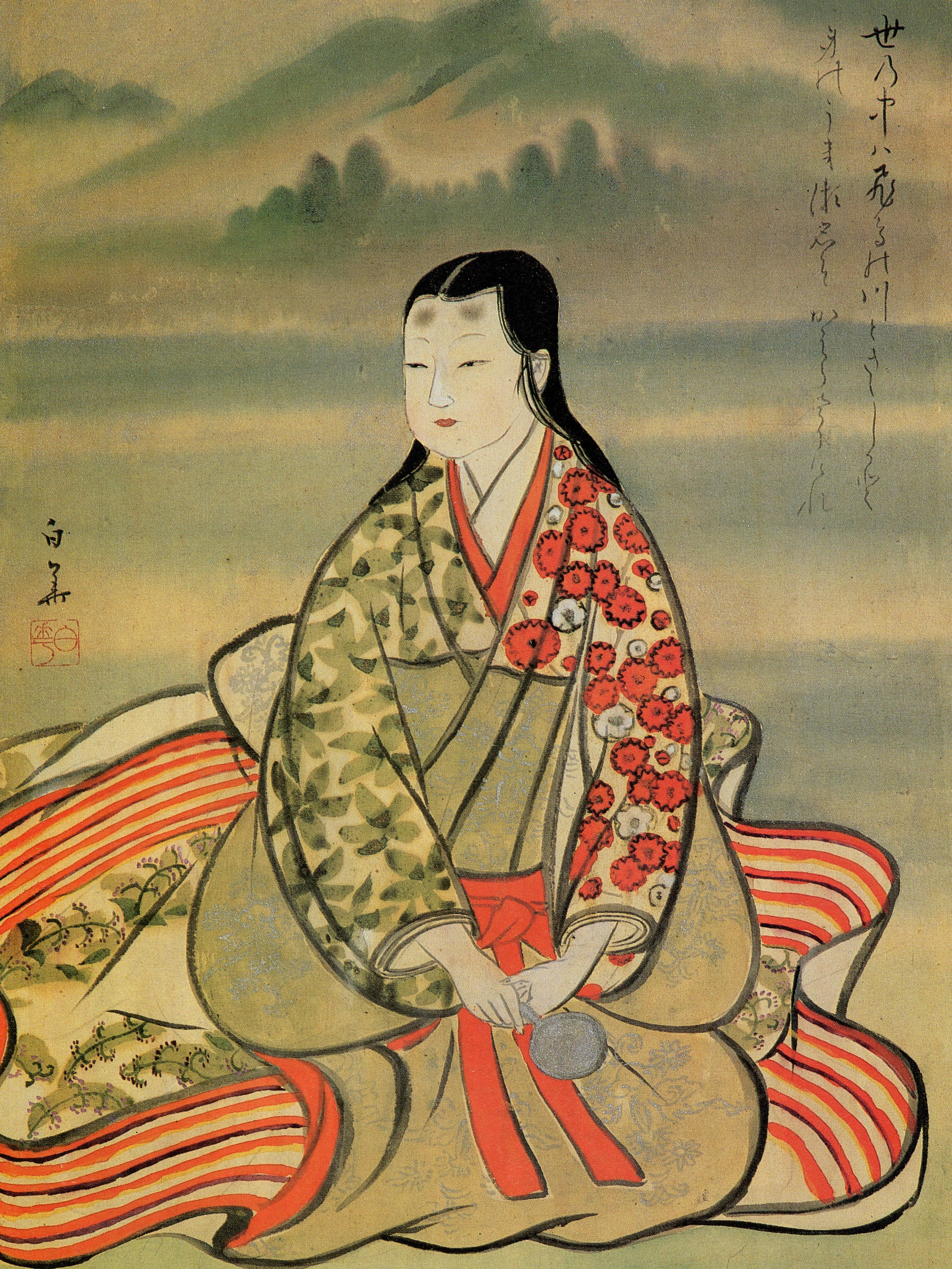
Tsukiyama-Dono, wife of Ieyasu who was executed due to an accusation of treason

In 1579, Lady Tsukiyama, Ieyasu's wife, and his heir Matsudaira Nobuyasu were accused by Nobunaga of conspiring with Takeda Katsuyori to assassinate Nobunaga, whose daughter Tokuhime was married to Nobuyasu. Ieyasu ordered his wife to be executed and forced his son to commit seppuku because of these accusations.

There are various theories regarding this incident. According to the "Mikawa Monogatari'", which was written by Ōkubo Tadachika, Tokuhime, wife of Nobuyasu, who was not on good terms with her mother-in-law Tsukiyama-dono, wrote in a letter to her father, Nobunaga, that her mother-in-law and her husband were secretly conspiring with Takeda Katsuyori.

However, this hypothesis has been considered implausible by various historians in the modern era. According to Katsuhiro Taniguchi, the more plausible theory was that there was friction within the Tokugawa clan between two factions with conflicting ideals, as proposed by the writer Tenkyu Goro. One faction, dubbed the "Hamamatsu Castle Faction," was active on the front lines and had many opportunities to advance their careers. The other faction was the "Okazaki Castle Faction," which consisted of Tokugawa vassals responsible for logistical support due to past injuries and other factors that caused them to play a lesser role in the politics of Tokugawa clan. According to this theory, the conflict between these two factions eventually led to a conflict between Ieyasu, representing the Hamamatsu faction, and his son Nobuyasu, representing the Okazaki faction, finally ending with Nobuyasu's death in prison. Nobuyasu planned to exile Ieyasu with the help of the Okazaki Castle faction. Before and after his son's execution, Ieyasu punished or executed many of those who worked at Okazaki Castle, although some escaped. Taniguchi theorized that Tsukiyama also participated in the coup d'état that was going on in Okazaki Castle. Furthermore, Sakai Tadatsugu, the most prominent general of Ieyasu, also may have played a role in confirming Oda Nobunaga's suspicion of the alleged betrayal against the Oda clan being planned by Nobuyasu Tsukiyama. Ieyasu may have concluded that if a high-ranking fudai daimyō such as Tadatsugu had confirmed the accusations against Lady Tsukiyama, then they must be true.

Another theory has said that Tadatsugu was actually conspiring with Ieyasu's mother, Odai no Kata, to get rid of Lady Tsukiyama. Arthur Lindsay Sadler theorized this was a deliberate act of spite from Tadatsugu due to many senior Tokugawa clan generals' dislike of Nobuyasu.

In the same year, Ieyasu named his third son, Tokugawa Hidetada, as his heir, since his second son had been adopted by Toyotomi Hideyoshi, who would later become a powerful daimyo.

=== Takeda clan annihilation ===
Positions of the Takatenjin Castle and the six forts 1.Ogasayama Fort, 2.Nogasaka Fort, 3.Higamine Fort,4. Shishigahana Fort, 5.Nakamura Fort, 6.'Mitsuiyama Fort, 7.Takatenjin Castle

In 1580, Ieyasu built five fortresses in order to isolate Takatenjin Castle from external supplies and reinforcements. In addition to those five new fortresses, Ieyasu renovated an old castle named Ogasayama fort, which had originally been built by Ieyasu long before the conquest of Tōtōmi Province, against the Imagawa clan to capture Kakegawa Castle. With the six fortresses, which were referred to as the "six fortresses of Takatenjin", completed, Ieyasu assigned Ishikawa Yasumichi to the Ogasayama fort, Honda Yasushige to the Nogasaka fort, Osuga Yasutaka to the Higamine, Shishigahana, and Nakamura forts, while Sakai Ietada was appointed to garrison the Mitsuiyama fort.

The Takatenjin castle, which was defended by Okabe Motonobu, immediately suffered from a period of starvation as the siege by Oda-Tokugawa forces intensified. In response, Motonobu tried to negotiate a truce with Ieyasu by offering Takisakai and Koyama Castle in exchange for Takatenjin castle being spared from the siege. After Ieyasu consulted with Nobunaga on this matter, he refused Motonobu's plea. Nobunaga stated his reason in a letter saying that if Takeda Katsuyori sent his forces to assist Motonobu, then there would be an opportunity to bait the Takeda army into coming outside the castle then annihilating them on the field. Meanwhile, Nobunaga also stated that if Katsuyori neglected helping Motonobu at all, it would damage the Takeda clan's credibility because they could not save their own vassals.

In 1581, Ieyasu forces managed to subdue Tanaka castle, and recapture Takatenjin castle, where Okabe Motonobu was killed during the fight.

The end of the war with Takeda Katsuyori came in 1582, when a combined Oda-Tokugawa force attacked and conquered Kai Province, where Katsuyori was cornered and defeated at the Battle of Tenmokuzan, and then committed seppuku. With the Takeda clan practically annihilated as a political entity, Nobunaga gave Ieyasu the right to govern Suruga Province in recognition of his service in the fight against the Takeda clan.

== Tokugawa expansions (1582–1584) ==
In late June 1582, before the incident at Honnō-ji temple, Oda Nobunaga invited Ieyasu to tour the Kansai region in celebration of the demise of the Takeda clan. Before the meeting could take place, Ieyasu learned that Nobunaga had killed himself at Honnō-ji temple after being surrounded and overwhelmed by the forces of Akechi Mitsuhide.

=== "Shinkun Iga-goe" journey ===
When Ieyasu heard that Nobunaga had been killed by Akechi Mitsuhide he had only a few companions with him, notably Sakai Tadatsugu, Ii Naomasa, Honda Tadakatsu, Sakakibara Yasumasa and some others. The Iga provincial route was dangerous because of the Ochimusha-gari, or "Samurai hunters" gangs. (Note: During the Sengoku period, particularly dangerous groups called "Ochimusha-gari" or "fallen warrior hunter" groups had emerged. These groups consisted of peasants or rōnin who had been dispossessed by war and now formed self-defense forces which operated outside the law, while in reality they often resorted to hunting and robbing defeated Samurai or soldiers during conflicts. These outlaw groups were particularly rampant on the route which Ieyasu taken to return to Mikawa.) Ieyasu and his party, therefore, chose the shortest route back to Mikawa Province by crossing Iga Province. The exact route differs in many versions according to primary sources Tokugawa Nikki or Mikawa Todai-Hon:

- The Tokugawa Nikki theory stated that Ieyasu took the roads to Shijonawate and Son'enji, then followed the Kizu River until they spent a night in the Yamaguchi Castle. The next day they reached a stronghold of the Kōka ikki clan branch from Tarao who allowed them to take refuge for the night. On the last day, Ieyasu's group used a ship from Shiroko to reach Okazaki Castle. However, The Tokugawa Nikki theory is doubted by modern historians, since it was not the shortest route for Ieyasu to reach Mikawa from his starting position in Sakai, and it was considered by historical researchers to be a very risky path due to the existence of Iga ikki clans which were hostile to the Oda and Tokugawa clans.
- The Mikawa Toda-Hon theory stated that Ieyasu went north from Ogawadate, crossed Koka, and entered Seishu Seki (from Shigaraki), passing through Aburahi and entering Tsuge in Iga. This theory was championed by modern Japanese historians such as Tatsuo Fujita from Mie University, who took this material to formulate three different theories about the details of Ieyasu's trek. This theory is also supported by a group of historical researchers from Mie city, who happened to be descendants of the Kōka ikki clans. The researchers stated that by taking this path, before Ieyasu's group reached Kada pass where they could be escorted by the Kōka clan Jizamurai, Ieyasu mostly depended on the protection of his high-rank vassals, particularly the four Shitennō generals of the Tokugawa clan, rather than the popular theory about getting help from the "Iga Ninja" clans.

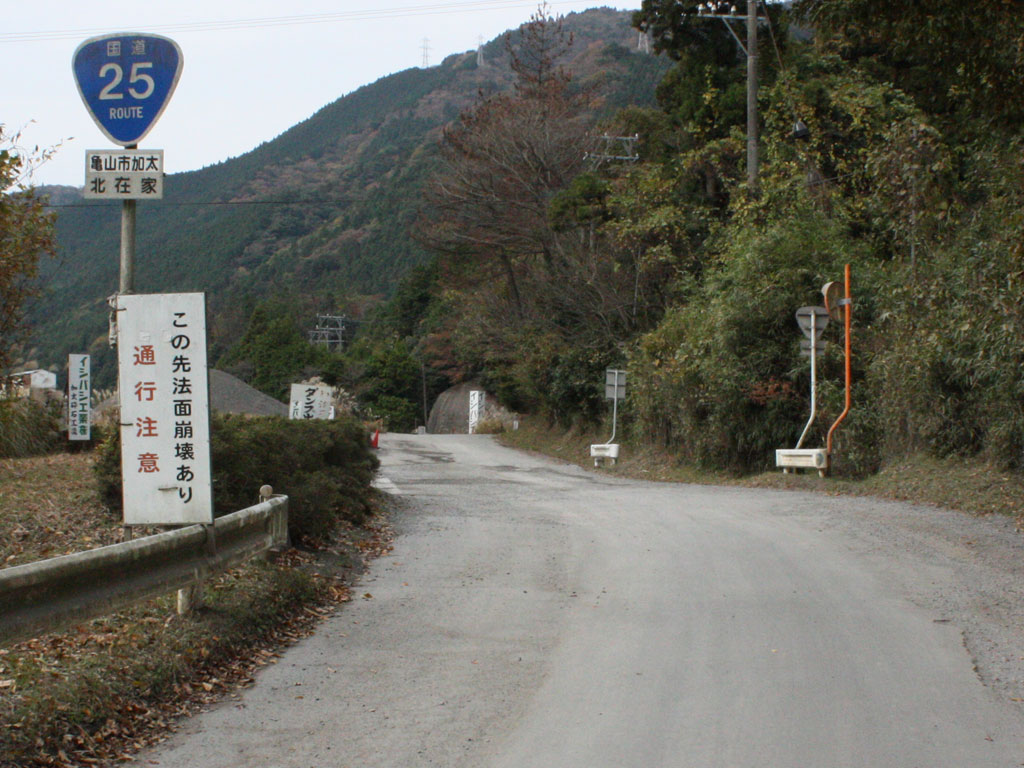
Kada pass, believed to be the road which taken by Tokugawa Ieyasu to return into Mikawa province.

Regardless which theory was true, historians agreed that when his path ended at Kada (a mountain pass between Kameyama and Iga), the Tokugawa group suffered one last attack by Ochimusha-gari outlaws as they reached the territory of Kōka ikki clans of Jizamurai who were friendly to the Tokugawa clan. The Koka ikki samurais assisted Ieyasu in eliminating the threat of the Ochimusha-gari outlaws and escorted them until they reached Iga Province, where they were further protected by other allied clans from Iga ikki who accompanied Ieyasu and his group until they safely reached Mikawa.

Portuguese missionary Luís Fróis recorded in his work History of Japan that during this journey, Tokugawa retainers including Sakai Tadatsugu, Ii Naomasa and Honda Tadakatsu fought their way out of raids and harassment from Ochimusha-gari outlaws while escorting Ieyasu, while paying bribes of gold and silver to those Ochimusha-gari outlaws that could be bribed. Matsudaira Ietada recorded in his journal, Ietada nikki (家忠日記), the Ieyasu's escorts suffered around 200 casualties during their journey, and when they arrived at Ietada's residence in Mikawa, they only had about 34 personnel left, including high-ranking Tokugawa generals including Tadatsugu, Naomasa, Tadakatsu, Sakakibara, Ōkubo Tadayo, Hattori Hanzō, and others.

=== Tenshō-Jingo war ===
After Ieyasu reached Mikawa, he immediately moved to shift his focus to former Takeda clan territory as he expected unrest there. As a preemptive measure, Ieyasu dispatched Honda Nobutoshi to contact Kawajiri Hidetaka, who ruled Suwa District as a vassal of the Oda clan, to request cooperation.

Meanwhile, Ieyasu had Yoda Nobushige, the former Takeda clan governor of the Saku district who had been hidden in the Tokugawa territory and had maintained contact with Ieyasu, organize contacts with the other remaining vassals of the Takeda clan to restore order in the chaos following the death of Nobunaga. At that moment, Nobushige was settled in the secluded village of Osawa. At the same time, Uesugi and the Hōjō clans also mobilized their forces to invade Shinano Province, Kōzuke Province, and Kai Province (currently Gunma Prefecture), which were ruled by the remnants of the many small clans that formerly served the Takeda clan, when they learned of the death of Nobunaga. This caused a triangular conflict between those three factions known as the Tenshō-Jingo War (天正壬午の乱, Tenshō-Jingo no ran). (Note: The name of "Tenshō-Jingo War" was coined by Tashiro Takashi in 1980. Furthermore, there is also a theory that from the perspective that local powers which continued to fight over the possession of the Oda clan's leftover territories, there is evidence that Tokugawa Ieyasu's transfer to the Kantō region following the fall of the Hōjō clan in 1590 and the placement of Toyotomi-line daimyo, until transfer of Uesugi Kagekatsu to Aizu, where the local daimyo were separated from their former territory and the establishment of control by the Azuchi–Momoyama period, was considered to be the extension of this conflict.)

==== Preliminary movements ====
At first, the Hōjō clan, who ruled the Kantō region, led an army of 55,000 men to invade the Shinano Province through Usui, as they aimed to prevent a Tokugawa incursion of Kai. By June 13, 1582, the Hōjō clan had captured Iwadono Castle in Tsuru District and instructed Watanabe Shozaemon, a local magistrate from the Tsuru District, to assist them in their conquest. Subsequently, Sanada Masayuki led his army and captured the Numata Castle for the Uesugi clan.

Meanwhile, Ieyasu immediately marched his 8,000 soldiers to the disputed regions and then split his army into two parts, with the separate detachment led by Sakai Tadatsugu and Ogasawara Nobumine going to pacify the Shinano Province, while Ieyasu took the main force to pacify Kai. Tadatsugu and Nobumine met with unexpected resistance from Suwa Yoritada, a former Takeda vassal who was now allied with the Hōjō clan. They were beaten by Yoritada, who were then reinforced by the Hōjō clan, forcing Tadatsugu to retreat. As Tadatsugu's forces retreated, they were pursued by 43,000 men of the Hōjō clan army. Okabe Masatsuna, a member of the Suruga clan samurai who once served under Baba Nobuharu, took the initiative to defend the rear of Tadatsugu's army from the enemy charges and repelled them. As they successfully retreated without further losses, they rejoined Ieyasu's main forces in the area of Wakamiko in Suwamachi (modern day Yamanashi Prefecture).

On June 5, Ieyasu instructed Orii Tsugumasa and Yonekura Tadatsugu, two members of Takekawa clan from Kai who were hiding in Kiriyama, Tōtōmi Province, to proceed with the work of enticing the Kai samurai to the Tokugawa side. The next day, Ieyasu also sent a letter to Masatsuna instructing him to begin the construction of a castle at Shimoyama, Minobu Town in the Kai Kawachi domain, the former base of Anayama Nobutada, one of Tokugawa's retainers who was killed by outlaws during his escape after the Honnō-ji Incident. Suganuma Castle (Terazawa, Minobu Town) was built along the Fuji River and the Suruga Highway (Kawachi Road). After the death of Nobutada and the senior members of the Obikane clan, to which they had pledged loyalty, the Anayama clan was left leaderless, so they decided to pledge allegiance to Ieyasu.

Ieyasu then dispatched Sone Masatada, formerly one of Shingen Takeda's three most prominent generals, (Note: the other two were said to be Yamagata Masakage and Sanada Masayuki.) to the Erinji area with 500 men to confront a Hōjō force that numbered 3,000 men. Masatada managed to defeat them and inflicted between 600 and 700 casualties. On June 12, Masatada joined forces with another former Takeda vassal, Okabe Masatsuna, and a senior Tokugawa general, Osuga Yasutaka. The same day, Yoda Nobushige set off to Saku District and rallied around 3,000 Takeda clan retainers as Ieyasu instructed.

Later on June 28, Ieyasu also dispatched the Anayama clan to resist the Hōjō clan. He also sent his generals Ōkubo Tadayo, Ishikawa Yasumichi and Honda Hirotaka along with his son Yasushige as reinforcements for them to resist the Hōjō.

At some point during this war, the Tokugawa clan also gained support from the Tomohisa clan. (Note: The Tomohisa clan was a powerful clan that ruled the Ryuto area (left bank of the Tenryu River) in Shimoina during the medieval era. They were originally from Chikuzawa (modern day Minowa Town, Kamiina District, Nagano) and were said to be one of the branches of the Suwa clan. During the Tensho-Jingo war, the Tomohisa was the ruler of Chikudaira Castle, located in Chikudaira, Shimo-Kuken, Iida City.)

Uesugi Kagekatsu of the Uesugi clan also made his move by supporting former Takeda clan forces under the leadership of Ogasawara Dōsetsusai from the Ogasawara clan and Yashiro Hidemasa at Chikuma and the Nishina clan of Azumino. They defeated and expelled Kiso Yoshimasa, who had been granted the control of both Chikuma and Azumino by Oda Nobunaga. They then faced another branch of Ogasawara clan which was led by Ogasawara Sadayoshi and his retainers which opposed the steps taken by Dōsetsusai. Sadayoshi's group appealed to the Tokugawa clan and offered their allegiance to Ieyasu. On June 24, Kagekatsu advanced into northern Shinano and entered Naganuma castle.

As the triangular battle was underway between the three factions, order was restored in Owari province as the rebellion of Akechi Mitsuhide had already been suppressed in the Battle of Yamazaki. Ieyasu also informed the Oda clan of the developments in Shinano and Kai. In response, on July 7, as the Oda clan learned of the defeat of Takigawa Kazumasu by the Hōjō clan at the Battle of Kanagawa, Toyotomi Hideyoshi sent a letter to Ieyasu to give him authorization to lead military operations to secure the two provinces of Kai and Shinano from the Hōjō and Uesugi clans. (Note: Ieyasu's position and actions here are not those of an independent feudal lord, but as a feudal lord under the Oda regime, with the aim of defeating the Hojo clan)

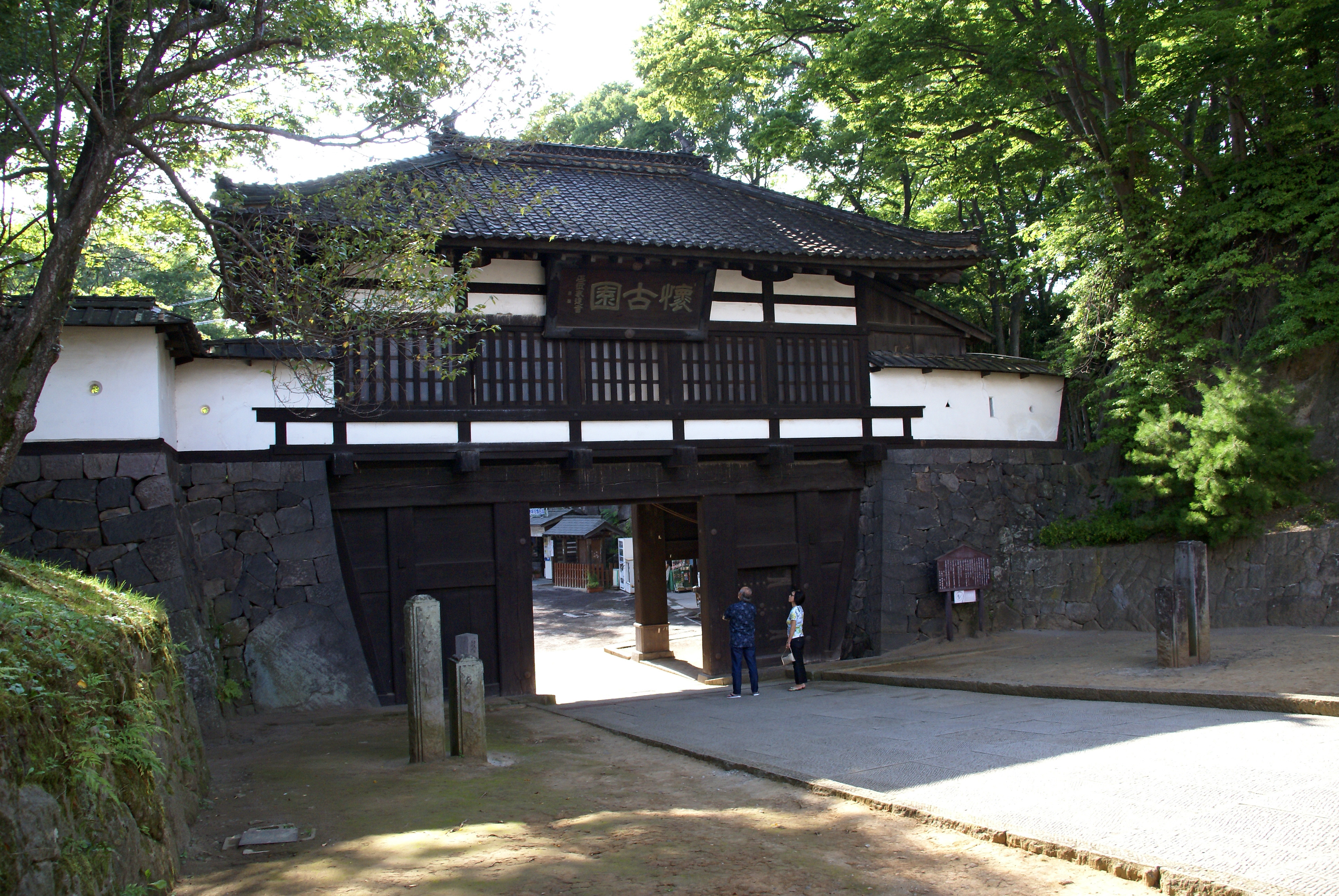
Komoro castle

=== Aftermath of Tenshō-Jingo war ===
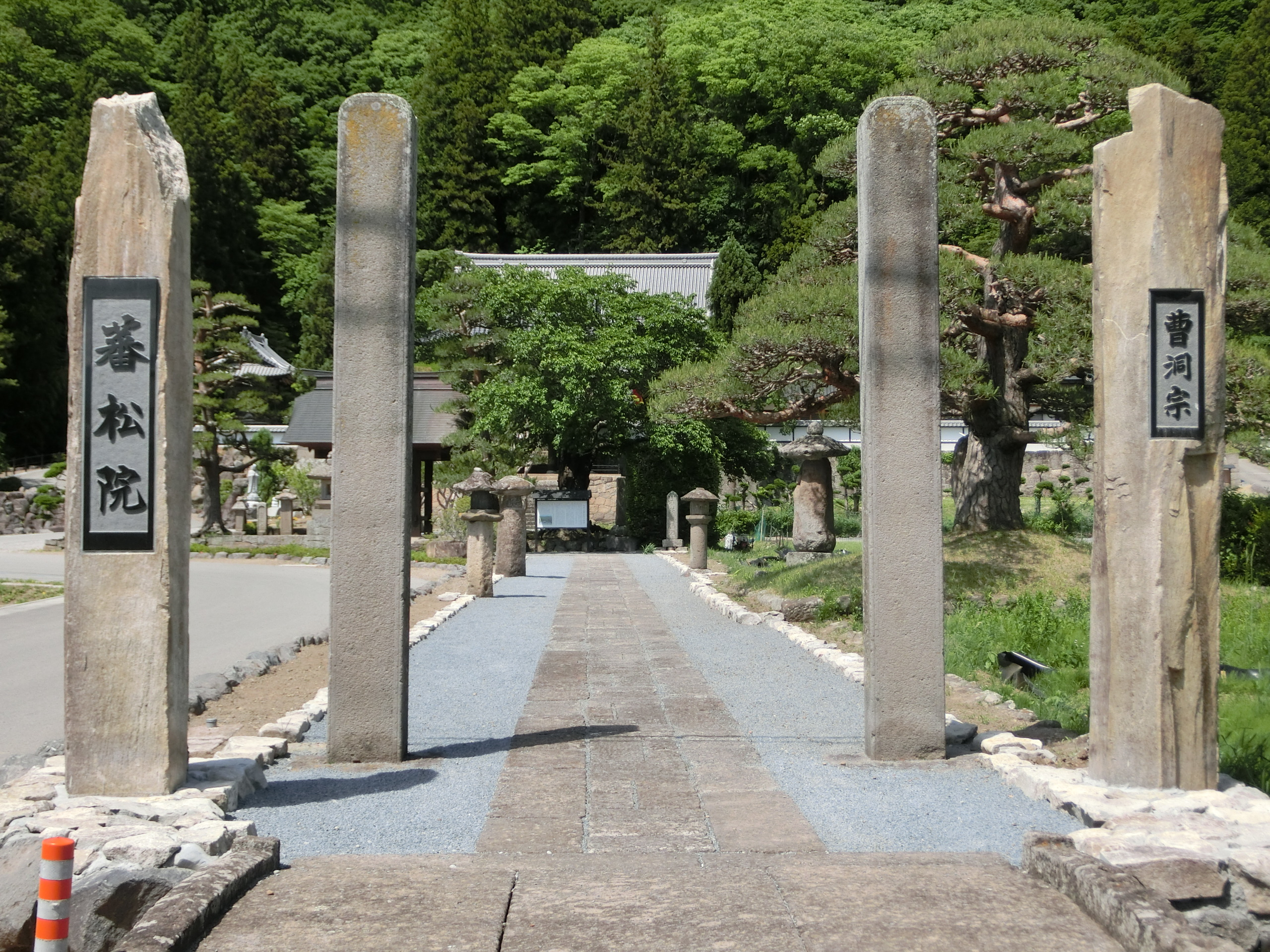
Grave of Yoda Nobushige, former Takeda clan general and benefactor of Ieyasu during the Tenshō-Jingo War.

The problems for the Hōjō clan increased by the day as Ieyasu established contact with daimyo lords from north-east Japan including the Satake, Yuki, and Utsunomiya clans, who threatened to invade the Hōjō from behind while the Hōjō were still engaging Ieyasu in battle. As the war turned in favor of Ieyasu, combined with the defection of Sanada Masayuki to the Tokugawa side, the Hōjō negotiated a truce with Ieyasu.

The Hōjō clan sent Hōjō Ujinobu as representative, while the Tokugawa sent Ii Naomasa as representative for the preliminary meetings. Representatives from the Oda clan, Oda Nobukatsu, Oda Nobutaka, and Toyotomi Hideyoshi who mediated the negotiation from October 1582, also assisted the ratification of the truce. Sanada Nobutada, a younger brother of Sanada Masayuki, was given 5,000 koku of territory by Ieyasu, and Okabe Masatsuna was rewarded with a 7,600 koku domain in between Kai and Shinano provinces. In the aftermath of the war, Ieyasu once again sent Tadatsugu to subdue Suwa Yoritada at Suwa in Shinano in December, where Tadatsugu defeated Yoritada and secured his surrender to the Tokugawa clan.

In March 1583, according to the Meishō genkō-roku record, after the destruction of the Takeda clan in the Tenmokuzan, Ieyasu organized a kishōmon (blood oath) with many samurai clans, local lords, low rank officials, ninja mercenaries, and even noble ladies that were formerly vassals of the Takeda clan in order to put them under the command of Tokugawa clan retainers. Since the ritual took place after the Tenshō-Jingo war and in the same location, this oath taking ritual was named Tenshō-Jingo kishōmon. During the process of the oath-taking Tokugawa, Ieyasu planned to give control of most of the former Takeda samurai to Ii Naomasa to command, having consulted and reached agreement with Sakai Tadatsugu, a senior Tokugawa clan vassal. However, Ieyasu's decision garnered protest from Sakakibara Yasumasa, who went so far as to threaten Naomasa. Tadatsugu immediately defended Ieyasu's decision in response and warned Yasumasa that if he did any harm to Naomasa, Tadatsugu would personally slaughter the Sakakibara clan; Yasumasa backed down and did not protest further. As there were no more protests, Ieyasu decided to assign the new recruits to various commands, as following:

- 70 former Takeda samurai from Tsuchiya clan, and also the clan of Ishiguro Shōgen to Ii Naomasa. (another source mentioned that total of 120 Takeda samurai warriors came under the command of Naomasa.)
- 11 former Takeda samurai from Komai clan led by Komai Masanao to Sakakibara Yasumasa.
- 60 former Takeda samurai of Asari clan led by Asari Masatane to Honda Tadakatsu.
- The largest number of Takeda clans vassals were under the direct control of Ieyasu himself, including clans which were led by Yoda Nobushige or Hoshina Masanao (along with the local daimyo lords from Shinano who followed Masanao)., the Kurihara to Kurihara Nobumori, 49 samurai from the Jō clan led by father and son Jō Kageshige and Jō Masashige, samurai who formerly guarded the frontiers of Takeda clan led Watanabe Hitoyanosuke, and many others. Among those who were assigned as Hatamoto, or direct vassal of Ieyasu, they were allowed to retain their positions, and even increased the revenue from the domains they controlled, particularly from the new territories which the Tokugawa clan conquered. This was apparent from the Saegusa clan, where the son of the clan leader, Saegusa Masayoshi, retained his territory, while his father Saegusa Torayoshi was appointed as one of four magistrates in the Tokugawa clan.

Aside from the already established workforces from the former Takeda clan, Ieyasu also established new offices such as the Hachiōji sen'nin-dōshin, which formed from a patchwork membership of nine small clans of Takeda retainers. This group continued to serve the Tokugawa clan faithfully until they were disbanded during the Meiji Restoration in 1868. (Note: At first, their members were 250 men. Later expanded to 500 after Ieyasu transferred into the Kantō region. Later, they were appointed as guardians of Hachiōji castle, and their memberships expanded from 500 to 1,000. This is why they were called "Hachiōji sen'nin-dōshin" (Hachiōji's 1,000 officers.)

In 1583, Ieyasu had a detachment of Ii Naomasa's troops conquer the Takatō area of Shinano, which had still not submitted to the Tokugawa clan. Meanwhile, Nobushige led the attack against the Tomono clan, and defeated them.

In the middle of operation, Yoda Nobushige was killed in action. Yoda Yasukuni, who succeeded him as head of the Yoda clan, was given the surname Matsudaira and Komoro Castle. The territory he was allowed to inherit was 60,000 koku, one of the largest for any of Ieyasu's vassals at the time. Yashiro Hidemasa, who surrendered to Ogasawara Sadayoshi, also joined the Tokugawa clan later on April 1, 1584, together with his younger brother Ogasawara Mitsutoshi.

Ieyasu did not take a side during the Toyotomi Hideyoshi and Shibata Katsuie conflict, where Hideyoshi defeated Katsuie at the Battle of Shizugatake.

== Ieyasu and Hideyoshi (1584–1598) ==
=== Earthquakes and conflict with Hideyoshi ===
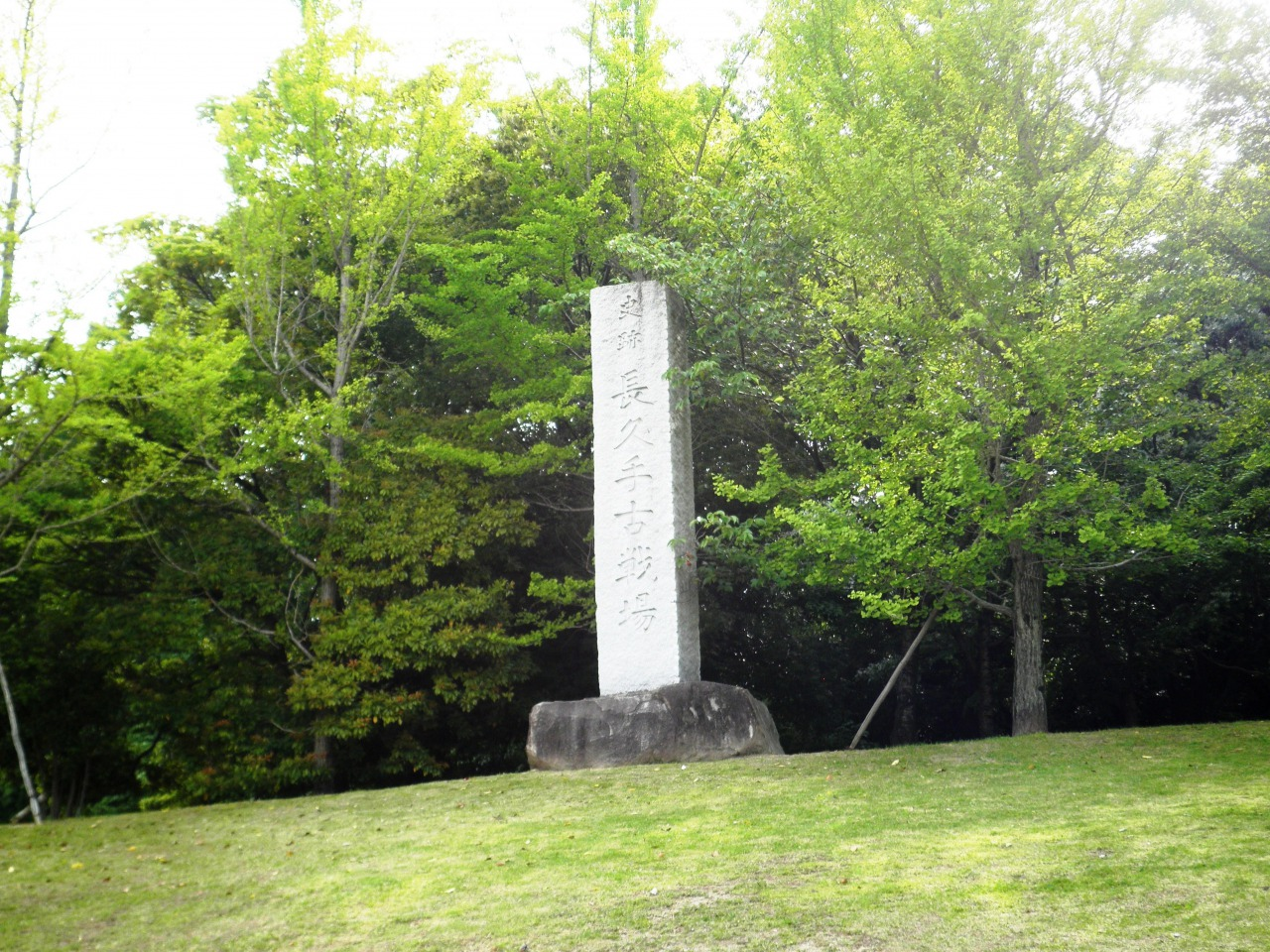
Nagakute Historic Battlefield located in Aichi Prefecture

As the Tokugawa clan's territory expanded, many of their regions were hit by earthquakes and heavy rains from 1583 to 1584. In particular, from May to July, heavy rains fell constantly from the Kantō region to the Tōkai region, in what was dubbed the "heaviest flood in 50 years" in the historical record of Ietada-nikki. It was under these circumstances that the Tokugawa clan was forced to fight against the Hōjō clan and the Toyotomi government, because in 1584 Ieyasu had decided to support Oda Nobukatsu, the eldest surviving son and heir of Oda Nobunaga, against Toyotomi Hideyoshi. The Ryumonji Kojiki, written by successive chief priests at Ryumonji Temple in Tahara, Mikawa Province, records that in 1582 many people were mobilized in the Battle of Komaki and Nagakute, which led to the devastation of farmland and famine.

The devastation of the Tokugawa clan's territory made it difficult to continue fighting against the Toyotomi government and they were forced to rebuild their country. This was a dangerous situation for the Tokugawa clan which could have resulted in their annihilation due to the Oda clan collapsing after Nobunaga's death.

Tokugawa troops took the traditional Oda stronghold of Owari. Hideyoshi responded by sending an army into Owari. Ieyasu decided to confront Hideyoshi's forces in Komaki because his general, Sakakibara Yasumasa, suggested the area was favorable for the Tokugawa force to fight incoming enemies from the west. Additionally, Ieyasu and Nobukatsu formed an anti-Hideyoshi alliance with Chōsokabe Motochika, through contact with Kōsokabe Chikayasu.

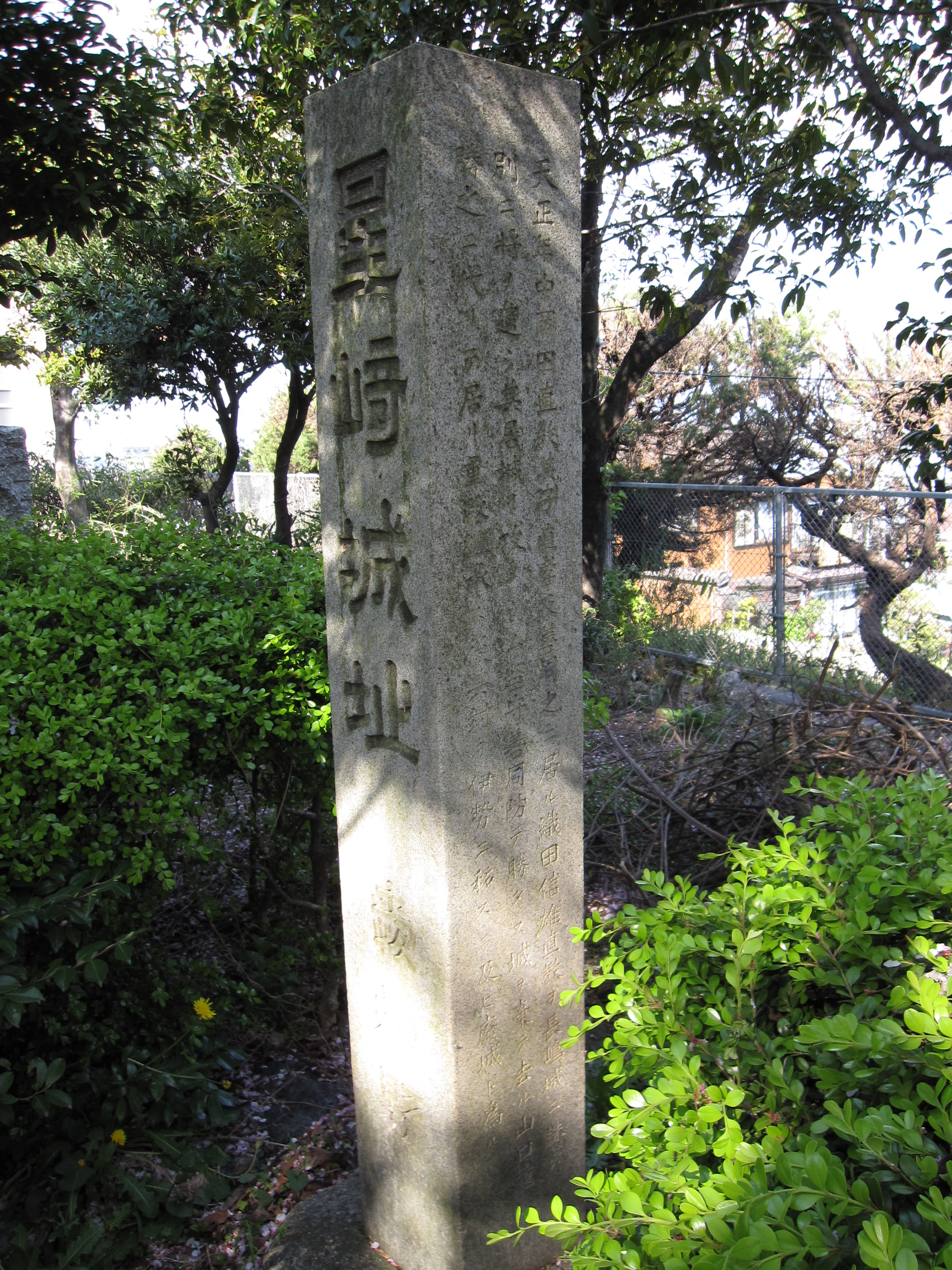
Stone memorial stele on the former site with brief description of the history of Hoshizaki castle (2009)

At first, Ieyasu ordered his generals Mizuno Tadashige and Mizuno Katsunari to capture Hoshizaki Castle. Then, as the Toyotomi army vanguard under the command of Toyotomi Hidetsugu started entering the area of Komaki, Ieyasu sent Yasumasa and Osuga Yasutaka in for a surprise attack and inflicted heavy losses on the Hidetsugu army before they were stopped by Hori Hidemasa. Hidemasa decided to retreat when Ieyasu brought his main forces forward.

Later, as another Toyotomi vanguard led by Mori Nagayoshi entered the area, Ieyasu had his senior generals, Sakai Tadatsugu, Okudaira Nobumasa, and Matsudaira Ietada, beat Nagayoshi's troops, forcing him to retreat. In the last phase of this series of engagements, Nagayoshi returned with another Toyotomi general Ikeda Tsuneoki. However, both of them were repeatedly beaten on the field at Nagakute by Mizuno Katsunari, and later, Ii Naomasa, caused the Toyotomi forces to suffer heavy losses with both Tsuneoki and Nagayoshi killed in action.

Furious with the decimation of Nagayoshi's and Tsuneoki's forces, Hideyoshi mobilized his main army to crush Ieyasu's army in Nagakute. However, Ieyasu had already retreated before Hideyoshi's main forces arrived.

After the Battle of Komaki and Nagakute in April, the front line in northern Owari reached a stalemate. At this time, Kanie Castle was located about three miles between Ieyasu's Kiyosu Castle and Nobuo's Nagashima Castle, and was connected to the Mie moat and three castles: Ono Castle, Shimojima Castle, and Maeda Castle. At that time, Kanie Castle was facing the sea and was one of the leading ports in Owari, along with Atsuta and Tsushima. Then on June 18, Ieyasu and Nobuo led 20,000 soldiers and besieged three castles: Kanie Castle, Maeda Castle, and Shimojima Castle. Kanie Castle was defended by Maeda Nagatane and Takigawa Kazumasu. Tadatsugu, Okanabe Mori, and Yamaguchi Shigemasa spearheaded the attack towards Shimojima castle, while Sakakibara Yasumasa, Osuga Yasutaka were deployed to capture any fleeing defenders.

During this siege, Ieyasu's hatamoto retainers, including Mizuno Katsunari, blockaded the port of the castle and hijacked two ships belonging to Kuki Yoshitaka to prevent any outside help for Kanie Castle. After the fall of Shimojima castle on June 22, Oda Nobuo and Tokugawa Ieyasu launched an all-out attack on Kanie Castle. The soldiers led by Tadatsugu, who had been deployed at the main gate, were exhausted after days of fierce fighting, and in the evening, the soldiers of Yasumasa Sakakibara and Ietada Matsudaira entered Kaimonjiguchi in their place. On June 23, Ieyasu entered the castle with Sakakibara Yasumasa, subduing the castle.

=== Becoming a vassal of the Toyotomi Regency ===
The conflict with Hideyoshi was long, and lasted until Nobukatsu decided to surrender to Hideyoshi. With this, Ieyasu lost his motivation to further oppose Hideyoshi and decided to also submit. After peace negotiations between Tokugawa Ieyasu and Toyotomi Hideyoshi in the aftermath of the Battle of Komaki and Nagakute, Naomasa, Tadakatsu, and Yasumasa gained fame in Kyoto. The following month, the three of them were joined by Tadatsugu Sakai while accompanying Ieyasu on a trip to Kyoto, where the four of them became famous.

However, on November 13, 1585, Ishikawa Kazumasa defected from Ieyasu to Hideyoshi. Ogasawara Sadayoshi, who also defected and followed Kazumasa, led over 3,000 troops to attack Takato. In Takato Castle there were only 40 cavalrymen and 360 soldiers other than the elderly Hoshina Masatoshi, but Masatoshi himself took command and defeated the Ogasawara forces in open battle. This prevented the collapse of Tokugawa rule in Shinano and Ieyasu awarded Masanao with the sword of Tsunehisa on December 24 in recognition of his military achievements.

These incidents caused Ieyasu to undertake massive reforms of the Tokugawa clan governmental structure by incorporating more Takeda clan vassals into his administrations, both civil and military. At first, Ieyasu ordered Torii Mototada, who served as the county magistrate of Kai, to collect military laws, weapons, and military equipment from the time of Takeda Shingen and bring them to Hamamatsu Castle in Hamamatsu City, Shizuoka Prefecture. Later, he appointed two former Takeda vassals, Naruse Masakazu and Okabe Masatsuna, as magistrates under authority of Ii Naomasa and Honda Tadakatsu. He ordered all former Takeda vassals who served him to impart any military doctrines and structures they knew from their service to the Takeda clan., He ordered three of his prime generals, Ii Naomasa, Honda Tadakatsu, and Sakakibara Yasumasa, to serve as the supreme commanders of these new military regiments. The same year, Hideyoshi forced his younger sister Asahi no kata to divorce her husband, who then committed suicide, and sent her to Ieyasu with the offer of marrying her.

In 1586, in response to Ishikawa Kazumasa's defection from the Tokugawa clan, former Takeda clan vassals from Kai and Shinano province, including Yonekura Tadatsugu, sought to reaffirm their loyalty to Ieyasu by presenting their family members as hostages.

Later the same year, Hideyoshi sent his own mother as a hostage to Ieyasu. If Ieyasu continued to refuse to go to Kyoto after such a gesture, it would give Hideyoshi a just cause for war. Ieyasu finally decided to become Hideyoshi's vassal.

=== Ruling Kantō and suppressing rebellions ===
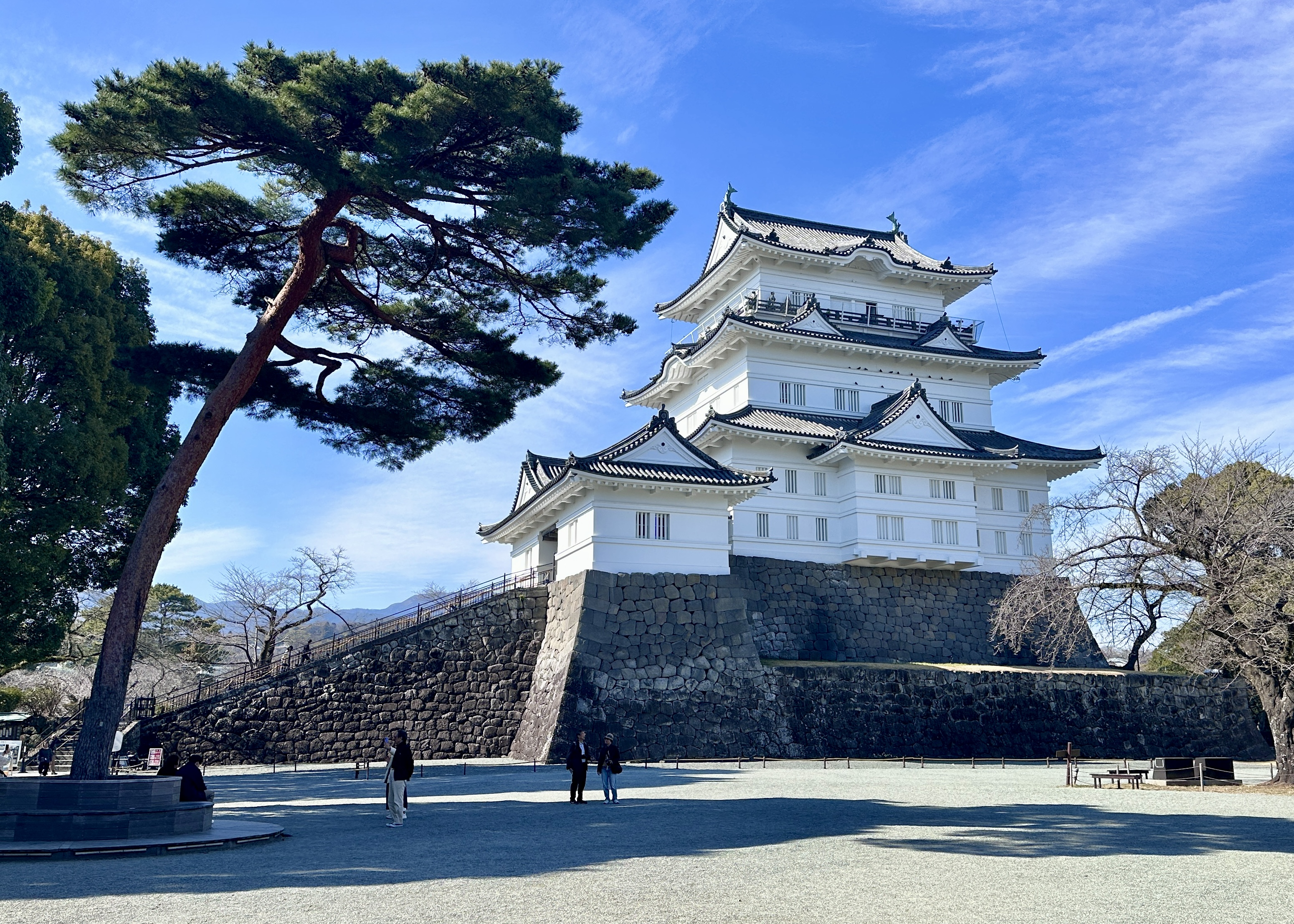
Odawara castle in 2024

In 1590 May, Ieyasu participated in the campaign against the Hōjō clan. Odawara, which was the last Hōjō clan stronghold, saw almost no significant military action, with the exception of Ii Naomasa's night raid attack. This happened after a group of miners from Kai Province dug under the castle walls, allowing troops under Naomasa to enter and engage the enemy. After the surrender of the Hōjō clan, Ieyasu sent Naomasa and Sakakibara Yasumasa with 1,500 soldiers to witness the seppuku of the defeated enemy generals, Hōjō Ujimasa and Hōjō Ujiteru. As result of his distinguished service during the campaign, Naomasa was awarded with an increase in his domain to 120,000 koku. Daidōji Masashige, a senior Hōjō clan retainer, was also forced to commit seppuku by Hideyoshi, however, his children were spared from execution at the behest of Ieyasu. The eldest son, Daidōji Naoshige, became Ieyasu's vassal after the death of Ujinao.

On October 28 of the same year, a massive revolt against the Toyotomi government in Mutsu Province was incited by Hienuki Hirotada and Waga Yoshitada. In response, Hideyoshi sent a punitive expedition with an army 30,000 strong led by Ieyasu Tokugawa, Toyotomi Hidetsugu, Date Masamune, Ishida Mitsunari, Ōtani Yoshitsugu, Gamō Ujisato, Uesugi Kagekatsu, Satake Yoshishige, and Maeda Toshiie in order to pacify the rebellion.

In 1591, Ieyasu gave up control of his five provinces (Mikawa, Tōtōmi, Suruga, Shinano, and Kai) and moved all his soldiers and vassals to his eight new provinces in the Kantō region. The proclamation of this decision happened on the same day as Hideyoshi entered Odawara castle after the Hōjō clan formally surrendered. The moment Ieyasu was appointed to rule Kantō, he immediately assigned his premier vassals, including Ii Naomasa, Honda Tadakatsu, Sakakibara Yasumasa, and Sakai Ietsugu, the son of Sakai Tadatsugu, to each control a large area of the former Hōjō clan territories in Kantō. Historians saw this step as aimed at bringing order to the newly subdued population of the area, while also guarding the eastern domains from any influence or threat from the Satomi clan, which had not yet submitted to Toyotomi rule at that time. Meanwhile, Ieyasu himself established his personal seat of power in Edo town, which at that time was an underdeveloped town in Kantō.

Kanto Region in Japan

Historian Adam Sadler saw this step as the riskiest Ieyasu ever made—to leave his home province and rely on the uncertain loyalty of the former Hōjō clan samurai in Kantō. In the end, it worked out brilliantly for Ieyasu. He reformed the Kantō region, controlled and pacified the Hōjō samurai, and improved the underlying economic infrastructure. Also, because Kantō was somewhat isolated from the rest of Japan, Ieyasu was able to ally with daimyo of north-eastern Japan including Date Masamune, Mogami Yoshiaki, Satake Yoshishige and Nanbu Nobunao; he was also able to maintain a unique level of autonomy from Toyotomi Hideyoshi's rule. Within a few years, Ieyasu had become the second most powerful daimyo in Japan. An anecdotal proverb says, "Ieyasu won the Empire by retreating."

Modern Japanese historians reject that this was a deliberate move by Ieyasu since it was an order from Hideyoshi. Nevertheless, Watanabe Daimon stated that, while the general opinion was that Ieyasu was reluctant about his transfer to Kantō, this perception was unfounded. Instead, Daimon suspected that Ieyasu actually responded to this transfer positively as he saw potential in making undeveloped Edo into his seat of power. (Note: Historian Andō Yūichirō added, the true intention of Hideyoshi in transferring Ieyasu to Kantō was to weaken the power of the Tokugawa clan by moving them from their ancestral land in Mikawa, as he expected the former Hōjō vassals in Kantō would rebel against Ieyasu. However, Kahara Toshi stated recent academic consensus is that this step by Hideyoshi would better viewed as a sign of his trust in Ieyasu's capability to rebuild the post-war Kantō.)

Similarly, Andō Yūichirō viewed this transfer as an advantage for the Tokugawa regime in the long run, as this move was not only doubled the territory that he controlled, but it further added numerous new vassals in Kantō to the already impressive political and military power of the Tokugawa regime, which had already absorbed the armies of the Imagawa and Takeda clans before. Yūichirō added that aside from the samurai from Imagawa, Takeda, and Hōjō, the Mikawa samurai clans who were traditional followers of the Tokugawa clan also lost their sense of independence after being transferred into a new unfamiliar territory, which increased their sense of dependence on Ieyasu, in effect further minimizing the possibility of them going renegade and betraying Ieyasu, as Ishikawa Kazumasa had done several years earlier.

After the Waga-Hienuki rebellion, the Kunohe rebellion led by Kunohe Masazane broke out on March 13, 1591. This caused the punitive expedition army to split their forces as Ieyasu, Naomasa, Ujisato, and some commanders changed their focus to suppress Masazane's rebellion first. Ieyasu, who at that time was also busy suppressing rebellions with his main commanders, including Sakakibara Yasumasa, Ii Naomasa, and Honda Tadakatsu, arrived at Iwatesawa, Tamazukuri district, Mutsu (modern day Iwadeyama, Miyagi Prefecture) on August 18, where he camped until October and led the troops.

During the operation against the Kunohe clan rebels, Naomasa Ii became the vanguard with Nanbu Nobunao. As they advanced towards Kunohe castle, they faced a small force of Kunohe rebels which they easily defeated. Naomasa suggested to besiege the castle until they surrendered, which was met with agreement.

On 4 September, the rebels executed the prisoners inside the castle and incited mass suicide after setting fire to the castle. The castle burned for three days and nights killing all within. The rebellions were suppressed by June 20, with Waga Yoshitada being slain in battle, while Hienuki Hirotada was sentenced to "Kaieki law" which stated that his and his clan's status and rights as samurai were stripped.

As the operation ended, Ieyasu returned to Edo on October 29 and began managing his new territory in the Kantō region. Ieyasu managed to establish his home base in Kantō, and built sustainable economic infrastructure in the region. Ieyasu also employed Gotō Shōzaburō, head of the gold mining and metal industries of the Sengoku period, to mint gold coins and establish a bank-like institution for the Tokugawa clan's government.

In 1592, Toyotomi Hideyoshi invaded Korea as a prelude to his plan to attack China. The Tokugawa clan samurai didn't take part in this campaign, as Hideyoshi had ordered the eastern provinces' daimyo including Ieyasu, Uesugi Kagekatsu, and Date Masamune to maintain logistical support for the war effort in Nagoya Castle. (Note: Historian Kōichirō Hamada examined the historical records regarding the Korean invasion where Ieyasu expressed his eagerness to participate in this campaign. However, Hideyoshi organized to prioritize the daimyo lords from western provinces as vanguard which divided into 9 divisions, as he saw their positions were closer to Korea. Hamada stated by the fact that Korean invasion were dragged for years, there is good possibility that Ieyasu and other eastern province daimyo lords would be sent to Korea if Hideyoshi lived longer and the Korean campaign continues.)

In 1593, Toyotomi Hideyoshi fathered a son and heir, Toyotomi Hideyori. Later, though still in early 1593, Ieyasu himself was summoned to Hideyoshi's court in Nagoya (in Kyushu, not the similarly spelled city in Owari Province) as a military advisor and was given command of troops meant as reserves for the Korean campaign. Ieyasu stayed in Nagoya intermittedly for the next five years.

In July 1595, the "Toyotomi Hidetsugu Incident" occurred. In response to this major incident shaking the Toyotomi government, Hideyoshi ordered various daimyo to come to Kyoto in an attempt to calm the situation. Ieyasu also came to Kyoto on Hideyoshi's orders. From this point on, Ieyasu spent longer and longer periods in Fushimi Castle than in his underdeveloped residence, Edo Castle. Due to this chain of events, Ieyasu's position in the Toyotomi government had risen, but by being at the center of the government, Ieyasu was able to learn directly about the central government's political system.

== Ruler of Japan (1598–1603) ==
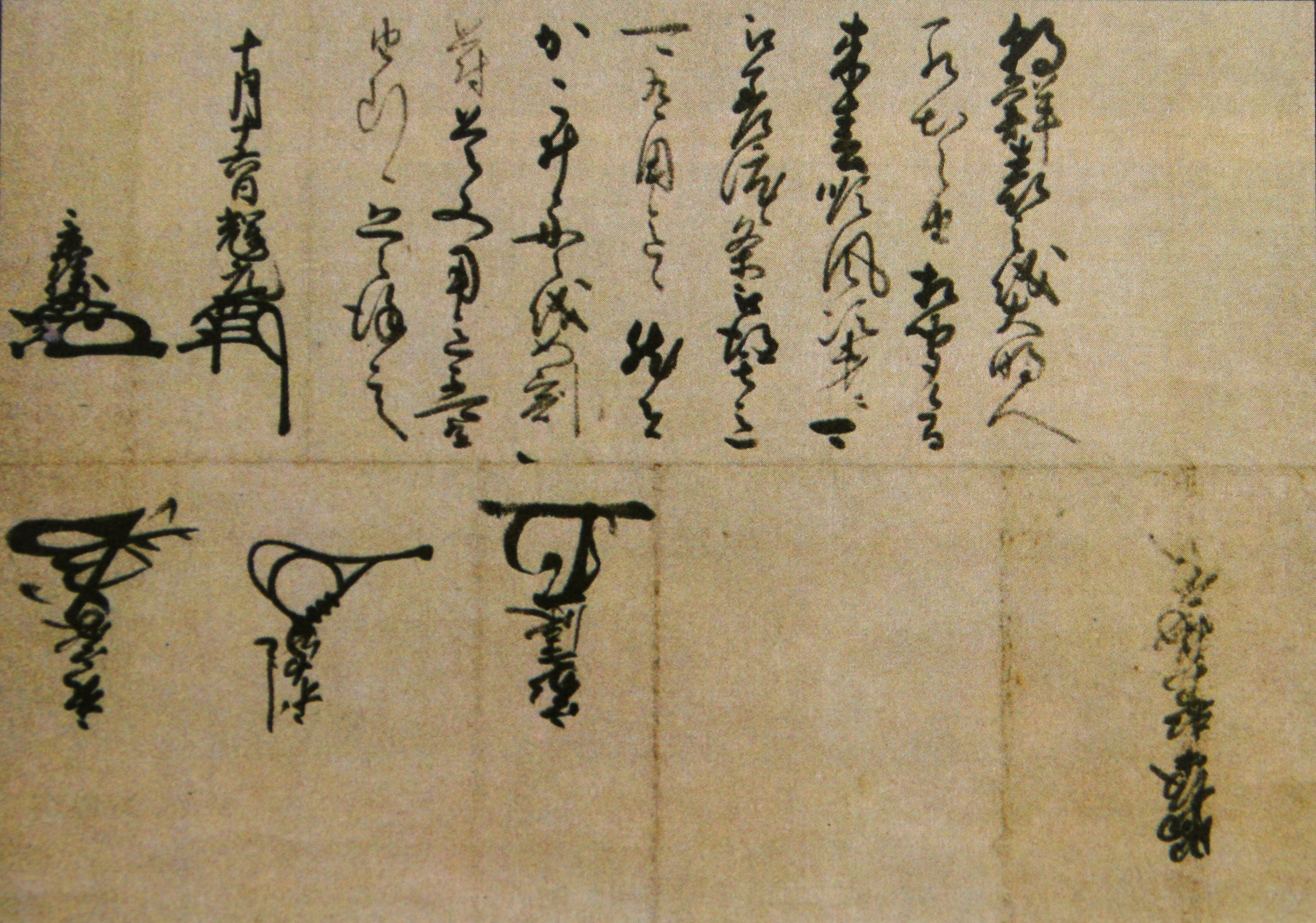
The signatures of the Five Elders. From the top left, Uesugi Kagekatsu and Mori Terumoto, from the bottom left, Ukita Hideie, Maeda Toshiie, and Tokugawa Ieyasu. The bottom row is upside down.

In 1598, with his health clearly failing, Hideyoshi called a meeting that would determine the Council of Five Elders, who would be responsible for ruling on behalf of his son after his death. The five that were chosen as tairō (regents) for Hideyori were Maeda Toshiie, Mōri Terumoto, Ukita Hideie, Uesugi Kagekatsu, and Ieyasu, who was the most powerful of the five. This change in the pre-Sekigahara power structure became pivotal as Ieyasu turned his attention towards Kansai; at the same time, other ambitious (albeit ultimately unrealized) plans, such as the Tokugawa initiative establishing official relations with New Spain (modern-day Mexico), continued to unfold and advance.

=== Death of Hideyoshi and Toshiie ===
Toyotomi Hideyoshi, after three more months of deteriorating health, died on September 18, 1598. He was nominally succeeded by his young son Hideyori but as he was just five years old, the real power was in the hands of the regents. There were several incidents involving Ieyasu after the death of Hideyoshi:

- The government of Japan under Toyotomi's rule had an incident when seven military generals (Fukushima Masanori, Katō Kiyomasa, Ikeda Terumasa, Hosokawa Tadaoki, Asano Yoshinaga, Katō Yoshiaki, and Kuroda Nagamasa) came into conflict with Ishida Mitsunari. It was said that the reason for this was that they were dissastisfied with Mitsunari because he wrote poor assessments and underreported their achievements during the Imjin War against Korea and the Chinese empire. At first, these generals gathered at Kiyomasa's mansion in Osaka Castle, and from there they marched to Mitsunari's mansion. However, Mitsunari learned of this through a report from a servant of Toyotomi Hideyori named Jiemon Kuwajima and he fled to Satake Yoshinobu's mansion together with Shima Sakon and others to hide. When the seven generals found that Mitsunari was not in the mansion, they searched the mansions of various feudal lords in Osaka Castle, and Katō's army approached the Satake residence. Mitsunari and his party then escaped from the Satake residence and barricaded themselves at Fushimi Castle.

The next day, the seven generals surrounded Fushimi Castle with their soldiers as they knew Mitsunari was hiding there. Ieyasu, who was in charge of political affairs in Fushimi Castle at that moment, attempted to arbitrate the situation. The seven generals requested Ieyasu hand over Mitsunari, which Ieyasu refused. Ieyasu then negotiated a promise to let Mitsunari retire and to review the assessment of the Battle of Ulsan Castle in Korea. Ieyasu had his second son, Yūki Hideyasu, escort Mitsunari to Sawayama Castle. (Note: historian Watanabe Daimon stated from the primary and secondary sources text about the accident this was more of legal conflict between those generals with Mitsunari, rather than conspiracy to murder him. The role of Ieyasu here was not to physically protect Mitsunari from any physical harm from them, but to mediate the complaints of those generals.) (Note: Historians viewed this incident were not just simply personal problems between those seven generals against Mitsunari, as it was viewed as an extension of the political rivalries between the Tokugawa faction and the anti-Tokugawa faction which was led by Mitsunari. Following this incident, those military figures on bad terms with Mitsunari would support Ieyasu later during the conflict of Sekigahara between the Eastern army led by Tokugawa Ieyasu and the Western army led by Ishida Mitsunari. Muramatsu Shunkichi, writer of The Surprising Passions and Desires of the Heroes and Heroines of Japanese History, gave his assessment that the reason of Mitsunari failure in his war against Ieyasu was due to his unpopularity among the major political figures of that time.)

- Tokugawa ordered his general, Sakakibara Yasumasa, to lead an army from Kantō to camp in Seta, Ōmi Province as a means of showing off and intimidating the bureaucratic faction which was led by Ishida Mitsunari, because Ōmi was the traditional hometown of the Mitsunari clan.
- In 1599, a riot occurred within the Ukita clan when several of Ukita clan vassals, including Togawa Tatsuyasu, Sadatsuna Oka and others, rebelled against Hideie. At first, Ieyasu sent his general Sakakibara Yasumasa to mediate the disputes between Ukita Hideie and his various rebellious vassals. However, the situation was not resolved for a long time so Ieyasu ordered Yasumasa to return to his post and decided to resolve the case himself. Ieyasu managed to solve the case and averted a civil war between two factions. However, in the aftermath of this incident many of Hideie retainers such as Sakazaki Naomori changed their allegiance to Tokugawa Ieyasu and left Hideie. These defections caused massive setbacks for the Ukita clan politically and militarily, while strengthening Ieyasu.
- In April 1599, Ieyasu cited Hideyoshi's will as pretext for him to review the decision regarding the Mōri clan territories that Mitsunari had pushed through, and pressed Mōri Terumoto to allocate part of Nagato Province and Suō Province to Mōri Hidemoto. In June, Ieyasu's manifesto to curtail Terumoto's domains was implemented, as Hidemoto had been given the former Mōri Motokiyo territory of Nagato, Yoshiki District in Suō, Aki, and Bingo, leaving Kikkawa Hiroie's territory intact, and returned Kobayakawa Takakage's estate to Terumoto.
- Ieyasu had his general and diplomat, Ii Naomasa, establish contact with the scions of Kuroda clan, Kuroda Yoshitaka and Kuroda Nagamasa, and gained their political support.
- On September 12, 1599, when Ieyasu returned to Fushimi castle from Osaka castle, there was an alleged assassination attempt by three Toyotomi Hideyoshi vassals named Katsuhisa Hijikata, Asano Nagamasa, and Ōno Harunaga. Their attempt to assassinate Ieyasu failed due to Ieyasu's tight security and bodyguards. When they were apprehended, further investigation also linked the assassination attempt with Maeda Toshimasa, son of Maeda Toshiie. Ieyasu consulted with Honda Masanobu about the proper punishment for each conspirator, Masanobu instead advised Ieyasu to show leniency towards the three perpetrators. In the end, Ieyasu accepted Masanobu's counsel and decided that he would not execute them, in exchange, he placed Hijikata and Katsuhisa on house arrest on northern side of the Kantō region. Meanwhile, Nagamasa was given a far more lenient punishment than his compatriots by only being ordered to move his residence, Musashi Fuchū, as Ieyasu saw Nagamasa had an important political position in the government. As for Toshimasa, Ieyasu prepared a harsh punishment and he prepared to dispatch his army to Kaga in order to subjugate Toshinaga, who was one of the Five Elders. In response, Toshinaga sent his subordinate, Nagatomo Yokoyama, to Ieyasu and immediately apologized to Ieyasu. Furthermore, he sent his mother, Hoshunin, as a hostage to Edo, and arranged for his adopted heir, Toshitsune, to marry Hidetada's daughter, Tamahime. Due to those four men later supporting Ieyasu in the Sekigahara war against Mitsunari, modern historian Daimon Watanabe saw Tokugawa's lenient attitude towards his would-be assassins as a political move to gather more allies to would support him in the future war.
- Tokugawa married his sixth son, Matsudaira Tadateru, to Irohahime, the first daughter of Date Masamune.

Ieyasu also gained support from Mogami Yoshiaki, brother-in-law of Masamune and a powerful eastern daimyo, who had held a grudge against the Toyotomi clan since Hideyoshi executed his daughter in the Hidetsugu Incident of 1595. Hidetsugu had been accused of treason and forced to commit seppuku at Mount Kōya. In the aftermath of this incident, his entire family was also executed at Sanjogawara. Yoshiaki's daughter, Komahime, who was only 15 years old and had recently married Hidetsugu, was executed as a result. Yoshiaki begged for her life to be spared as she hadn't even met Hidetsugu yet, but his request was refused. Komahime was beheaded along with the others, and her body dumped in the Sanjogawara River. As result of the execution, Yoshiaki's wife, Osaki-dono, was struck with deep grief by the sudden death of her daughter and died on August 16. After this, Yoshiaki grew closer to Ieyasu and became one of his strongest supporters.

- Another incident occurred in 1595 with the Shimazu clan, when Shimazu Tadatsune, the third son of Shimazu Yoshihiro and heir to the main Shimazu family, assassinated a clan's chief vassal named Ijuin Tadamune. The background to this incident seems to be that Tadamune, who was on close terms with Ishida Mitsunari, had infringed on the Shimazu clan's domain. However, the incident did not end there, and Tadamune's eldest son, Ijuin Tadamasa, started a rebellion. As the civil war reached deadlock, Ieyasu mediated the two sides, which resulted in Tadamasa surrendering in March 1600.

=== Conflict with Mitsunari ===
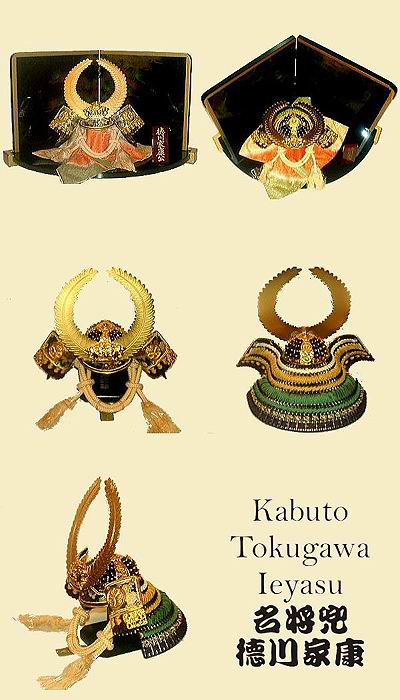
The kabuto (helmet) of Tokugawa Ieyasu

Meanwhile, opposition to Ieyasu centered around Ishida Mitsunari, one of Hideyoshi's Go-Bugyō, or top administrators of Hideyoshi's government, and a powerful daimyo who was not one of the regents. Mitsunari plotted Ieyasu's death and news of this plot reached some of Ieyasu's generals. They attempted to kill Mitsunari but he fled and gained protection from Ieyasu. It is not clear why Ieyasu protected a powerful enemy from his own men, but Ieyasu was a master strategist and may have concluded that he would be better off with Mitsunari leading the enemy army rather than one of the more legitimate regents.

Nearly all of Japan's daimyo and samurai were now split into two factions; the Western Army (Mitsunari's group) and the Eastern Army (Ieyasu's group). Ieyasu had the support of the anti-Mitsunari group, and formed them into his potential allies. Ieyasu's allies were Katō Kiyomasa, Fukushima Masanori, Mogami Yoshiaki, Hachisuka Iemasa, the Kuroda clan, the Hosokawa clan and many daimyo from eastern Japan. Mitsunari had allied himself with three other regents: Ukita Hideie, Mōri Terumoto, and Uesugi Kagekatsu, as well as with Ōtani Yoshitsugu, the Chosokabe clan, the Shimazu clan and many daimyo from the western end of Honshū.

War became imminent when Uesugi Kagekatsu, one of Hideyoshi's appointed regents, defied Ieyasu by building up his military at Aizu. When Ieyasu officially condemned him and demanded that he come to Kyoto to explain himself, Kagekatsu's chief advisor, Naoe Kanetsugu, responded with a counter-condemnation that mocked Ieyasu's abuses and violations of Hideyoshi's rules. This infuriated Ieyasu.

In July 1600, Ieyasu was back in Edo and his allies moved their armies to defeat the Uesugi clan, which were accused of planning to revolt against the Toyotomi administration. On September 8, Ieyasu received information that Mitsunari had captured Fushimi castle and his allies had moved their army against Ieyasu. Ieyasu held a meeting with the Eastern Army daimyo, and they agreed to follow Ieyasu. Later, on September 15, Mitsunari's Western army arrived at Ogaki Castle. On September 29, Ieyasu's Eastern Army took Gifu Castle. On October 7, Ieyasu and his allies marched along the Tōkaidō, while his son Hidetada went along through Nakasendō with 38,000 soldiers (a battle against Sanada Masayuki in Shinano Province delayed Hidetada's forces, and they did not arrive in time for the main Battle of Sekigahara).

=== Battle of Sekigahara ===
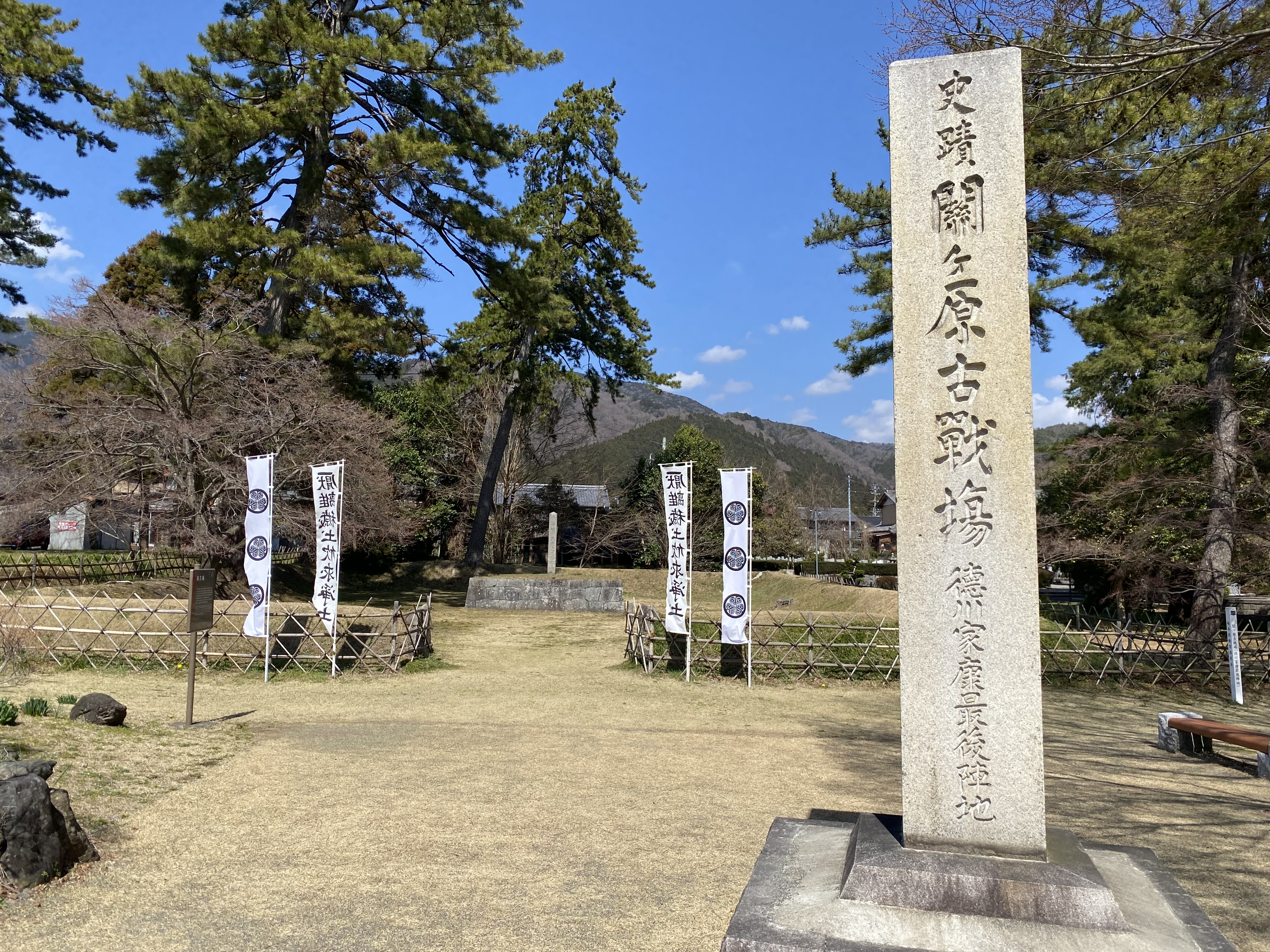
Tokugawa Ieyasu last position during the battle

The Battle of Sekigahara was the biggest battle as well as one of the most important in Japanese feudal history. It began on October 21, 1600. The Eastern Army led by Tokugawa Ieyasu initially numbered 75,000 men, with the Western Army at a strength of 120,000 men under Ishida Mitsunari. Ieyasu had also secretly acquired a supply of arquebuses.

Knowing that the Tokugawa forces were heading towards Osaka, Mitsunari decided to abandon his positions and marched to Sekigahara. Even though the Western Army had tremendous tactical advantages, Ieyasu had already been in contact with many of the daimyo in the Western Army for months, promising them land and leniency after the battle should they switch sides. Ieyasu had also secretly communicated with Toyotomi Hideyoshi's nephew, Kobayakawa Hideaki. With a total of 170,000 soldiers facing each other, the Battle of Sekigahara ensued and ended with an overwhelming Tokugawa victory. At the conclusion of the battle, Ieyasu marched to Osaka castle, where Mōri Terumoto, the grand commander of Western army, surrendered to him.

The Western bloc quickly collapsed, and over the next few days Ishida Mitsunari and other western leaders such as Konishi Yukinaga and Ankokuji Ekei were captured and executed. However, Ieyasu was angry at his son Hidetada, whose army was late to arrive, leading to an unexpectedly long siege against Ueda castle. Sakakibara Yasumasa offered an explanation and testified in defense of Hidetada. Meanwhile, Ieyasu pardoned his enemies who defended Ueda castle, including Sanada Masayuki and Sanada Yukimura, at the behest of Ii Naomasa and Sanada Nobuyuki.

=== Aftermath of Sekigahara battle ===
Ieyasu redistributed the domain fiefs of all the daimyo lords who supported him during the war, such as increasing Ii Naomasa domain to 180,000 koku. Ikeda Terumasa's to 520,000 Koku. Tōdō Takatora got a new domain which was assessed at a total of 200,000 koku, Yuki Hideyasu went from 101,000 to 569,000 koku, Matsudaira Tadayoshi went from 100,000 to 520,000 koku, Gamō Hideyuki increased from 180,000 to 600,000 koku, Maeda Toshinaga went from 835,000 to 1,100,000 koku, Katō Kiyomasa's domain grew from 195,000 to 515,000 koku, and Kuroda Nagamasa's grew from 180,000 to 523,000 koku. Meanwhile, Fukushima Masanori had his 200,000 koku domain increased to 498,000 in Aki, Hiroshima. Ieyasu also promoted many of his own hereditary vassals to domains of at least 10,000 koku for their stipends. After the battle, Ieyasu left some Western Army daimyo unharmed, such as the Shimazu clan, but others were completely destroyed. Toyotomi Hideyori (the son of Hideyoshi) lost most of his territory which was under management of western daimyo, and was degraded to an ordinary daimyo, rather than a Sesshō or Kampaku (regent) of the Japanese empire. In later years, the vassals who had pledged allegiance to Ieyasu before Sekigahara became known as the fudai daimyō, while those who pledged allegiance to him after the battle (after his power was unquestioned) were known as tozama daimyō. Tozama daimyō were considered inferior to fudai daimyō. This redistribution of domains was done verbally, instead of by formal letter of intent. Historian Watanabe Daimon suspected this was because Ieyasu was still wary of the existence of Toyotomi clan which had been inherited by Toyotomi Hideyori.

On September 20, Ieyasu entered Otsu castle, where he welcomed and met with Kyōnyo, the head of Hongan-ji temple at that time, with Kanamori Nagachika as an intermediary. He met Ieyasu again the following year (1601), and Ieyasu visited Kyōnyo on July 5 and August 16. However, for the rest of 1601, the relationship between them grew worse as Kyōnyo was accused of pro-Mitsunari sympathy. It was only in February 1602 that the communication between Ieyasu with Kyōnyo opened again. This was after the intercession from aide Honda Masanobu, where the three of them discussed the condition of the Hongan-ji temple development after the split of the sect into two factions. Ieyasu worried the strife within the temple could affect the stability of Japan after the Sekigahara war.

In 1602, Ieyasu changed his surname from "Minamoto" to "Fujiwara". The reason for this changing was because Emperor Go-Yōzei wanted to appoint Ieyasu to be a court noble. However, there was no precedent in the Tokugawa bloodline as the Minamoto clan which Ieyasu ancestry claimed, was a samurai clan rather than a noble family. To resolve this problem, a fabrication was made that said the Tokugawa clan also descended from Fujiwara clan, which was a noble family. By changing his name to Fujiwara, Ieyasu was able to be appointed to the rank of Junior Fifth Rank. (Note: This predecent was found in a letter from Konoe Motohisa dated February 20, 1602 (Keicho 7). The circumstances surrounding Ieyasu's change of surname were similar to a previous case, when he changed from "Matsudaira" to "Tokugawa" in a letter dated December 3, 1566 (Eiroku 9) from Maehisa Konoe (Konoe Family Documents).)

== Establishment of the Tokugawa shogunate (1603–1616) ==
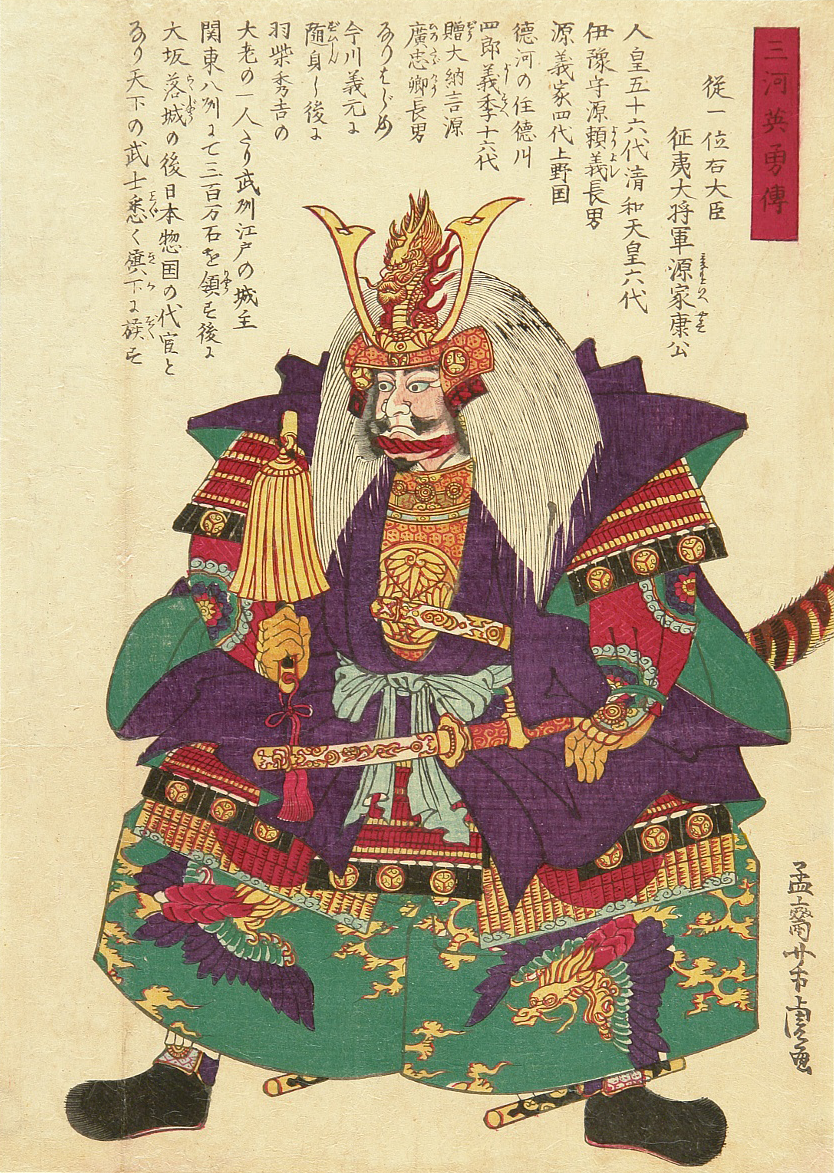
Ukiyo-e of Tokugawa Ieyasu

On March 24, 1603, Tokugawa Ieyasu received the title of shōgun from Emperor Go-Yōzei. In the same day, he was also appointed as Minister of the Right, Overall Head of the Minamoto-Genji clan (Genji Chōja), and also Chief Attendant of the Bullock-cart Proclamation.

Ieyasu was 60 years old and had outlasted all the other great men of his times: Oda Nobunaga, Takeda Shingen, Toyotomi Hideyoshi, and Uesugi Kenshin. As shōgun, he used his remaining years to create and solidify the Tokugawa shogunate, which ushered in the Edo period, and was the third shogunal government (after the Kamakura and the Ashikaga). He claimed descent from the Minamoto clan who had founded the Kamakura shogunate, by way of the Nitta clan. His descendants would marry into the Taira clan and the Fujiwara clan.

Following a well established Japanese pattern, Ieyasu abdicated his official position as shōgun in 1605. His successor was his son and heir, Tokugawa Hidetada. There may have been several factors that contributed to his decision, including his desire to avoid being tied up in ceremonial duties, to make it harder for his enemies to attack his real power center, and to secure a smoother succession for his son.

In 1604, Tōdō Takatora and Date Masamune advised the shogunate government to introduce a rule across Japan that each feudal lord was obliged to maintain a residence in Edo, the capital of the shogunate, which Ieyasu immediately accepted and implemented officially.

=== Ōgosho (1605–1616) ===
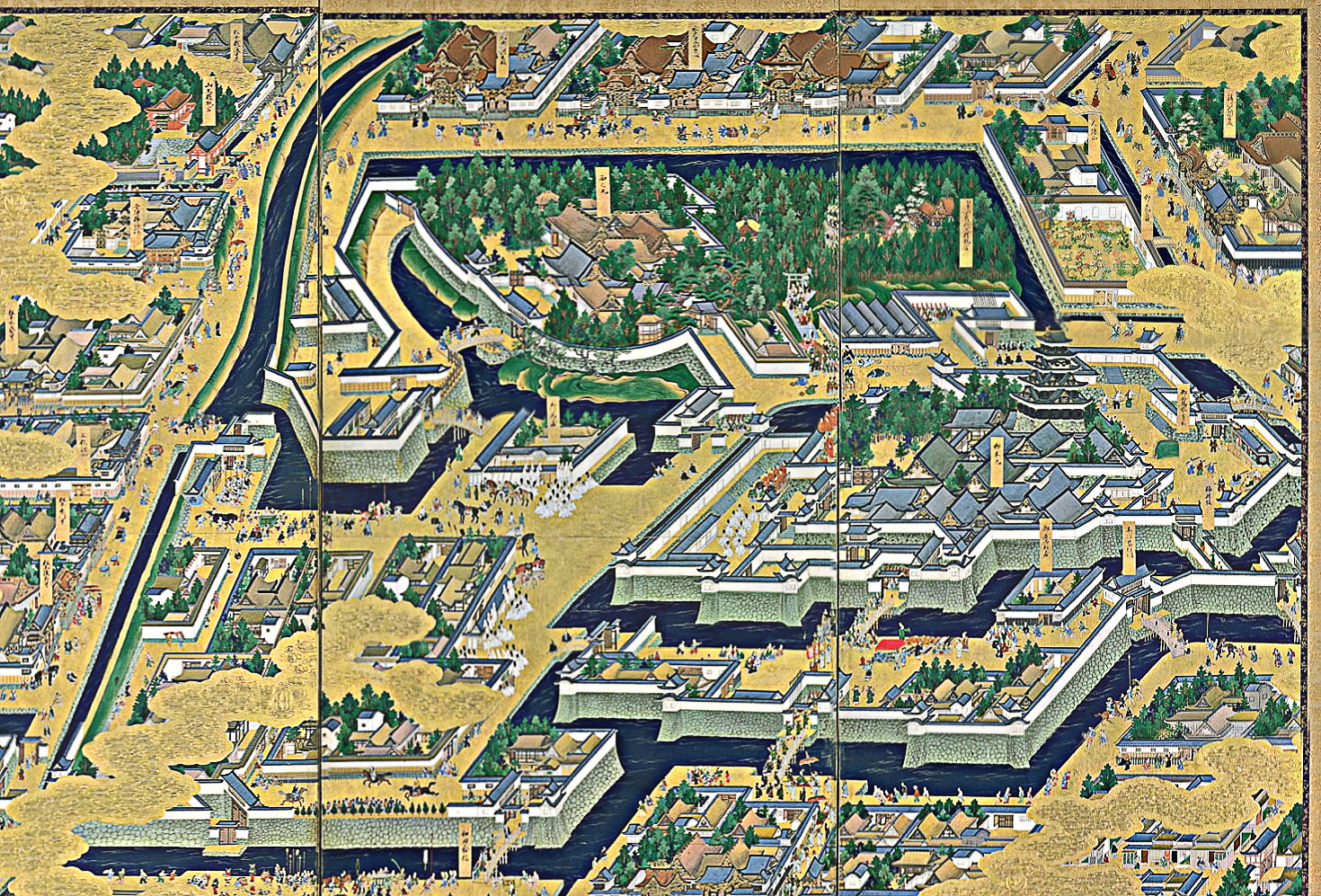
Edo Castle from a 17th-century painting

From 1605 onwards, Ieyasu, who had retired from the official position of shogun and became a retired shōgun (大御所, ōgosho), remained the effective ruler of Japan until his death. Ieyasu retired to Sunpu Castle in Sunpu, but he also supervised the building of Edo Castle, a massive construction project which lasted for the rest of Ieyasu's life. The result was the largest castle in all of Japan. The cost of building the castle was borne by all the other daimyo, while Ieyasu reaped the benefits. The central donjon, or tenshu, burned in the 1657 Meireki fire. Today, the Imperial Palace stands on the site of the castle.

Edo became the center of political power and the de facto capital of Japan, although the historic capital of Kyoto remained the de jure capital as the seat of the emperor. Furthermore, Ieyasu had the Imperial Court appoint his eldest remaining son, Hidetada, as Shogun, announcing to the world that the position of shogun would be hereditary to the Tokugawa clan from then on. At the same time, he requested Toyotomi Hideyori meet the new shogun, but Hideyori refused. In the end, the matter was resolved by sending his sixth son, Matsudaira Tadateru to Osaka Castle. At the same time, the next generation of Tokugawa clan vassals, including Ii Naotaka and Itakura Shigemasa, were also appointed.

In 1608, Ieyasu assigned control of the Tsu Domain to Takatora. It was reported that the landholdings which Takatora received in Iga province had previously belonged to a lord named Tsutsui Sadatsugu. Ieyasu stripped Tsutsui Sadatsugu of ownership rights before giving them to Takatora. The initial pretext was Sadatsugu's sloppy governance of the domain however, historians have argued that the real reason was because Sadatsugu behaved suspiciously by visiting Toyotomi Hideyori at Osaka Castle, without approval of the shogun, while the land which Sadatsugu occupied was considered to be an important military strategic location. Furthermore, it is thought that Ieyasu expropriated the land and gave it to the Todo clan as political strategy against the Toyotomi clan, even though he was a patron of the Toyotomi family, Tōdō Takatora was considered a close ally of Ieyasu. Thus by putting him in control of portions of Iga province, the influence of the shogunate could be expanded to more strategic locations without directly provoking the Toyotomi faction in Osaka.

In 1611, (Keicho 16), Ieyasu, at the head of 50,000 men, visited Kyoto to witness the enthronement of Emperor Go-Mizunoo. While in Kyoto, Ieyasu ordered the remodeling of the Imperial Court, buildings, and forced the remaining western daimyo to sign an oath of fealty to him. On April 12, Ieyasu presented three articles of legislation to the daimyo in Kyoto. These Three Laws, as they were called, referred to the first shogun's set of laws and those that signed would strictly abide by the laws issued by the shogunate from then on. Second, the lords swore to not conceal those who disobeyed the shogun's orders, and third: to not hide or give shelter to any enemy of the state. 22 daimyo from the Hokuriku region and Western provinces agreed to the three articles of legislation and submitted an oath. Daimyo from Oshu and Kanto were not included in this list, because they were engaged in the construction of Edo Castle and did not come to Kyoto. In January of the following year, 11 major feudal lords from Oshu and Kanto swore to the Three Laws. 50 small and medium-sized fudai and tozama feudal lords also swore to the Three Laws, and Ieyasu succeeded in making all the feudal lords in the country his vassals.

Ieyasu did not have Hideyori work on national construction, nor did he have him swear to the Three Laws. Watanabe Daimon saw that the Three Laws issued by Ieyasu was a maneuver to isolate Hideyori politically by making all other influential daimyo lords obey him.

In 1613, he composed the Kuge shohatto (公家諸法度), a document which put the court daimyo under strict supervision, leaving them as mere ceremonial figureheads.

In 1615, Ieyasu prepared the Buke shohatto (武家諸法度), a document setting out the future of the Tokugawa regime.

=== Relations with Catholics ===
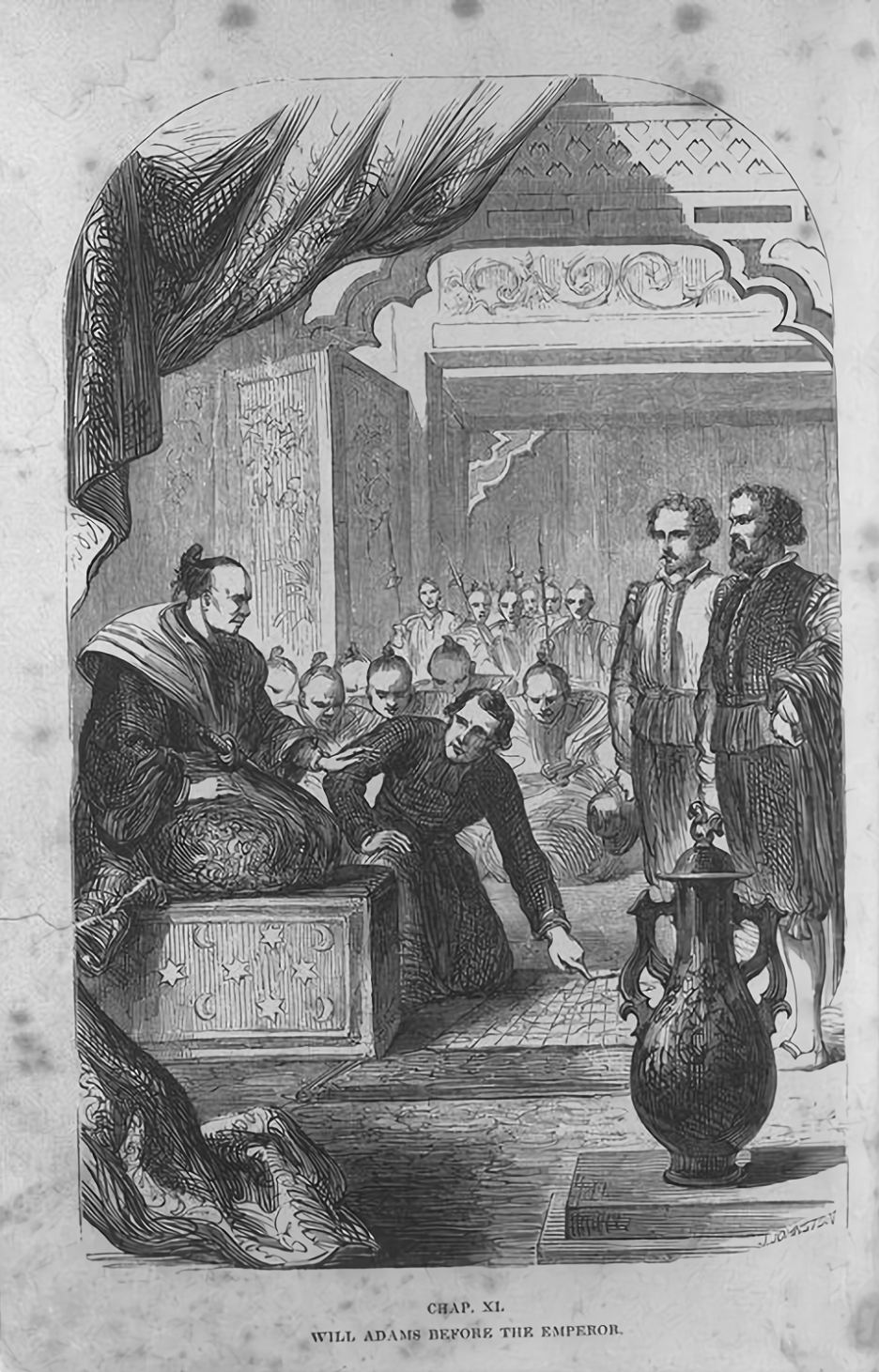
William Adams before shogun Tokugawa Ieyasu

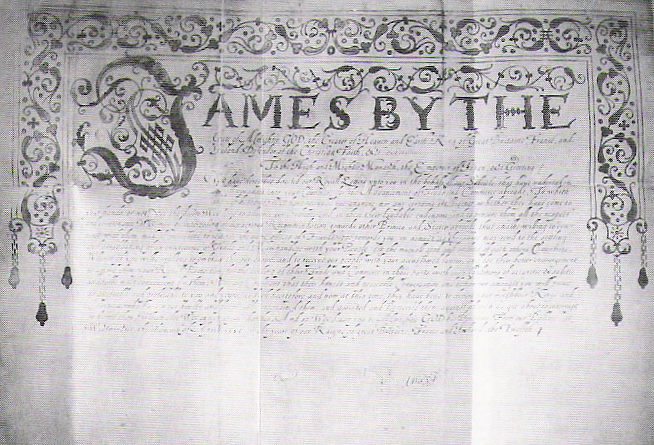
Letter from King James VI of Scotland and I of England and Ireland to ogosho Tokugawa Ieyasu in 1613

As Ōgosho, Ieyasu also supervised diplomatic affairs with the Netherlands, Spain, and England. Ieyasu chose to distance Japan from European influence starting in 1609, although the shogunate still granted preferential trading rights to the Dutch East India Company and permitted them to maintain a "factory" for trading purposes.

From 1605 until his death, Ieyasu frequently consulted English shipwright and pilot, William Adams. Adams, a Protestant fluent in Japanese, assisted the shogunate in negotiating trading relations, but was cited by members of the competing Jesuit and Spanish-sponsored mendicant orders as an obstacle to improved relations between Ieyasu and the Roman Catholic Church.

In 1612, the Nossa Senhora da Graça incident occurred in Nagasaki, where the bugyō official of Sakai Hasegawa Fujihiro had trouble with Portuguese captain André Pessoa. The conflict escalated when Pessoa and the merchants from Macau petitioned Ieyasu directly to complain about Hasegawa and Murayama Tōan, a magistrate of Ieyasu. When the Jesuits learned of this affair, they were horrified when they found out about Pessoa's petition as they knew that Hasegawa's sister Onatsu was a favorite concubine of Ieyasu.

Later, Pessoa withdrew his petition when he learned of the internal politics of the shogunate. However, Fujihiro refused to forgive Pessoa's petition. Fujihiro encouraged Arima Harunobu, who wanted to retaliate for the prior Macau incident, to petition Ieyasu for the capture of Pessoa and the seizure of his merchant ship. Ieyasu, who had entrusted Harunobu with the purchase of agarwood, was initially concerned that a retaliatory act would cut off trade with Portuguese ships. Thus, the shogunate took a lenient attitude to Pessoa, as Honda Masazumi, with authorization from Ieyasu, gave Pessoa's envoy written assurances that Japanese sailors would be forbidden to travel to Macau, and any who did could be handled according to Portuguese laws. However, Ieyasu later gave Harunobu permission to capture Pessoa after he had been guaranteed that Manila ships of Spanish merchants would be able to replenish raw silk and other goods carried by Portuguese ships and also expected Dutch ships to continue arriving. Then Ieyasu gave authorization to Hasegawa and Arima Harunobu.

After several days of battle, which resulted in Pessoa's death, the remaining Portuguese merchants and missionaries were increasingly concerned about their fates, especially since Ieyasu had personally ordered their execution. Harunobu, who was Catholic, interceded on behalf of the Jesuits. Ieyasu changed his decision and the merchants were allowed to leave for Macau with their property. Ieyasu's Jesuit translator, João Rodrigues Tçuzu, was replaced by William Adams. Ieyasu then expelled João Rodrigues from Japan.

In 1612, the Okamoto Daihachi incident occurred where Okamoto Daihachi (岡本大八, baptismal name Paulo), a Christian aide to the rōjū Honda Masazumi, and Arima Harunobu, were implicated in series of crimes including bribery, conspiracy, forgery, and attempt to murder Hasegawa Fujihiro. Ieyasu was angered when he heard that Catholic followers had gathered at Okamoto's execution to offer prayers and sing hymns.

in 1614, Ieyasu was sufficiently concerned about Spanish territorial ambitions and signed the Christian Expulsion Edict. The edict banned the practice of Christianity and led to the expulsion of all foreign missionaries although some smaller Dutch trading operations remained in Nagasaki.

=== Conflict with Hideyori ===
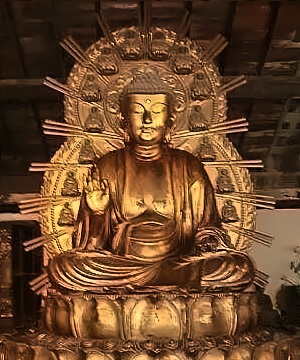
Replica of Great Buddha of Kyoto built by Hideyori

The last remaining threat to Ieyasu's rule was Toyotomi Hideyori, the son and rightful heir to Hideyoshi. He was now a young daimyo living in Osaka Castle. Many samurai who opposed Ieyasu rallied around Hideyori, claiming that he was the rightful ruler of Japan. Ieyasu found fault with the opening ceremony of a temple (Great Buddha of Kyoto) built by Hideyori; it was as if he prayed for Ieyasu's death and the ruin of the Tokugawa clan. Ieyasu ordered Hideyori to leave Osaka Castle, but those in the castle refused and summoned samurai to gather within the castle. Then in 1614, Ieyasu besieged Osaka Castle.

Tokugawa forces, with a huge army led by Ieyasu and shōgun Tokugawa Hidetada, laid siege to Osaka Castle in what is now known as "the Winter Siege of Osaka". Eventually, the Tokugawa were able to force negotiations and an armistice after cannon fire threatened Hideyori's mother, Yodo-dono. However, once the treaty had been agreed on, the Tokugawa filled in the castle's outer moats with sand so their troops could walk across. Through this ploy, Tokugawa gained a huge tract of land through negotiation and deception that they could not have gained through siege and combat. Ieyasu returned to Sunpu Castle, but after Toyotomi Hideyori refused another order to leave Osaka, Ieyasu and his allied army of 155,000 soldiers attacked Osaka Castle again in "the Summer Siege of Osaka".

In late 1615, Osaka Castle fell and nearly all the defenders were killed, including Hideyori, his mother (Toyotomi Hideyoshi's widow, Yodo-dono), and his infant son. His wife, Senhime (a granddaughter of Ieyasu), pleaded to save Hideyori and Yodo-dono's lives. Ieyasu refused and either required them to commit seppuku, or killed both of them. Eventually, Senhime was sent back to the Tokugawa clan alive. With the Toyotomi line finally extinguished, no threats remained to the Tokugawa clan's domination of Japan.

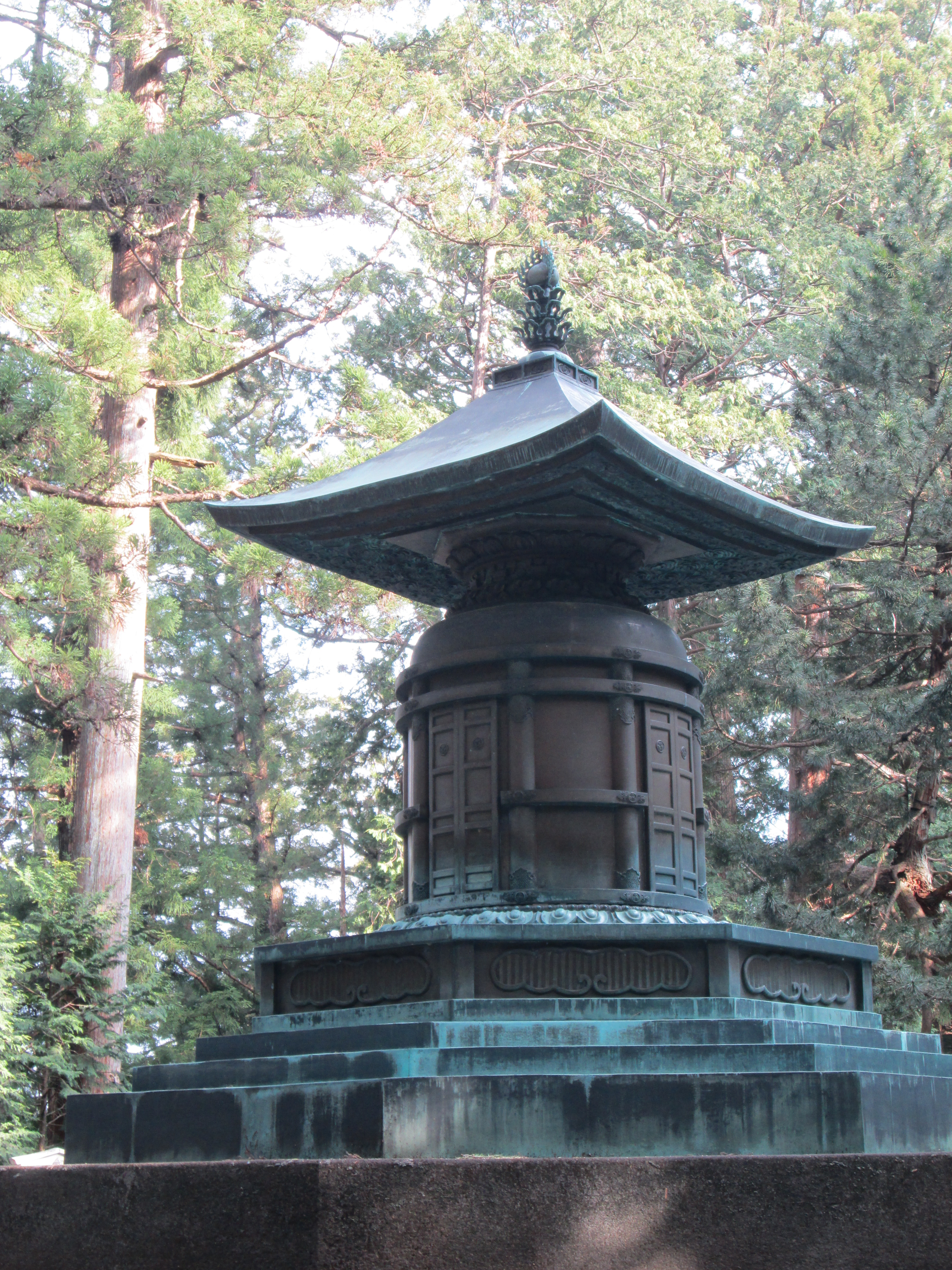
The tomb of Tokugawa Ieyasu in Nikkō Tōshō-gū

=== Final year and death ===
After the conflict with Toyotomi Hideyori, Ieyasu implemented the Buke shohatto code, which stated that each daimyo lord was only allowed to possess one castle.

In 1616, Tokugawa Ieyasu died at the age of 73. The cause of death is thought to have been cancer or syphilis. The first Tokugawa shōgun was posthumously deified with the name Tōshō Daigongen (東照大權現), the "Great Gongen, Light of the East". (A Gongen is believed to be a buddha who has appeared on Earth in the shape of a kami to save sentient beings). In life, Ieyasu had expressed the wish to be deified after his death to protect his descendants from evil. His remains were buried at the Gongens' mausoleum at Kunōzan, Kunōzan Tōshō-gū (久能山東照宮). Many people believe that after the first anniversary of his death, his remains were reburied at Nikkō Shrine, Nikkō Tōshō-gū (日光東照宮), and that his remains are still there. Neither shrine has offered to open the graves, and the location of Ieyasu's physical remains is still a mystery. The mausoleum's architectural style became known as gongen-zukuri, that is gongen-style.

He was first given the Buddhist name Tosho Dai-Gongen (東照大權現), then, after his death, it was changed to Hogo Onkokuin (法號安國院). During this time, the chief physician who cared for him, Sotetsu Katayama, diagnosed Ieyasu with stomach cancer. However, Ieyasu misinterpreted Katayama's diagnosis of his illness as a tapeworm infestation. Thus, he did not take the medicine Sotetsu had prepared, and instead continued his own method of therapy which he believed could cure his perceived tapeworm problem. This resulted in Ieyasu's health continually deteriorating.

Although his son, Hidetada, also warned him about his medical method, this only served to anger Ieyasu, who arrogantly overvalued his own knowledge in the medical field. This conflict over his medical care ended when Ieyasu exiled Sotetsu to the Shinshu Takashima Domain.

At the time of his death, Ieyasu had an estimated personal wealth of about 4 million koku, which extended to 8 million koku for the total of the Tokugawa clan. He also possessed about 42 tons of gold as the Tokugawa shogunate had implemented the centralization of gold and silver mine ownership, unlike previous eras of government in Japan, in which possession of mine ownership was managed by local lords through the shogunate authorization.

The Tokugawa shogunate would rule Japan for the next 260 years.

== Personal information ==
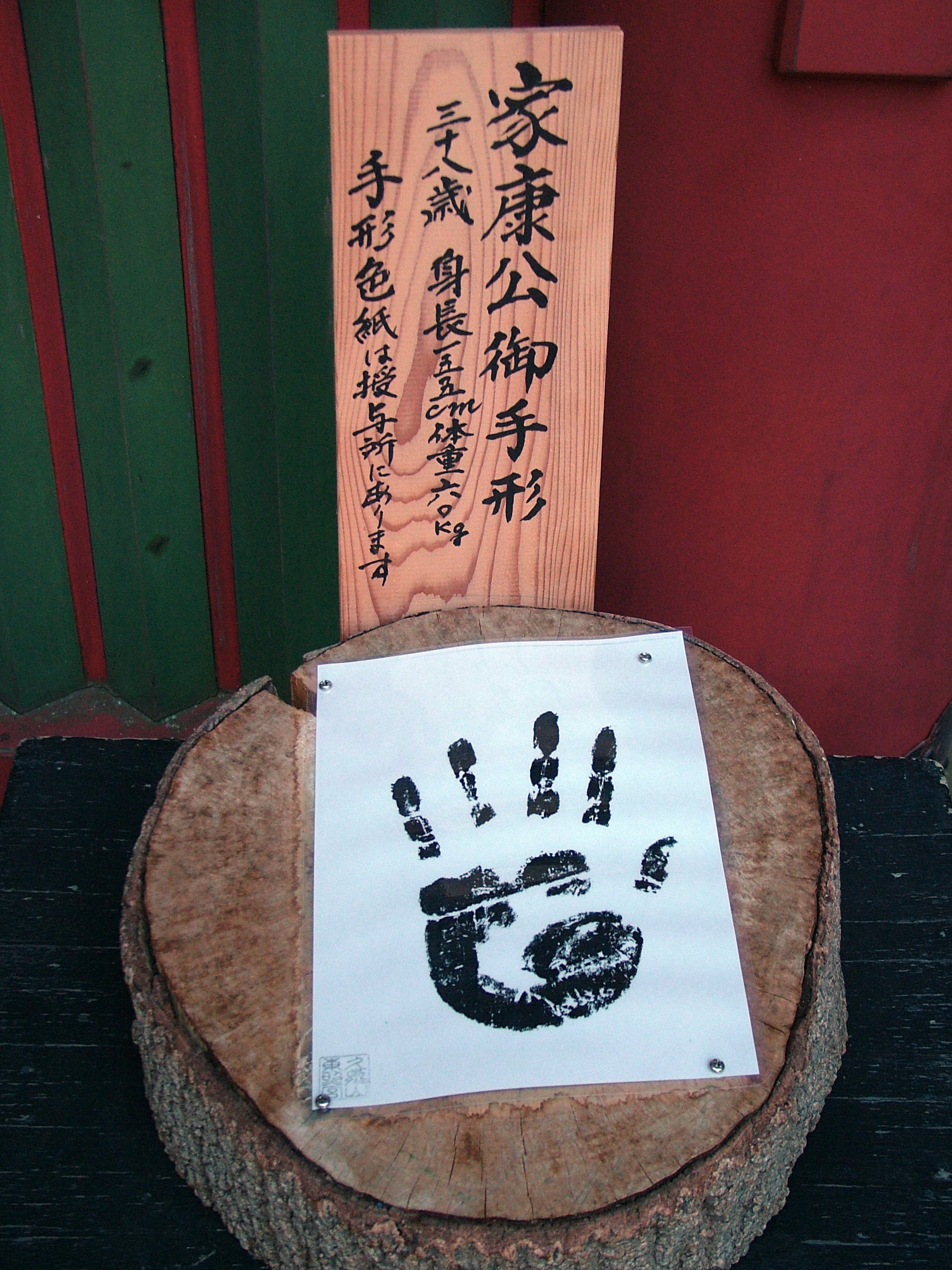
Handprint of Tokugawa Ieyasu at Kunōzan Tōshō-gū

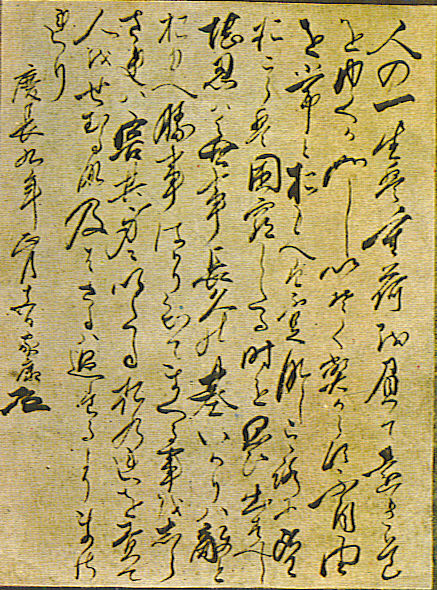
Precepts on the secret of success in life drafted by Tokugawa Ieyasu from the collection of Nikkō Tōshō-gū

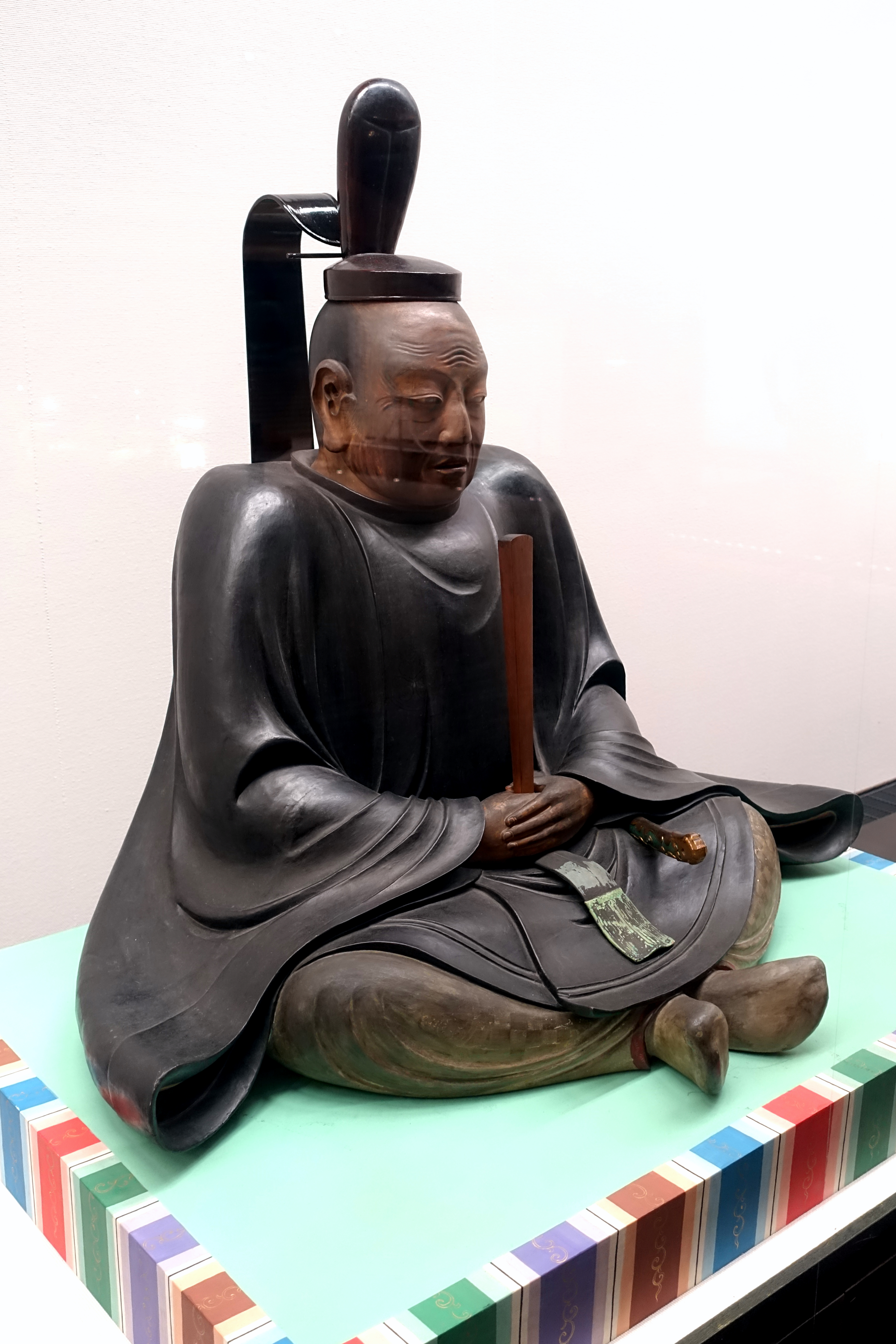
Wooden statue of Ieyasu at Edo-Tokyo Museum.

A historical evaluation of Ieyasu by Junji Mitsunari, a historian on the faculty at Kyushu University, has compared Ieyasu's upbringing to that of another Sengoku era leader, Mōri Terumoto. Mitsunari contrasted Terumoto's upbringing in the comfortable and stable domains of the Mōri clan, as opposed to the hardships Ieyasu faced during his childhood, in which he experienced instability in Mikawa province, spending much of his youth as a hostage of other warlords. In Mitsunari's view these differences formed each leader's character, as reflected in the Sekigahara battle, where the indecisiveness of Terumoto cost the Western army greatly, while Ieyasu's bold decisions and his willingness to take risks gave him the edge during the war.

John T. Kuehn saw Ieyasu as being capable of complex long game strategies, both politically and militarily, as shown during his conflict against Ishida Mitsunari. Kuehn saw the Siege of Fushimi Castle as Ieyasu's deliberate strategy to sacrifice the castle and to bait Mitsunari into a set-piece battle, where his battle-hardened forces had an advantage over Mitsunari's forces.

On the other hand, Kazuto Hongō has compared Ieyasu to Nobunaga as Ieyasu had insight to ensure the stability of the nation by the optimization and utilization of the abilities of his vassals rather than relying on the power of single individuals, as well as establishing succession systems. Tetsuo Owada personally praised how Ieyasu managed to be quickly accepted by the citizens of the Kantō region and his ability to rule there without unrest after he transferred there, by continuing the lenient tax policies of the Hōjō clan in order to gain sympathy.

Hamada Koichiro from Himeji Dokkyo University has recorded that there is a systematic attempt of historiography studies in the aftermath of the Meiji Restoration to portray Ieyasu in a negative light as a "cunning old man" who used the temple's bell of Hokoji as casus belli to wage war against Hideyori. Koichiro saw this tendency of Ieyasu to resort to underhanded tactics as being quite justified to some extent for different reasons. One example was his attempt at suppressing the Mikawa Ikkō-ikki rebellion by breaking his promise of leniency to Jōdo Shinshū's followers in exchange for their surrender. However, Koichiro points out that Ieyasu was also capable of bravery as shown by his personally entering the battlefield during the rebellion. He also points out several anecdotes about Ieyasu as a youth which show he had promise as a capable military tactician when he was still under the wing of the Imagawa clan.

Tokugawa is also known for his vindictiveness. It is said that Ieyasu once executed a man who came within his power because he had insulted him when Ieyasu was young.

According to professor Watanabe Daimon, one of the biggest strengths of Ieyasu's policies was his benevolence towards his subordinates and his capability to forgive his enemies and even his own generals who betrayed him during the Mikawa Ikkō-ikki uprising. This allowed him to gain the loyalty of the Mikawa samurai clans. As an example, during the battle of Mikatagahara, those who shielded Ieyasu, and even gave their lives to allow his retreat, were the ones who had once fought against Ieyasu in the past and had been pardoned.

At the same time, he was also ruthless when crossed. For example, he ordered the executions of his first wife and his eldest son, a son-in-law of Oda Nobunaga; Nobunaga was also an uncle of Hidetada's wife Oeyo. According to George Sansom, Ieyasu was cruel, relentless and merciless in the elimination of Toyotomi survivors after the Siege of Osaka. For days, scores of men and women were hunted down and executed, including an eight-year-old son of Toyotomi Hideyori by a concubine, who was beheaded. However, Ieyasu was also known to be capable of forgiveness, such as how he gave pardon to Watanabe Moritsuna after he rebelled against Ieyasu during the Ikkō-ikki uprisings in Mikawa.

Unlike Toyotomi Hideyoshi, he harbored no desires to conquer outside of Japan, only wanting to bring order, an end to open warfare, and to rule Japan.

Ieyasu's favorite pastime was falconry. He regarded it as excellent training for a warrior.

"When you go into the country hawking, you learn to understand the military spirit and also the hard life of the lower classes. You exercise your muscles and train your limbs. You have any amount of walking and running and become quite indifferent to heat and cold, and so you are little likely to suffer from any illness."

Ieyasu swam often; even late in his life he is reported to have swum in the moat of Edo Castle.

=== Armors & weapons ===
Many sets of armors are said to have been used by Ieyasu, and at least 10 pieces of armor were used by Ieyasu during his life and recorded in history.

While warlords at the time preferred flashy armor and frontlets to show off their presence, the 'Hada Gusoku' armor used by Ieyasu in the Siege of Osaka is a jet black armor with very few decorations, and is said to represent Ieyasu's frugal personality.

Like Hideyoshi, Ieyasu also presented armor to Europe, and there is a record of the "Moji-i Domaru Armor" at Ambras Castle in Austria being a gift from "the Emperor and Empress of Japan to Holy Roman Emperor Rudolf II." This armor has the same characteristics as the aforementioned "Hanairo Hinomaru-i Domaru Armor" and armor presented by Hidetada to King James I of England in 1613, and it is believed to have been presented by Ieyasu between 1608 and 1612. The armor has the characters for World (天下, tenka) on the front of the torso and left sleeve, and Peace (太平, taihei) on the back of the torso and right sleeve, woven with red thread.

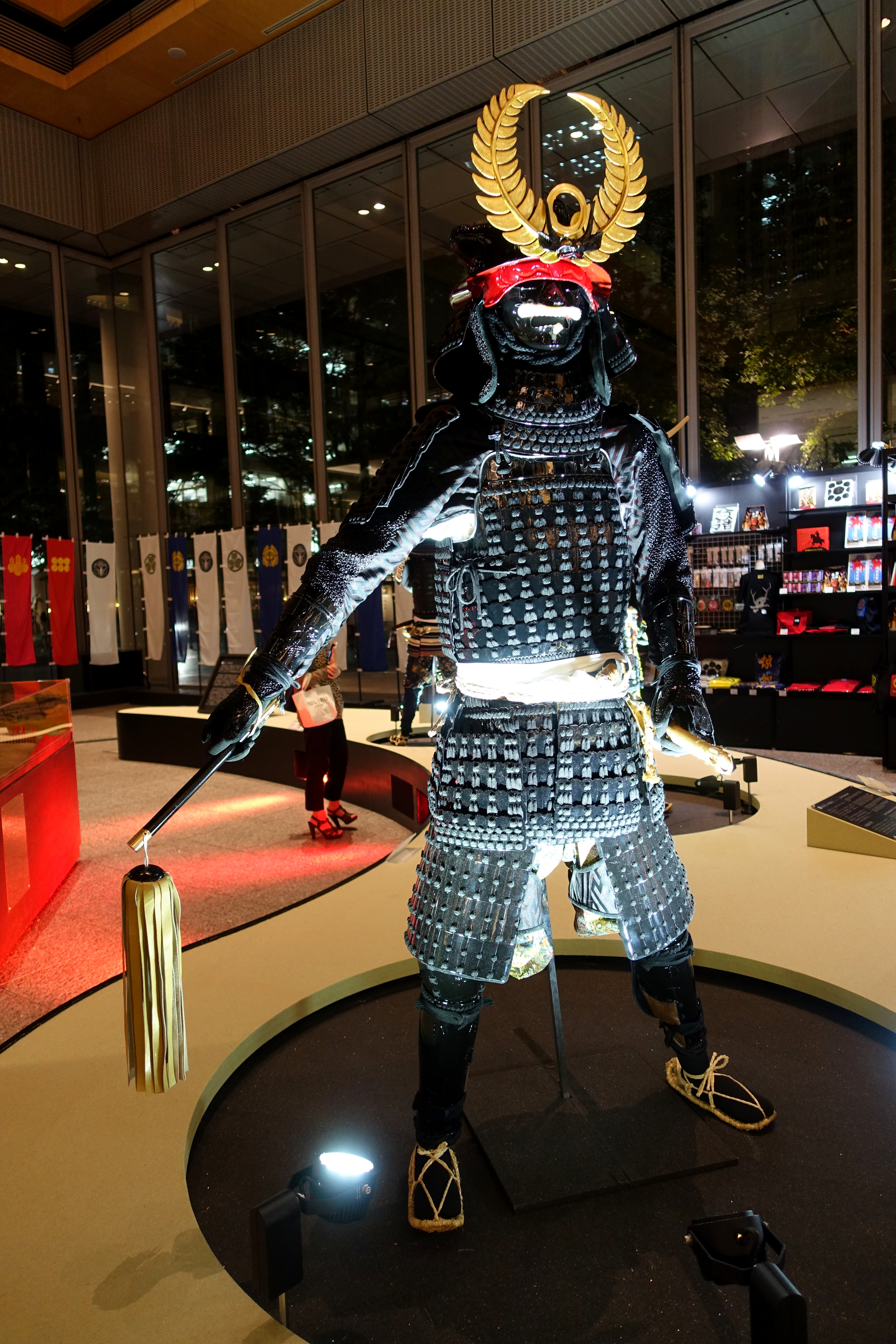
Replica of Ieyasu armor

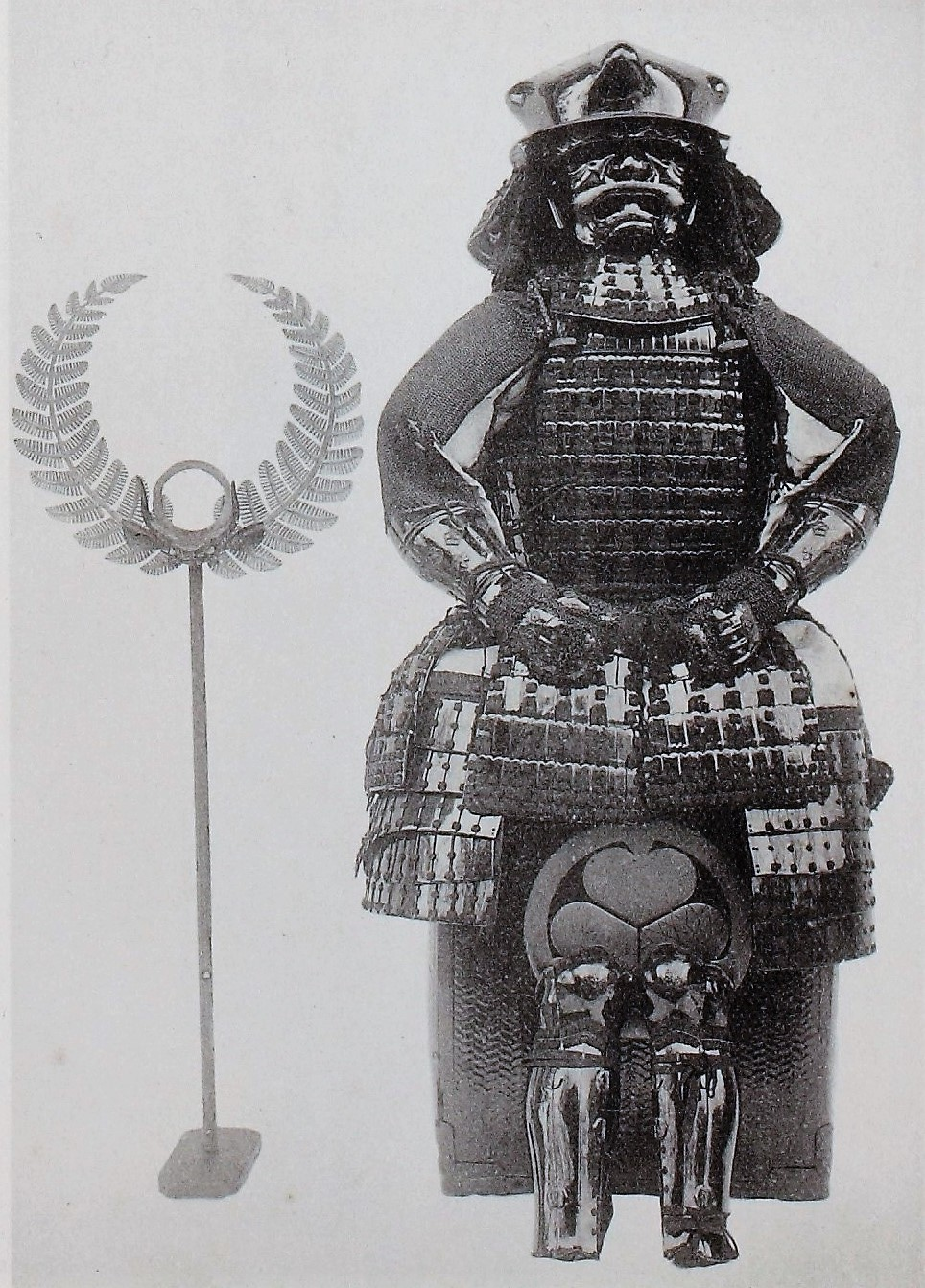
Armor of Tokugawa Ieyasu at Kunōzan Tōshō-gū

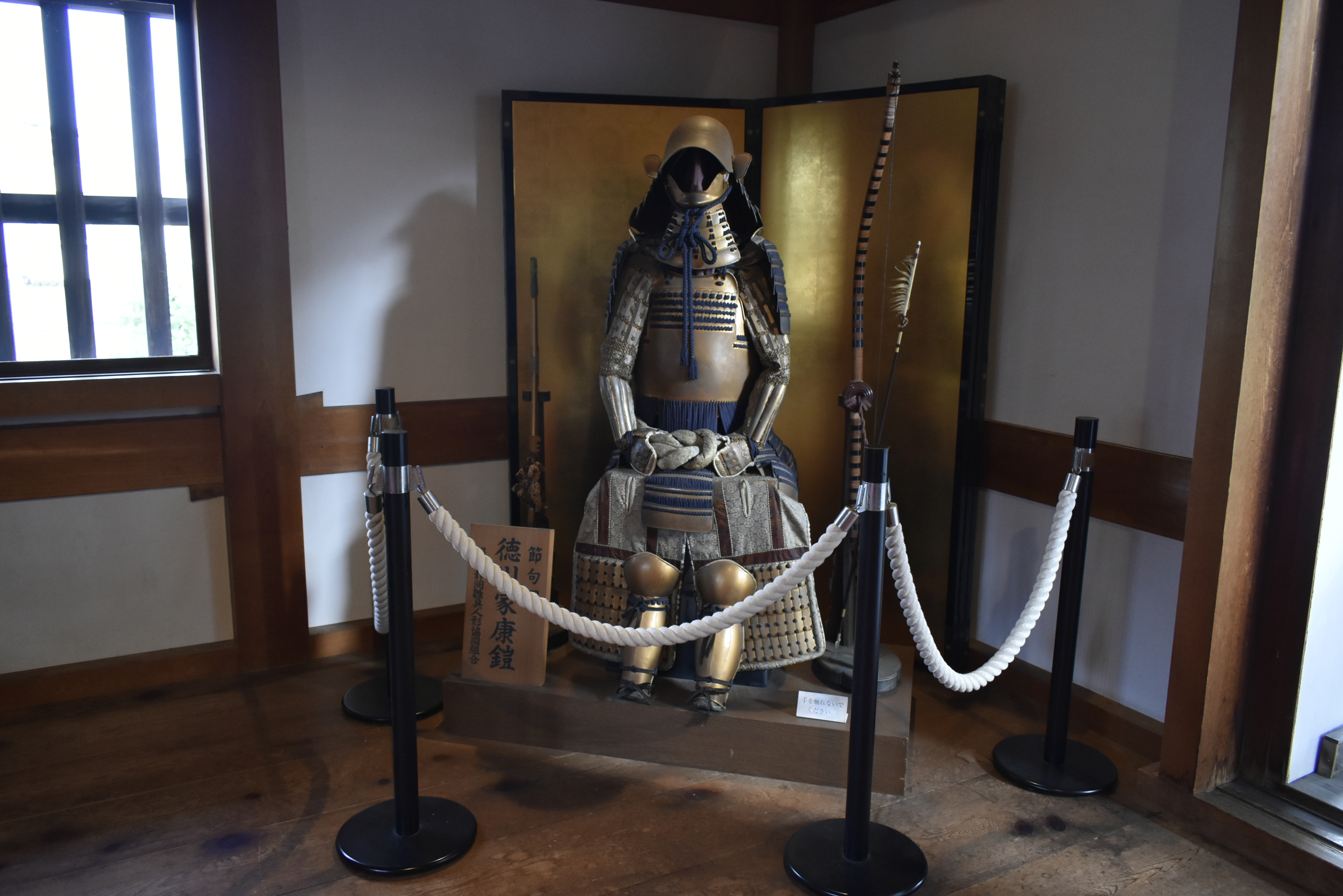
Golden Kindami gusoku armor of Ieyasu in Sunpu castle

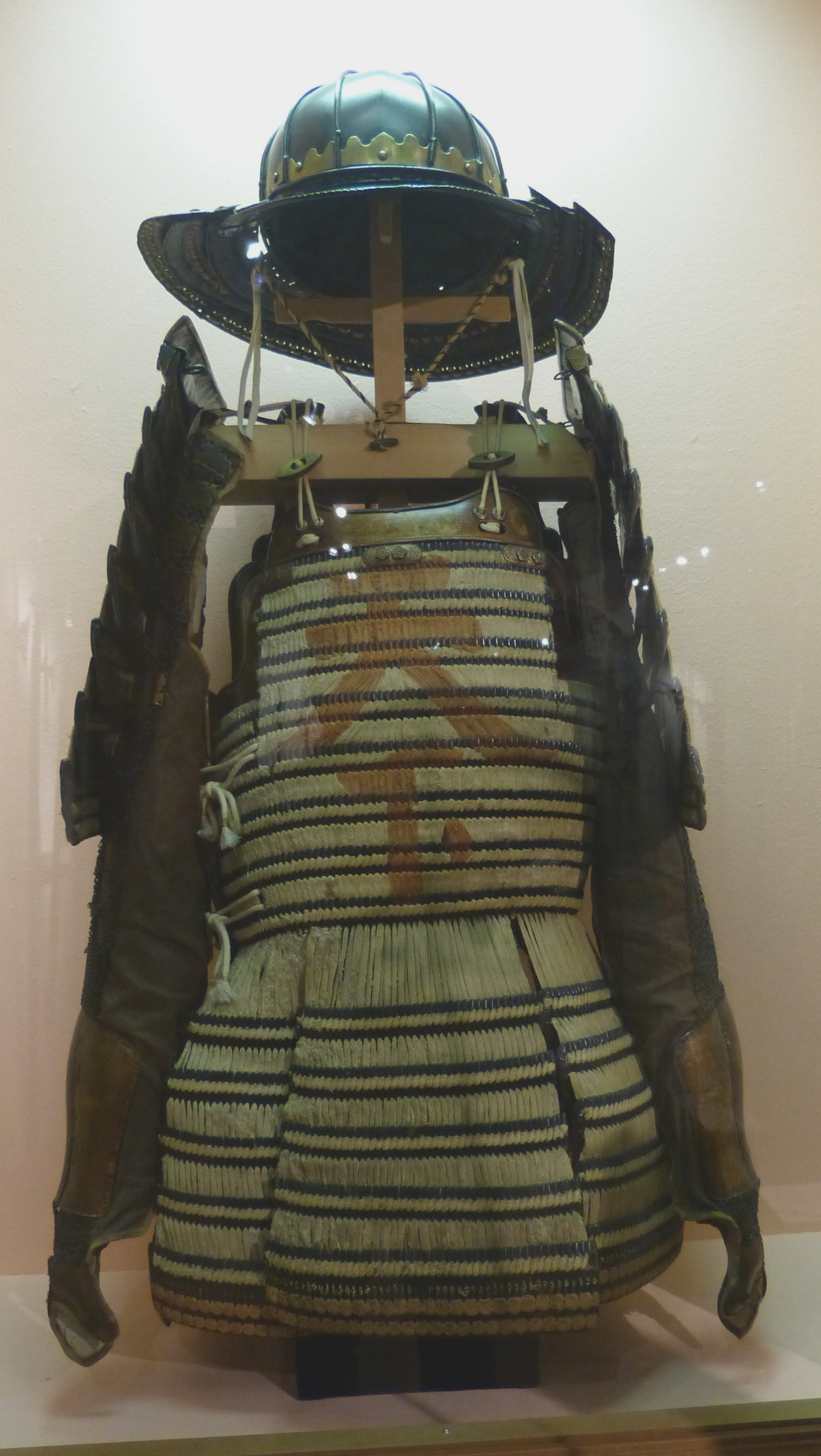
Domaru armor with calligraphy

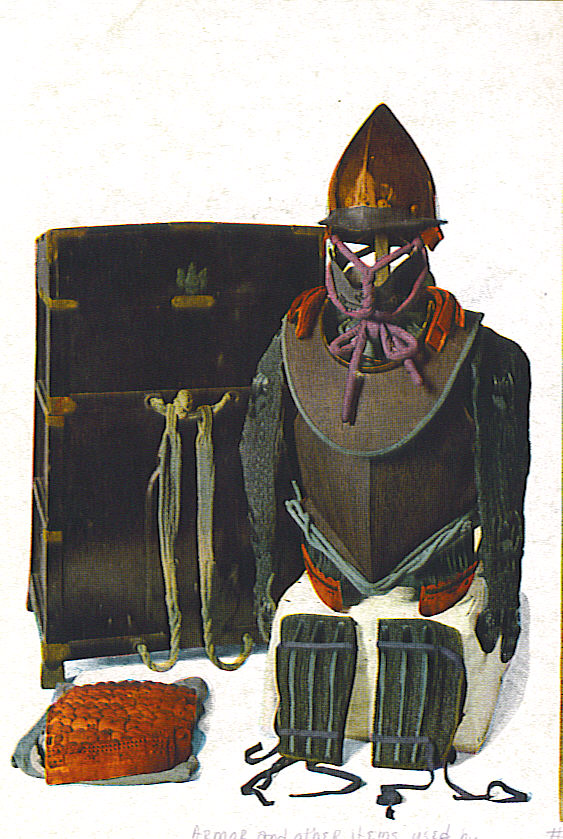
Ieyasu's Western-style armor, believed to be worn by Ieyasu in the battle of Sekigahara

=== Quotes ===
Life is like unto a long journey with a heavy burden. Let thy step be slow and steady, that thou stumble not. Persuade thyself that imperfection and inconvenience are the lot of natural mortals, and there will be no room for discontent, neither for despair. When ambitious desires arise in thy heart, recall the days of extremity thou hast passed through. Forbearance is the root of all quietness and assurance forever. Look upon the wrath of thy enemy. If thou only knowest what it is to conquer, and knowest not what it is to be defeated; woe unto thee, it will fare ill with thee. Find fault with thyself rather than with others.

The strong manly ones in life are those who understand the meaning of the word patience. Patience means restraining one's inclinations. There are seven emotions: joy, anger, anxiety, adoration, grief, fear, and hate, and if a man does not give way to these he can be called patient. I am not as strong as I might be, but I have long known and practiced patience. And if my descendants wish to be as I am, they must study patience.

It is said that he fought, as a warrior or a general, in 90 battles.

He was interested in various kenjutsu skills, was a patron of the Yagyū Shinkage-ryū school, and also had them as his personal sword instructors.

=== Religion ===
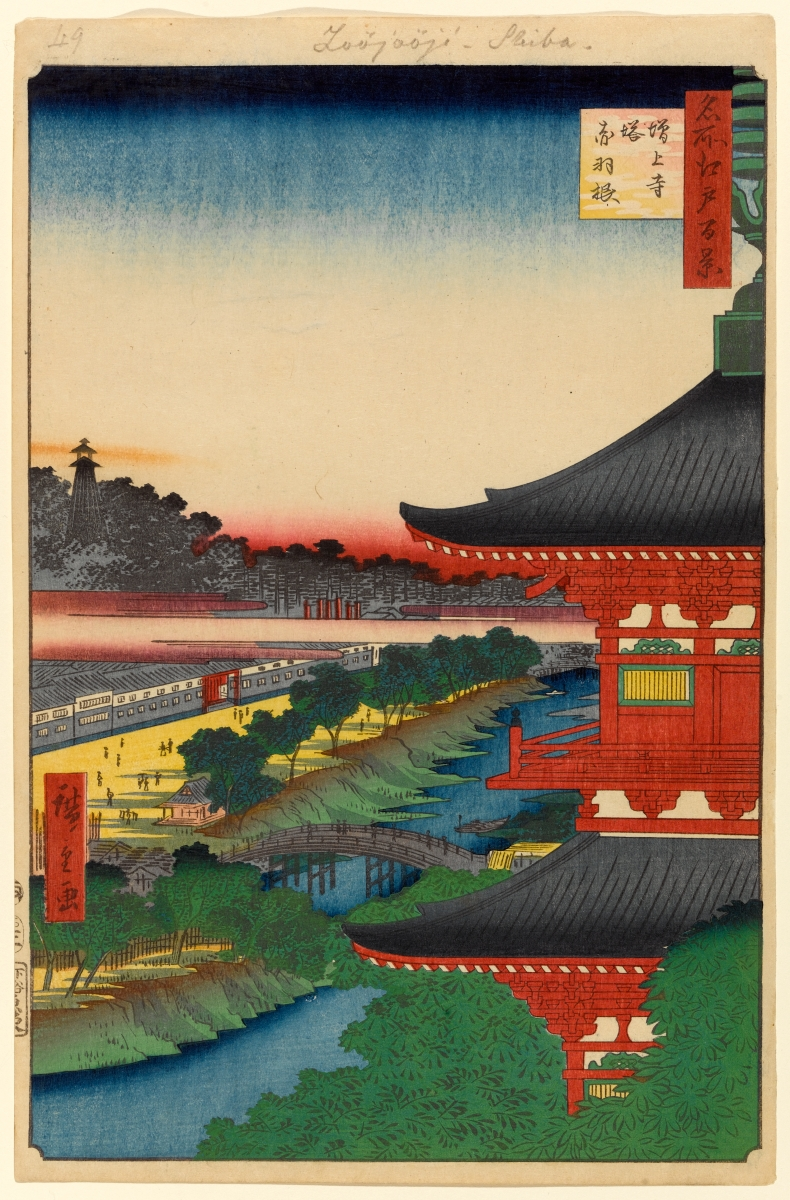
The familial temple of Tokugawa Ieyasu, Zōjō-ji, as depicted by Hiroshige in 1857

Tokugawa Ieyasu was known for his devotion to the Jōdo-shū school of Buddhism throughout his life, having been born into the Matsudaira clan which followed Jōdō Buddhism. As a way of demonstrating his constant favor towards the sect, he moved his familial temple to the Zōjō-ji Temple in Edo and funded massive renovations to older Jōdo temples, including the head temple of Chion-in in Kyoto, while also financing the creation of several new temples. After confiding in the abbot of Zōjō-ji temple about wanting to become a deity to protect his country, he was given advice to regularly recite the nembutsu for the purpose of being born into Amida Buddha's Pure Land of Sukhavati, where he would be able to easily attain Buddhahood and protect his descendants and the entire nation of Japan. Ieyasu readily accepted this advice, and constantly repeated the nembutsu until the day he died. Despite his personal devotion to Jōdo-shū, Ieyasu was not a strict sectarian, placing his secretary Denchōrō, a Rinzai Zen monk, in charge of all religious affairs in Japan, Buddhist and Shinto alike.

Later in life he also took to scholarship and Confucianism, patronizing scholars like Hayashi Razan.

While at first tolerant of Christianity, his attitude changed after 1613, and persecution of Christians sharply increased. In 1613, Ieyasu sent the monk Banzui'i to Kyushu to convert Christians there to Buddhism, and in 1614 he completely banned Catholicism. The hostility of Ieyasu towards Catholics was shown when he replaced Jesuit translator João Rodrigues Tçuzu with William Adams in his court. This change of attitude is believed to be due to the Okamoto Daihachi incident, where a Catholic daimyo and shogun's official were accused of a series of crimes. After the execution of Daihachi, Ieyasu reportedly said:

If they see a condemned fellow, they run to him with joy, bow to him, and do him reverence. This they say is the essence of their belief. If this is not an evil law, what is it? They truly are the enemies of the Gods and of Buddha.

=== Honours ===
- Senior First Rank (April 14, 1617; posthumously)

== Family ==
=== Parents ===
| Status | Image | Name | Posthumous Name | Birth | Death | Parents |
|---|---|---|---|---|---|---|
| Father | | Matsudaira Hirotada | Oseidokantokoji | | | Matsudaira Kiyoyasu; Aoki family's daughter |
| Mother | | Odai no Kata | | | October 13, 1602 | Mizuno Tadamasa; Otomi-no-Kata |

=== Siblings ===
==== Mother Side ====
| Image | Name | Posthumous Name | Birth | Death | Father | Marriage | Issue |
|---|---|---|---|---|---|---|---|
| | Matsudaira Yasumoto of Sekiyado Domain | Daiko-in-dono sugurudensoeidaikoji | 1552 | September 19, 1603 | Hisamatsu Toshikatsu (1526–1587) | | Matsudaira Tadayoshi (1582–1624) of Ōgaki Domain; Matsudaira Masayoshi; Matsudaira Yasuhisa; Matsudaira Nobusuke (d.1655); Dōsen-in married Okabe Nagamori (1568–1632) of Ōgaki Domain; Ryuko-in married Suganuma Sadayori (1576–1605) of Nagashima Domain; Matehime (1598–1638) married Fukushima Masayuki (1858–1602) later married Tsugaru Nobuhira of Hirosaki Domain; Tsubakihime married Tanaka Tadamasa (1585–1620) of Yanagawa Domain later married Matsudaira Narishige (1594–1633) of Tamba-Kameyama Domain; Shoshitsu’in married Osuga Tadamasa (1581–1607) of Yokosuka Domain later married Suganuma Sadayoshi (1587–1643) of Tamba-Kameyama Domain; Jomyo-in married Nakamura Kazutada (1590–1609) of Yonogo Domain later married Mōri Hidemoto of Chofu Domain |
| | Matsudaira Yasutoshi | | 1552 | April 2, 1586 | Hisamatsu Toshikatsu (1526–1587) | | Daughter married Matsudaira Katsumasa |
| | Hisamatsu Sadakatsu | Sogen-in-dono denyonshinatsugishoukugaentodaikoji | | | Hisamatsu Toshikatsu (1526–1587) | Okudaira Tatsu, Okudaira Sadatomo (d.1585)’s daughter | Matsudaira Sadayoshi (1585–1603); Matsudaira Sadayuki (1587–1668) of Kuwana Domain; Matsudaira Sadatsuna (1592–1625) of Kuwana Domain; Matsudaira Sadazane (1597–1632); Matsudaira Sadafusa (1604–1676) of Imabari Domain; Matsudaira Sadamasa (1610–1673) of Kariya Domain; Matsuohime married Hattori Masanari; Kumahime (1595–1632) married Yamauchi Tadayoshi (1592–1665) of Tosa Domain; Daughter married Nakagawa Hisanori (1594–1653) of Oka Domain; Kikuhime married Sakai Tadayuki (1599–1636) of Maebashi Domain; Shōjuin Married Abe Shigetsugu (1598–1651) of Iwatsuki Domain; Tamako married Ikeda Tsunemoto (1611–1671) of Yamasaki Domain |
| | Take-hime | Chogen-in | 1553 | July 28, 1618 | Hisamatsu Toshikatsu (1526–1587) | First: Matsudaira Tadamasa (1543–1577) of Sakurai-Matsudaira clan Second: Matsudaira Tadayoshi (1559–1582) of Sakurai-Matsudaira clan Third: Hoshina Masanao | By First: Matsudaira Iehiro (1577–1601) of Musashi-Matsuyama Domain; By Second: Matsudaira Nobuyoshi (1580–1620) of Sasayama Domain; Matsudaira Tadayori of Hamamatsu Domain; By Third: Hoshina Masasada of Iino Domain; Hojo Ujishige (1595–1658) of Kakegawa Domain; Seigen’in married Anbe Nobumori (1584–1674) of Okabe Domain; Yōhime (1591–1664) married Koide Yoshihide (1587–1666) of Izushi Domain; Eihime (1585–1635) married Kuroda Nagamasa of Fukuoka Domain; Kōun-in married Kato Akinari (1592–1661) of Aizu Domain |
| | Matsuhime | | | | Hisamatsu Toshikatsu (1526–1587) | Matsudaira Yasunaga (1562–1633) of Matsumoto Domain | Matsudaira Nagakane (1580–1619); Matsudaira Tadamitsu (1562–1633); Matsudaira Yasunao (1617–1634) of Akashi Domain |
| | | Tenkeiin | | | Hisamatsu Toshikatsu (1526–1587) | Matsudaira Iekiyo of Yoshida Domain | Matsudaira Tadakiyo (1585–1612) of Yoshida Domain |

=== Wives and concubines ===
| Status | Image | Name | Posthumous Name | Birth | Death | Parents | Issue |
|---|---|---|---|---|---|---|---|
| First Wife | | Tsukiyama-dono | Shoge-in | | September 19, 1579 | Sekiguchi Chikanaga (1518–1562); Ii Naohira's daughter | Matsudaira Nobuyasu |
| Second Wife | | Asahi no kata | Nanmeiin | 1543 | February 18, 1590 | | |
| Concubine | | Nishigori no Tsubone | Rensho-in | | June 19, 1606 | Udono Nagamochi (1513–1557) | Tokuhime (Tokugawa) married Hojo Ujinao later to Ikeda Terumasa of Himeji Domain |
| Concubine | | Shimoyama-dono | Moshin’in | 1564 | November 21, 1591 | Akiyama Torayasu | Takeda Nobuyoshi of Mito Domain |
| Concubine | | Kageyama-dono | Youjuin | 1580 | October 13, 1653 | Masaki Yoritada (1551–1622); Hojo Ujitaka (d.1609)’s daughter | Tokugawa Yorinobu of Kishu Domain; Tokugawa Yorifusa of Mito Domain |
| Concubine | | Kotoku-no-Tsubone | Chōshō-in | 1548 | January 10, 1620 | Nagami Sadahide | Yuki Hideyasu of Fukui Domain |
| Concubine | | Saigō-no-Tsubone | | 1552 | July 1, 1589 | Tozuka Tadaharu; Saigo Masakatsu's daughter | |
| Concubine | | Otake no Kata | Ryōun-in | 1555 | April 7, 1637 | Ichikawa Masanaga | Furi-hime (1580–1617) married Gamō Hideyuki of Aizu Domain later to Asano Nagaakira of Hiroshima Domain |
| Concubine | | Chaa-no-Tsubone | Chokoin | | July 30, 1621 | | Matsudaira Tadateru of Takada Domain; Matsudaira Matsuchiyo of Fukaya Domain |
| Concubine | | Onatsu no Kata | Seiun’in | 1581 | October 24, 1660 | Hasegawa Fujinao | |
| Concubine | | Okaji no Kata | Eishō-in | December 7, 1578 | September 17, 1642 | Ota Yasusuke (1531–1581) | Ichihime (1607–1610) |
| Concubine | | Oume no Kata | Renge-in | 1586 | October 8, 1647 | Aoki Kazunori (d.1600) | |
| Concubine | | Acha no Tsubone | Unkoin | March 16, 1555 | February 16, 1637 | Ida Naomasa | |
| Concubine | | Omusu no Kata | Shōei-in | | July 26, 1692 | Mitsui Yoshimasa | Stillborn (1592) |
| Concubine | | Okame no Kata | Sōōin | 1573 | October 9, 1642 | Shimizu Munekiyo | Matsudaira Senchiyo (1595–1600); Tokugawa Yoshinao of Owari Domain |
| Concubine | | Osen no Kata | Taiei-in | | November 30, 1619 | Miyazaki Yasukage | |
| Concubine | | Oroku no Kata | Yōgen'in | 1597 | May 4, 1625 | Kuroda Naojin | |
| Concubine | | Ohisa no Kata | Fushōin | | March 24, 1617 | Mamiya Yasutoshi (1518–1590) | Matsuhime (1595–1598) |
| Concubine | | Tomiko | Shinju-in | | August 7, 1628 | Yamada clan | |
| Concubine | | Omatsu no Kata | Hōkōin | | | | |
| Concubine | | | | | | Sanjo Clan | |
| Concubine | | | | | | Matsudaira Shigetoshi (1498–1589) | |

=== Children ===
| Image | Name | Posthumous Name | Birth | Death | Mother | Marriage | Issue |
|---|---|---|---|---|---|---|---|
| | Matsudaira Nobuyasu | Toun-in-dono ryugenchokookyoshiseiroji-dono densanshutegensensudaikoji | | | | | Tokuhime (1576–1607) married Ogasawara Hidemasa (1569–1615) of Matsumoto domain Kamehime (1577–1626) married Honda Tadamasa of Himeji Domain; By Concubine: Banchiyo |
| | Kamehime | | | | | | |
| | Toku-hime | Ryōshō-in | | | Nishigori no Tsubone | | by First: Manshuin-dono (1593); Manhime (d. 1602); Senhime (b. 1596) married Kyokogu Takahiro (1599–1677) of Miyazu Domain; By Second: Ikeda Tadatsugu (1599–1615) of Okayama Domain; Ikeda Tadakatsu (1602–1632) of Okayama Domain; Ikeda Teruzumi (1604–1662) of Shikano Domain; Ikeda Masatsuna (1605–1631) Of Akō Domain; Furihime (1607–1659) married Date Tadamune of Sendai Domain; Ikeda Teruoki (1611–1647) Of Akō Domain |
| | Yuki Hideyasu | Jokoin-dono shingendoyounseidaikoji | | | Kotoku-no-Tsubone | Tsuruko, Edo Shigemichi's daughter | |
| | Tokugawa Hidetada | | May 2, 1579 | | | | |
| | Matsudaira Tadayoshi | Shokoin-dono keneigenmodaikoji | | | | | |
| | Furi-hime | Shōsei-in | 1580 | September 27, 1617 | Otake no Kata | First: Gamō Hideyuki of Aizu Domain; Second: Asano Nagaakira of Hiroshima Domain | By first: Gamō Tadasato (1602–1627) of Aizu Domain; Gamō Tadatomo (1604–1634) of Iyo-Matsuyama Domain; Yorihime (1602–1656) married Kato Tadahiro (1601–1653) of Dewa-Maruoka Domain; By Second: Asano Mitsuakira of Hiroshima Domain |
| | Takeda Nobuyoshi | Joken-in-dono eiyozenkyozugendaizenjomon | | | Shimoyama-dono | Tenshoin, Kinoshita Katsutoshi's daughter | |
| | Matsudaira Tadateru | Shorin-in-dono shinyokisogesendaikoji | | | | | |
| | Matsudaira Matsuchiyo | Eishoin-dono | | | | | |
| | Matsudaira Senchiyo | Kogakuin-dono kesoiyodaidoji | April 22, 1595 | March 21, 1600 | Okame no Kata | | |
| | Matsuhime | | 1595 | 1598 | Ohisa no Kata | | |
| | Tokugawa Yoshinao | | | | | | By Concubines: Tokugawa Mitsutomo of Owari Domain; Kyōhime (1626–1674) married Hirohata Tadayuki (1624–1669) |
| | Tokugawa Yorinobu | Nanryuin-dono nihonzeneaiyotenkotakoji | | | | | by Concubines: Tokugawa Mitsusada of Kishu Domain; Shuri Matsudaira Yorizumi (1641–1711) of Saijō Domain; Inabahime (1631–1709) married Ikeda Mitsunaka (1630–1693) of Tottori Domain; Matsuhime married Matsudaira Nobuhira (1636–1689) of Takatsukasa-Matsudaira Clan |
| | Tokugawa Yorifusa | | | | | | |
| | Ichi-hime | Seiun’in | January 28, 1607 | March 7, 1610 | Okaji no Kata | | |

=== Speculated children ===
| Image | Name | Posthumous Name | Birth | Death | Mother | Marriage | Issue |
|---|---|---|---|---|---|---|---|
| | Suzuki Ichizo | | September 10, 1556 | | Daughter of Hatago of post station in Totoumi Province | | |
| | Nagami Sadachika | | March 1, 1574 | January 5, 1605 | Kotoku-no-Tsubone | Nagami clan's daughter | Nagami Sadayasu |
| | Matsudaira Minbu | | 1582 | 1616 | Omatsu-no-Kata | | |
| | Ogasawara Gonnojō | | 1589 | May 7, 1615 | Sanjo Clan | Kondo Hidemochi (1547–1631) of Iinoya Domain's daughter | Son; Daughter married Mamiya Nobukatsu; Daughter married Nakagawa Tadayuki |
| | Ii Naotaka | Kyūshō-in-dono Gōtokuten'eidaikoji | | | | | |
| | Doi Toshikatsu | Hōchiin-dono denshuhoonyotaiokyogendaikoji | | | | Matsudaira Chikakiyo's daughter | By concubines: Doi Toshitaka (1619–1685) of Koga Domain; Doi Katsumasa; Doi Toshinaga (1631–1696) of Nishio Domain; Doi Toshifusa (1631–1683) of Ōno Domain; Doi Toshinao (1637–1677) of Ōwa Domain; Katsuhime married Ikoma Takatoshi of Yashima Domain; Kazuhime married Hori Naotsugu (1614–1638) of Murakami Domain; Katsuhime married Matsudaira Yorishige of Takamatsu Domain; Inuhime married Inoue Yoshimasa; Kahime married Nasu Sukemitsu (1628–1687) of Karasuyama Domain |
| | Goto Hiroyo | | Juny 24, 1606 | March 14, 1680 | Ohashi-no-Tsubone, Aoyama Masanaga's daughter | | |
| | Tokugawa Iemitsu | | | | Lady Kasuga | | By concubines: Chiyohime (1637–1699) married Tokugawa Mitsutomo of Owari Domain; Tokugawa Ietsuna, 4th Shogun; Kamematsu (1643–1647); Tokugawa Tsunashige of Kofu Domain; Tokugawa Tsunayoshi, 5th Shogun; Tsurumatsu (1647–1648) |

=== Adopted children ===
| Image | Name | Posthumous Name | Birth | Death | Parents | Marriage | Issue |
|---|---|---|---|---|---|---|---|
| | Komatsuhime | Dairen-in | 1573 | Mar 27, 1620 | Honda Tadakatsu; Ohisa no Kata | Sanada Nobuyuki of Matsushiro Domain | Manhime (b. 1592) married Kōriki Tadafusa of Shimabara Domain; Kenju-in married Sakuma Katsumune; Sanada Nobumasa of Matsushiro Domain; Sanada Nobushige (1599–1648) of Hanishina Domain |
| | Tokuhime | Minetaka-in | 1576 | 1607 | Okazaki Nobuyasu; Tokuhime | Ogasawara Hidemasa (1569–1615) | Manhime (1592–1666) married Hachisuka Yoshishige of Tokushima Domain; Ogasawara Tadanaga (1595–1615); Ogasawara Tadazane (1596–1667); Hōju-in (1597–1649); Ogasawara Tadatomo (1599–1663); Matsudaira Shigenao (1601–1643); Ogasawara Tadayoshi; Ogasawara Nagatoshi |
| | Matsudaira Ieharu | Torin’in dokaisosakudaizenzomon | 1579 | April 15, 1592 | Okudaira Nobumasa of Kano Domain; Kamehime | | |
| | Kanahime | Shōjō-in | 1582 | Nov 3, 1656 | Mizuno Tadashige (1541–1600); Tsuzuki Yoshitoyo's daughter | Katō Kiyomasa (1562–1611) of Kumamoto Domain | |
| | Renhime | Chōju-in | 1582 | August 24, 1652 | Matsudaira Yasunao (1569–1593) of Fukaya Domain; Honda Hirotaka's daughter | Arima Toyouji (1569–1642) of Kurume Domain | Arima Tadayori (1603–1655) of Kurume Domain; Arima Nobukata; Arima Yoritsugu (1611–1649) |
| | Okudaira Tadamasa | Oyamahoei Kokoku-in | | | | Yoshun’in-dono, Satomi Yoshiyori (1543–1587)’s daughter | Okudaira Tadataka (1608–1632) of Kano Domain |
| | Matsudaira Tadaaki | Tenshoin shingangentetsudaikoji | | | | first: Oda Nobukane of Kaibara Domain's daughter Second: Koide Yoshimasa (1565–1613) of Izushi Domain's daughter | From Concubines: Matsudaira Tadahiro (1631–1700) of Yamagata Domain; Matsudaira Kiyomichi (1634–1645) of Himejishinden Domain; Murihime married Nabeshima Tadanao (1613–1635) later married Nabeshima Naozumi of Hasunoike Domain daughter married Okubo Tadamoto (1604–1670) of Karatsu Domain daughter married Kyogoku Takatomo (1623–1674) of Mineyama Domain daughter married Shijo Takasube (1611–1647) daughter married Sakakibara Kiyoteru daughter married Osawa Naochika (1624–1681) |
| | Matehime | Yojuin | 1589 | May 5, 1638 | Matsudaira Yasumoto (1552–1603) of Sekiyado Domain | First: Fukushima Masayuki (1858–1608); Second: Tsugaru Nobuhira of Hirosaki Domain | By First: Daidōji Naohide II (1606–1636); By Second: Tsugaru Nobufusa (1620–1662) of Kuroishi Domain |
| | Ei-hime | Dairyō-in | 1585 | March 1, 1635 | Hoshina Masanao; Takehime (1553–1618; ieyasu's half-sister) | Kuroda Nagamasa of Fukuoka Domain | Kuroda Tadayuki (1602–1654) of Fukuoka Domain; Tokuko married Sakakibara Tadatsugu (1605–1665) of Himeji Domain; Kuroda Nagaoki (1610–1665) of Akizuki Domain; Kuroda Takamasa (1612–1639) of Torenji Domain; Kameko married Ikeda Teruoki (1611–1647) of Ako Domain |
| | Kumahime | Kōshō-in | 1595 | April 12, 1632 | Hisamatsu Sadakatsu of Kuwana Domain; Tatsu (Okudaira Sadatomo {d. 1585}’s daughter) | Yamauchi Tadayoshi (1592–1665) of Tosa Domain | Yamauchi Tadatoyo of Tosa Domain; Yamauchi Tadanao of Tosa-Nakamura Domain; Kiyohime married Matsushita Nagatsuna (1610–1658) of Miharu Domain |
| | Kunihime | Eijuin | 1595 | April 10, 1649 | Honda Tadamasa of Himeji Domain; Kumahime (1577–1626; Matsudaira Nobuyasu's daughter) | First: Hori Tadatoshi (1596–1622) of Takada Domain; Second: Arima Naozumi of Nobeaka Domain | by Second: Arima Yasuzumi (1613–1692) of Nobeaka Domain; Arima Zumimasa daughter married Honda Masakatsu (1614–1671) of Koriyama Domain; Daughter adopted by Honda Masakatsu daughter married Akimoto Tomitomo (1610–1657) of Yamura Domain |
| | Kamehime | Enshō-in | 1597 | November 29, 1643 | Honda Tadamasa of Himeji Domain; Kumahime (1577–1626; Matsudaira Nobuyasu's daughter) | First: Ogawara Tadanaga (1595–1615); Second: Ogasawara Tadazane of Kokura Domain | By First: Shigehime (d.1655) married Hachisuka Tadateru of Tokushima Domain; Ogasawara Nagatsugu (1615–1666) of Nakatsu Domain; By second: Ogasawara Nagayasu (1618–1667); Ichimatsuhime (b. 1627) married Kuroda Mitsuyuki (1628–1707) of Fukuoka Domain; Ogasawara Naganobu (1631–1663); Tomohime married Matsudaira Yorimoto (1629–1693) of Nukada Domain; Daughter |
| | Manhime | Kyōdaiin | 1592 | February 7, 1666 | Ogasawara Hidemasa (1569–1615) of Matsumoto Domain; Tokuhime (1576–1607; Matsudaira Nobuyasu's daughter) | Hachisuka Yoshishige of Tokushima Domain | Hachisuka Tadateru of Tokushima Domain; Mihohime (1603–1632) married Ikeda Tadakatsu (1602–1632) of Okayama Domain; Manhime (1614–1683) married Mizuno Narisada (1603–1650) |
| | Tsubakihime | Kyusho-in | | | Matsudaira Yasumoto (1552–1603) of Sekiyado Domain | First: Tanaka Tadamasa (1585–1620) of Yanagawa Domain; Second: Matsudaira Narishige (1594–1633) of Tamba-Kameyama Domain | |
| | | Jomyo-in | | | Matsudaira Yasumoto (1552–1603) of Sekiyado Domain | First: Nakamura Kazutada (1590–1609) of Yonogo Domain; Second: Mōri Hidemoto of Chofu Domain | |
| | Hanahime | | | | Matsudaira Yasuchika (1521–1683), Ebara Masahide's daughter | | Ii Naokatsu of Annaka Domain; Masako married Matsudaira Tadayoshi of Oshi Domain; Kotoko’in married Date Hidemune of Uwajima Domain |
| | | Ryuko-in | | | Matsudaira Yasumoto (1552–1603) of Sekiyado Domain | Suganuma Sadayori (1576–1605) of Nagashima Domain | |
| | Kikuhime | Kogen’in | 1588 | October 28, 1661 | Abe Nagamori (1568–1632) of Ogaki Domain; Matsudaira Kiyomune (1538–1605) of Hachiman'yama Domain's daughter | Nabeshima Katsushige of Saga Domain | Ichihime married Uesugi Sadakatsu (1604–1645) of Yonezawa Domain; Tsuruhime married Takeu Shigetoki (1608–1669); Mitsuchiyo; Nabeshima Tadanao (1613–1635); Nabeshima Naozumi of Hasunoike Domain; Hojoin married Isahaya Shigetoshi (1608–1652) Nabeshima Naohiro (1618–1661) of Shiroishi-Nabeshima clan daughter married Kakomi Tsunatoshi; Nabeshima Naotomo (1622–1709) of Kashima Domain; Priest Kyōkō daughter married Nabeshima Naohiro; Kakomi Naonaga |
| | Kanahime | Shōjō-in | 1582 | November 3, 1656 | Mizuno Tadashige | Katō Kiyomasa of Kumamoto Domain | Yasohime (1601–1666) married Tokugawa Yorinobu of Kishu Domain |
| | Yōhime | Teishō-in | 1591 | August 10, 1664 | Hoshina Masanao; Takehime (1553–1618, Ieyasu's half-sister) | Koide Yoshihide (1587–1666) of Izushi Domain | Taitō; Daughter Married Miura Katsushige (1605–1631) of Shimōsa-Miura Domain later Yamauchi Katsutada; Koide Yoshishige (1607–1674) of Izushi Domain; Daughter; Daughter; Hoshina Masahide (1611–1678); Koide Hidemoto; Koide Hidenobu; Kogaku-in married Tachibana Tanenaga (1625–1711) of Miike Domain; Daughter Married Matsudaira Nobuyuki (1631–1686) of Koga Domain |
| | | Seigen'in | | | Hoshina Masanao; Takehime (1553–1618, Ieyasu's half-sister) | Abe Nobumori (1584–1674) of Okabe Domain | Abe Nobuyuki (1604–1683) of Okabe Domain |
| | | Shosen'in | | 1642 | Makino Yasunari (1555–1610) of Ogo Domain | Fukushima Masanori of Hiroshima Domain | daughter married Minase Kanetoshi daughter married Ono Inuoemon |
| | | | | | Matsudaira Iekiyo of Yoshida Domain | Asano Nagashige (1588–1632) of Kasama Domain | Asano Naganao of Ako Domain daughter married Asano Nagaharu (1614–1675) of Miyoshi Domain daughter married Matsudaira Tadatake |
| | | Shoshitsu'in | | | Matsudaira Yasumoto (1552–1603) of Sekiyado Domain | First: Osuga Tadamasa (1581–1607) of Yokosuka Domain; Second: Suganuma Sadayoshi (1587–1643) of Tamba-Kameyama Domain | by First: Sakakibara (Osuga) Tadatsugu (1605–1665) of Himeji Domain; By Second: Suganuma Sadaakira (1625–1647) of Tamba-Kameyama Domain daughter married Ogasawara Naganori (1624–1678) of Yoshida Domain |
| | | Dōsen-in | | | Matsudaira Yasumoto (1552–1603) of Sekiyado Domain | Okabe Nagamori (1568–1632) of Ōgaki Domain | Okabe Nobukatsu (1597–1668) of Kishiwada Domain |
| | | | | | Hisamatsu Sadakatsu of Kuwana Domain; Tatsu (Okudaira Sadatomo {d.1585}’s daughter) | Nakagawa Hisanori (1594–1653) of Oka Domain | Nakagawa Hisakiyo (1615–1681) of Oka Domain |
| | Komatsuhime | | | | | | Manhime married Koriki Tadafusa of Shimabara Domain; Masahime married Sakuma Katsumune (1589–1616); Sanada Nobumasa (1597–1658) of Matsushiro Domain; Sanada Nobushige (1599–1648) of Hashina Domain |

=== Ancestry ===
Ancestors of Tokugawa Ieyasu

8. Matsudaira Nobutada (1490–1531)
4. Matsudaira Kiyoyasu (1511–1535)
9. Iwakura-dono Masako Mitsunaka
2. Matsudaira Hirotada (1526–1549)
10. Matsudaira Masayasu (d. 1525)
5. Haruhime
1. Tokugawa Ieyasu, 1st Tokugawa Shōgun
12. Mizuno Kiyotada (d. 1509)
6. Mizuno Tadamasa (1493–1543)
3. O-dainokata (1528–1602)
14. Aoki Izumi
7. Keyōin (1492–1560)

== In popular culture ==
Ieyasu's life and accomplishments were used as a model for the Japanese statesman Lord Yoshi Toranaga, portrayed in James Clavell's historical novel Shōgun. The 1980 television miniseries adaptation of the novel, starring Toshiro Mifune as Toranaga, and the 2024 miniseries, starring Hiroyuki Sanada as Toranaga, both used Ieyasu as a key reference.

2019 Netflix documentary Age of Samurai: Battle for Japan discusses the infighting in Japan during the late 16th century, or the Sengoku period, in detail. It starts with the ascension of Oda Nobunaga to how finally Ieyasu became the Shogun of Japan in 1600.

The NHK show What Will You Do, Ieyasu? (どうする家康, Dousuru Ieyasu; What Would You Do, Ieyasu?) is a Japanese historical drama television series depicting a semi-fictional history of Tokugawa Ieyasu which starred Jun Matsumoto as Ieyasu.

Tokugawa Ieyasu appears as a leader of Japan in every Civilization game except Civilization V and Civilization VII .

The Age of Empires III: The Asian Dynasties expansion pack has a Japanese campaign which focuses on the unification of Japan and the establishment of the Tokugawa shogunate with a fictional protagonist Sakuma Kichiro serving under Tokugawa Ieyasu.

Tokugawa Ieyasu appears in episode 63 of season 2 of Dinosaur King.

Tokugawa Ieyasu appears as an NPC and playable character in Koei Tecmo's Samurai Warriors and Nobunaga's Ambition.

== See also ==
- Shitennō (Tokugawa clan)
- East Asian age reckoning
- List of Tōshō-gū
- Testament of Ieyasu
- Endoji Shopping Arcade Statues

== Bibliography ==
- 同朋大学仏教文化研究所 (2013). 教如と東西本願寺 (in Japanese). 法藏館. ISBN 9784831874566.
- 本願寺史料研究所 (2015). 増補改訂 本願寺史 第二巻 (in Japanese). 本願寺出版社.
- 山本博文監修 (2007). 江戸時代人物控1000. 小学館. p. 23. ISBN 978-4-09-626607-6.
- Boxer, C. R. (1948). Fidalgos in the Far East, 1550–1770. The Hague: Martinus Nijhoff.
- Boxer, C. R. (1951). The Christian Century in Japan: 1549–1650. University of California Press. GGKEY:BPN6N93KBJ7.
- Fujino, Tamotsu (1990). 徳川家康事典 [Tokugawa Ieyasu] (in Japanese). Shinbutsu Orai Company/新人人往来社. ISBN 9784404017192.
- Honda, Takashige (2010). 定本 徳川家康 (in Japanese). Yoshikawa Kobunkan/吉川弘文館. ISBN 978-4642080477.
- Bolitho, Harold (1974). Treasures Among Men: The Fudai Daimyo in Tokugawa Japan. New Haven: Yale University Press. ISBN 978-0-300-01655-0. OCLC 185685588.
- Hirai, Takato (1992). 福山開祖・水野勝成 [Mizuno Katsunari the founder of Fukuyama]. 新人物往来社. ISBN 4404019181.
- Hirayama, Yū (2011), 武田遺領をめぐる動乱と秀吉の野望 [Takeda's Territory and Hideyoshi's Ambitions], 戎光祥出版, ISBN 978-4-86403-035-9
- Hirayama, Yū (2015). 天正壬午の乱 [Tensho-Jingo war] (増補改訂版 ed.). 戎光祥出版. ISBN 978-4-86403-170-7.
- Kanie, Seiji (1990). 日本全史:ジャパン. クロニック Japan Chronik (in Japanese). Kodansha/講談社. ISBN 9784062039949.
- McClain, James (1991). The Cambridge History of Japan Volume 4. Cambridge: Cambridge University Press.
- McLynn, Frank (2008). The Greatest Shogun, BBC History Magazine, Vol. 9, No. 1, pp 52–53.
- あおもりの文化財 徳川家康自筆日課念仏 – 青森県庁ホームページ (in Japanese)
- Kazuhiro Marushima (丸島和洋) (2015). "北条・徳川間外交の意思伝達構造" [The structure of communication in diplomacy between the Hojo and Tokugawa]. 国文学研究資料館紀要. 11 (11). 国文学研究資料館. doi:10.24619/00001469. ISSN 1880-2249.
- Kazuhiro Marushima (丸島和洋); Shunroku Shibatsuji (柴辻俊六); Masaru Hirayama (平山優); Motoki Kuroda (黒田基樹) (2015). "Yashiro Hidemasa". 北条・徳川間外交の意思伝達構造 [Biographical Dictionary of the Takeda Clan's Retainers]. Tokyodo Publishing.
- Kusudo Yoshiaki (2009). 戦国名将・智将・梟将の至言. 学研M文庫. 学習研究社. p. 14. ISBN 978-4-05-901239-9. Archived from the original on May 20, 2024.
- Milton, Giles (2011). Samurai William: The Adventurer Who Unlocked Japan. Hachette UK. ISBN 978-1444731774.
- Mitsunari, Junji (2016). 毛利輝元 西国の儀任せ置かるの由候. ミネルヴァ日本評伝選. ミネルヴァ書房. ISBN 978-4623076895.
- Miyamoto, Yoshimi (1992). 徳川家康の秘密 (in Japanese). KKベストセラーズ. ISBN 978-4-584-30294-1.
- Murakawa, Kohei (2013). "天正・文禄・慶長期、武家叙任と豊臣姓下賜の事例". 駒沢史学. 80. 駒澤大学文学部.
- Murdoch, James; Yamagata, Isoh (1903). A History of Japan: During the Century of Early Foreign Intercourse (1542-1651). Kobe, Japan: Kobe Chronicle.
- Nakamura, Akira (2010). 図解雑学 徳川家康 (図解雑学シーリーズ) (in Japanese). Natsume Company. ISBN -978-4816332661.
- Nakayama, Yoshiaki (2015). 江戸三百藩大全 全藩藩主変遷表付. Kosaido Publishing. ISBN 978-4331802946.(in Japanese)
- Nishimoto, Keisuke (2010). Keisuke家康 (ポビラポケット文庫伝記). Papura Publications. ISBN 978-4591117385.
- Noda, Hiroko (2007). "徳川家康天下掌握過程における井伊直政の役割" [The role of Ii Naomasa in the process of Tokugawa Ieyasu taking control of the country]. 彦根城博物館研究紀要. 18. Hikone Castle Museum.
- Oishi, Yasushi (2019). 今川義元 [Imagawa Yoshimoto]. シリーズ・中世関東武士の研究 第二七巻. 戎光祥出版. ISBN 978-4-86403-325-1.
- Ōkuwa, Hitoshi (2013). 教如 東本願寺への道. 法藏館.
- Sadler, A. L. (1937). The Maker of Modern Japan.
- Shinichi, Saito (2005). 戦国時代の終焉. 中公新書 1809. 中央公論新社. ISBN 4121018095.
- Seiji Kobayashi (1994). 秀吉権力の形成 書札礼・禁制・城郭政策 [Formation of Hideyoshi's power: Calligraphy, prohibition, and castle policy] (in Japanese). 東京大学出版会. ISBN 9784130260596.
- Sansom, George (1978) [1961]. A History of Japan, 1334–1615. Stanford University Press. ISBN 0-8047-0525-9.
- Shiba, Hiroyuki (2021). 徳川家康 [Studies on the Azuchi-Toyotomi Daimyo Volume 10]. シリーズ・織豊大名の研究 第十巻. 戎光祥出版. ISBN 978-4-86403-407-4.
- Shunroku Shibatsuji (柴辻俊六) (1996). 真田昌幸 [Masayuki Sanada]. 人物叢書〉 (in Japanese). 吉川弘文館. p. 72. ISBN 464205202X.
- Tatsuo, Fujita (2018). 藤堂高虎論 -初期藩政史の研究 [Todo Takatora Theory - Research on the history of early feudal government]. 塙書房. ISBN 978-4827312966.
- Toshio G. Tsukahira (1966). Feudal Control in Tokugawa Japan. Brill. ISBN 978-1-68417-151-4.
- Turnbull, Stephen (1998). The Samurai Sourcebook. London: Cassell & Co. ISBN 9781854095237.
- Stephen Turnbull (2012). Tokugawa Ieyasu. Bloomsbury Publishing. pp. 13, 27, 34. ISBN 9781849085755.
- Stephen Turnbull (2013). The Samurai A Military History. Taylor & Francis. pp. 162–163. ISBN 9781134243693.
- Tanaka, Kaoru (2007). 松本藩. シリーズ藩物語. 現代書館. ISBN 978-4-7684-7108-1.
- Taniguchi, 克広 (2007). 信長と消した家臣たち [Nobunaga and the Vassals He Erased] (in Japanese). 新書判. ISBN 978-4-12-101907-3.
- Taniguchi Katsuhiro

信長と家康 清州同盟の実体 [Nobunaga and Ieyasu: The Reality of the Kiyosu Alliance]. Gakken Shinsho (in Japanese). Gakken Publishing. March 30, 2012. ISBN 978-4-05-405213-0.

  - Taniguchi Katsuhiro (November 2019). 信長と家康の軍事同盟－利害と戦略の二十一年 [The Military Alliance Between Nobunaga and Ieyasu: Twenty-One Years of Interests and Strategy] (in Japanese). Yoshikawa Kōbunkan. ISBN 978-4-642-07111-6.
- Toshikazu Komiyama (2002). 井伊直政家臣団の形成と徳川家中での位置 [Formation of Ii Naomasa's vassals and their position within the Tokugawa clan]. 学習院史学 (Thesis). Gakushuin University Historical Society. pp. 50～66. hdl:10959/988.
- Totman, Conrad D. (1967). Politics in the Tokugawa Bakufu, 1600–1843. Cambridge: Harvard University Press. OCLC 279623.
- Ueba, Akio (2005). 本願寺東西分派史論 -黒幕の存在 (in Japanese). 清文堂出版. ISBN 4-7924-0589-0.
- Yano Kazutada (1926). 筑後国史 : 原名・筑後将士軍談 上巻 (in Japanese). 筑後遺籍刊行会. p. 190.
- 参謀本部 編 (1978). 日本戦史第13巻 小牧役 [Japanese War History Volume 13: Komaki Role] (in Japanese). "modern digital library edit of original edition 1908"

Military offices
| Preceded by Sengoku period | Shōgun: Tokugawa Ieyasu; 1603–1605 | Succeeded by Tokugawa Hidetada |
