= Ashitaka =

Ashitaka may refer to:

- Prince Ashitaka, character from Princess Mononoke
- Mount Ashitaka, Mountain in Japan
- 6961 Ashitaka, Asteroid
- Ashitaka Park Stadium, athletic stadium in Numazu
