= Echizen =

Echizen may refer to:

- Echizen Province, an old province of Japan
- Echizen, Fukui, a city in Fukui Prefecture
- Echizen, Fukui (town), a town adjacent to said city, in Fukui Prefecture
- Nomura's jellyfish, also known as Echizen jellyfish
- Mount Echizen-dake, in Shizuoka Prefecture
