= Nagatsuka Kofun (Numazu) =

Kofun period keyhole-shaped burial mound in Shizuoka, Japan

- 長塚古墳 (Japanese)
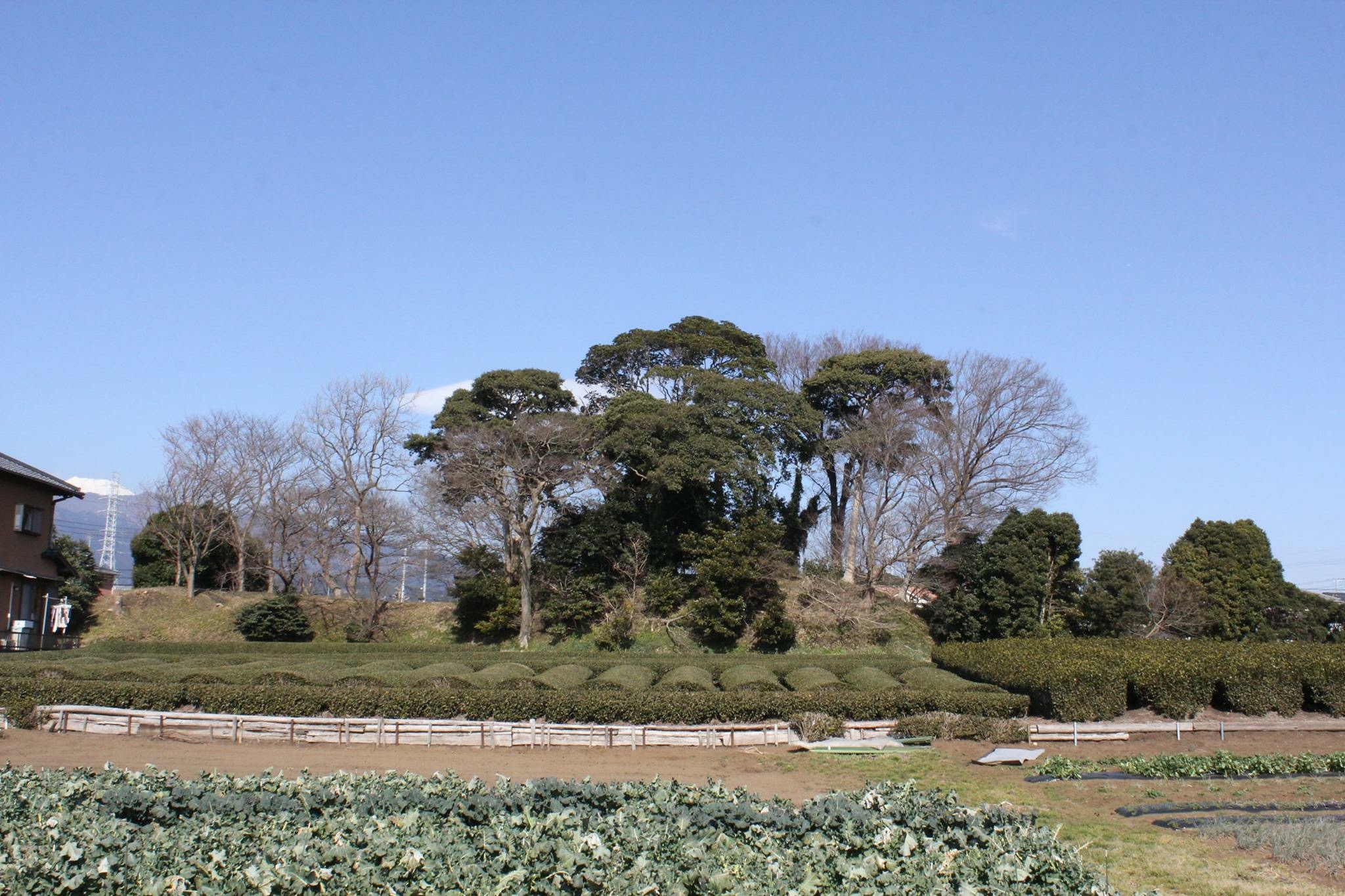
- Nagatsuka Kofun

- Nagatsuka Kofun Nagatsuka Kofun (Numazu) (Japan)
- 35°7′43″N 138°51′25″E
- Type: Kofun
- Periods: Kofun period
- Location: 403 Nagatsuka, Higashisawada, Numazu, Shizuoka, Japan
- Region: Tōkai region

History
- Built: early 6th century

Site notes
- Public access: Yes (no facilities)
- Shizuoka Prefecture Historic Site

Nagatsuka Kofun (長塚古墳) is a mid-Kofun period (early 6th century) keyhole-shaped burial mound, located in the Higashisawada-Nagatsuka neighborhood of the city of Numazu, Shizuoka in the Tōkai region of Japan. The tumulus was designated a Shizuoka Prefecture Historic Site in 1999.

== Overview ==
The Nagatsuka Kofun is a zenpō-kōen-fun (前方後円墳), which is shaped like a keyhole, having one square end and one circular end, when viewed from above. It is located at an elevation of 50 meters at the southeastern foot of Mount Ashitaka. Suruga Bay can be seen from the top of the tumulus. Several small circular enpun-style circular kofun exist around the Nagatsuka Kofun on the southern foot of Mount Ashitaka, and it is presumed that political power in the Suruga Kingdom at that time shifted along the southeastern foot of Mount Ashitaka, but from the relatively late date, it is likely that this was the tomb of kuni no miyatsuko governor who ruled Suruga Province.

It was surveyed in 1956 as part of the compilation project of the Numazu City History; however, the tumulus was located on private property, which limited archaeological excavation, and threatened its existence due to urban encroachment. The tumulus is 54 meters long, with a posterior circular section of 31 meters in diameter and 6.5 meters high, and an anterior rectangular section 16.5 meters wide and 3.6 meters high. In 1956, numerous stone slabs were discovered, suggesting the a box-shaped stone coffin once existed, but had been destroyed by grave robbers. Excavations conducted from 1997 to 1998 confirmed a moat nine to ten meters wide, but revealed that the burial chamber no longer exists. The mound had no fukiishi paving stones, but there was a row of haniwa. An iron spear, presumed to be a grave good, was unearthed from the posterior circular section. Various haniwa (cylindrical, "morning-glory shaped" and figurative) were found on the summit of the circular portion and in the moat, and Sue ware and Haji ware pottery were found in the constricted section between the mounds. The Numazu City Board of Education acquired a 1,000 square meter plot of land on the main mound area from the landowner in 2011.

Total length
54 meters (75 meters including moat)
Anterior rectangular portion
16.5 meters wide x 3.6 meters high
Width of constriction
12.5 meters
Posterior circular portion
31 meter diameter x 6.5 meters high

== See also ==
- List of Historic Sites of Japan (Shizuoka)
