= Kōriki Masanaga =

Japanese daimyō

Kōriki Masanaga (高力 正長; 1558 – June 14, 1599) was a Japanese daimyō of the Azuchi–Momoyama period, who ruled the Iwatsuki Domain. Masanaga, like his father Kiyonaga, served the Tokugawa clan.

Masanaga died in 1599, and was succeeded by his son Tadafusa.

Preceded by Kōriki Kiyonaga	Daimyō of Iwatsuki ????–1599	Succeeded by Kōriki Tadafusa
