= Kōriki clan =

Japanese samurai clan

Kōriki clan 高力
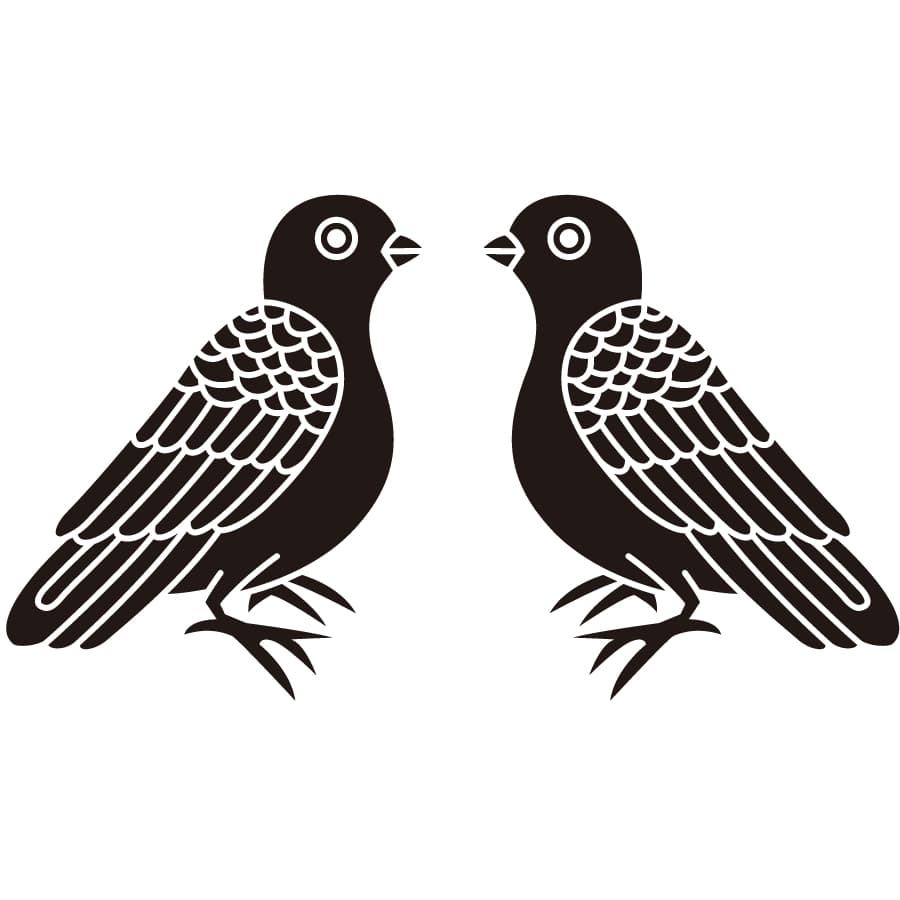
- The emblem (mon) of the Kōriki clan
- Home province: Mikawa Province
- Parent house: Kumagaya clan
- Founder: Kōriki Kiyonaga
- Final ruler: Kōriki Takanaga
- Founding year: 1590
- Ruled until: 1669

The Kōriki clan (高力氏, Kōriki-shi) was a fudai samurai clan which briefly came to prominence during the Sengoku and early Edo period Japan. Kōriki Kiyonaga (1530-1608) was a hereditary retainer of the Tokugawa clan, who served Tokugawa Ieyasu as bugyō of Sunpu and was made daimyō of Iwatsuki Domain (20,000 koku) in Musashi Province in 1590 after the Tokugawa were transferred to the Kantō region by Toyotomi Hideyoshi.

His son, Kōriki Tadafusa (1583–1655) distinguished himself in combat during the Battle of Sekigahara and the Siege of Osaka and was transferred to Hamamatsu Domain (35,000 koku) in Tōtōmi Province in 1619.

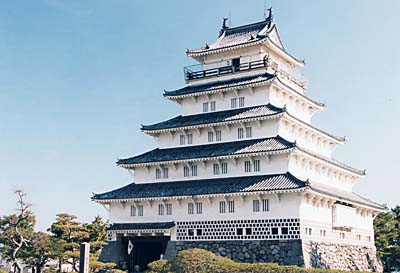
Shimabara castle

The clan was then transferred to Shimabara Domain (40,000 koku) in Hizen Province. However, his son Kōriki Takanaga (1604–1676) was dispossessed for bad administration and exiled to Sendai in Mutsu Province in 1668. The clan subsequently sunk into obscurity as a 3,000 koku hatamoto clan based initially in Dewa Province, and later in Shimōsa Province to the end of the Edo period.
