= Kōriki Tadafusa =

Japanese daimyō

Kōriki Tadafusa 高力 忠房

Personal details
- Born: 1584 Hamamatsu, Japan
- Died: January 7, 1656 (aged 71–72) Edo, Japan
- Parent: Koriki Masanaga (father)
- Relatives: Koriki Kiyonaga (grandfather)

Military service
- Allegiance: Tokugawa clan Tokugawa Shogunate
- Rank: Daimyō
- Commands: Iwatsuki Domain
- Battles/wars: Siege of Ueda; Siege of Osaka; Shimabara Rebellion

Kōriki Tadafusa (高力 忠房; 1584 – January 7, 1656) was a daimyō under the Tokugawa shogunate in early Edo period Japan.

== Biography ==
Kōriki Tadafusa was born in Hamamatsu, Tōtōmi Province, in 1584 as the eldest son of the daimyō of Iwatsuki Domain (20,000 koku) in Musashi, Kōriki Masanaga. However, as his father died when Tadafusa was still young, he was raised by his grandfather Kiyonaga. Tadafusa inherited the lordship of the Iwatsuki Domain from his grandfather in 1599, and shortly afterward, joined Tokugawa Hidetada's army for the Battle of Sekigahara, though the army did not arrive in time for the battle. In the wake of Sekigahara, Mashita Nagamori was entrusted to Tadafusa's care.

In 1609, Iwatsuki Castle was destroyed by fire. In 1614, Tadafusa was assigned to oversee the smooth transfer of Odawara Domain from the disgraced Ōkubo Tadachika to Abe Masatsugu.

Tadafusa also took part in the Siege of Osaka, and, under the leadership of Doi Toshikatsu, pursued the remnants of Toyotomi forces into Yamato Province. In 1619, he was transferred to Hamamatsu Domain (30,000 koku), which was increased in revenue to 40,000 koku by 1634.

In April 1639, in the wake of the Shimabara Rebellion, Tadafusa was reassigned by order of the shōgun Tokugawa Iemitsu to Shimabara Domain (40,000 koku) in Hizen Province. The new territory was a wasteland devastated by years of rebellion and warfare. However, Tadafusa was able to restore the area to its former productivity within a year through tax exemptions, pardons for surviving rebels, and encouraging immigration of farmers from other areas of Japan. He was also assigned the security of Nagasaki with its foreign trade port, and was an important element in the security system of the Tokugawa shogunate in a mostly tozama-held Kyūshū.

Tadafusa was married to a daughter of Sanada Nobuyuki of Ueda Domain, and was succeeded by his son Kōriki Takanaga.

| Preceded by Kōriki Kiyonaga | Daimyō of Iwatsuki; 1600–1619 | Succeeded by Aoyama Tadatoshi |
| Preceded by Matsudaira Tadayori | Daimyō of Hamamatsu; 1619–1638 | Succeeded by Matsudaira Norinaga |
| Preceded by Matsukura Katsuie | Daimyō of Shimabara; 1638–1655 | Succeeded by Kōriki Takanaga |
