= Iwatsuki Castle =

Japanese castle in Saitama Prefecture

Coordinates: 35°57′4.85″N 139°42′36.86″E

- 岩槻城
- Iwatsuki-ku, Saitama, Saitama Prefecture, Japan
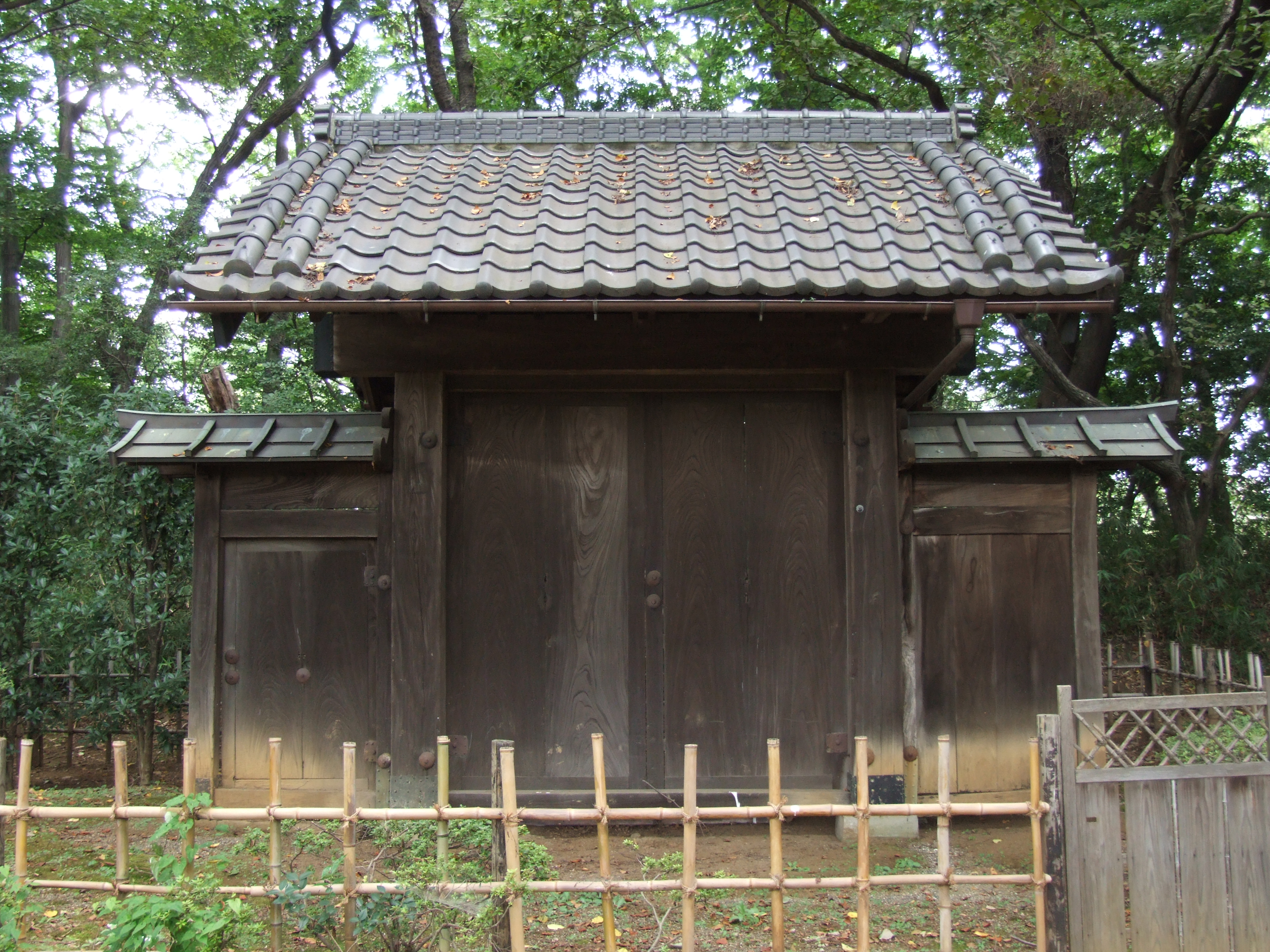
- Surviving rear gate of Iwatsuki Castle

Site information
- Type: flatland-style Japanese castle
- Open to the public: yes

Location

Site history
- Built: Muromachi period
- In use: Muromachi period to Edo period
- Demolished: 1871

Iwatsuki Castle (岩槻城, Iwatsuki-jō) is a Japanese castle located in Iwatsuki-ku, Saitama, in Saitama Prefecture, Japan. At the end of the Edo period, Tateyama Castle was home to the Ōoka clan, daimyō of Iwatsuki Domain, however the castle dates from the Muromachi period and was inhabited by many samurai lords over its history. During the Edo period, the name of the castle was written as “岩付城”. It was also known as "White Crane Castle" (白鶴城, Hakutsuru-jō) or "Floating Castle" (浮城, Uki-jō). The site of the castle is a Saitama Prefectural Historic Monument.

== Situation ==
The castle was located in the Kantō Plain near the northern border of former Musashi Province, and made use of a bend in the former location of the Arakawa River as part of its defenses to the north and east, and a swamp to the west and south. Large scale anti-flood construction diverted the main flow of the Arakawa River in the mid-Edo period, and the current location of the castle is some distance from the modern-day river. The main bailey, second enclosure and third enclosure were surrounded by very wide swampy moats, with the castle town located to the southwest.

== History ==
The castle was built in the early Muromachi period by Narita Jikosai Tosho. For a long time it was believed the castle was built by Ōta Dōkan. But new source was found and it turns out that the castle was built by Narita Jikosai Tosho.

In 1478 to protect the southern frontier of the Kantō kubō. In any event, the Ōta clan was firmly ensconced at Iwatsuki by 1522, and changed their allegiance to the increasingly powerful Odawara Hōjō following the Siege of Kawagoe Castle in 1546, which all but destroyed Uesugi power in the Kantō region. However, when Uesugi Kenshin invaded the Kantō area from the north in 1560, Ōta Sukemasa switched back his allegiance to the Uesugi. However, in 1561 Kenshin withdraw his armies, the Odawara Hōjō quickly regained their lost territories.

Ōta Sukemasa refused to submit, and in 1564 called upon the Satomi clan for assistance. However, in his absence, his son Ōta Ujitsuke betrayed him and surrendered Iwatsuki Castle to the Odawara Hōjō. Following the death of Ōta Ujitsuke in 1567, the Odawara Hōjō requisitioned Iwatsuki Castle for their own use, and rebuilt the defenses extensively with a huge system of earthen walls and deep moats enclosing an area of over a square kilometer as one of the largest and most powerful strongholds in Musashi Province. A brother of Hōjō Ujinao was made castellan, followed by his brother Ujifusa in 1585. However, in 1590 during the Battle of Odawara, Toyotomi Hideyoshi dispatched an army of 20,000 men, who quickly overwhelmed the 2000 defenders of the castle.

Iwatsuki then came under the control of Tokugawa Ieyasu, who assigned the 20,000 koku Iwatsuki Domain to one of his most trusted retainers, Kōriki Kiyonaga. Over the next 100 years, the domain came under the control of a large number of fudai daimyō clans, including the Aoyama, Abe, Itakura, Toda, Matsudaira, Ogasawara and Nagai clans before coming under the rule of the Ōoka clan, who held the domain until the Meiji restoration.

In 1775, a great fire under the time of Ōoka Tadayoshi destroyed the castle and most of the surrounding town. The central donjon of the castle again burned down in 1865 and Ōoka Tadayuki lacked the financial capacity to rebuild it. The Ōoka clan sided with the pro-imperial forces in the Boshin War.

Following the Meiji restoration, most of the castle structures were dismantled, and through land reclamation much of the former castle area is now covered by the modern city. The remaining, mostly marshy areas are now the Iwatsuki Castle Park, which contains some remnants of the earthen works and moats, as well as two of the original gates of the castle which were preserved by private owners, and relocated to their present locations. The park is a noted venue for sakura blossoms in spring.

== Literature ==
- De Lange, William (2021). An Encyclopedia of Japanese Castles. Groningen: Toyo Press. p. 600 pages. ISBN 978-94-92722-300.
- Schmorleitz, Morton S. (1974). Castles in Japan. Tokyo: Charles E. Tuttle Co. pp. 144–145. ISBN 0-8048-1102-4.
- Motoo, Hinago (1986). Japanese Castles. Tokyo: Kodansha. p. 200 pages. ISBN 0-87011-766-1.
- Mitchelhill, Jennifer (2004). Castles of the Samurai: Power and Beauty. Tokyo: Kodansha. p. 112 pages. ISBN 4-7700-2954-3.
- Turnbull, Stephen (2003). Japanese Castles 1540-1640. Osprey Publishing. p. 64 pages. ISBN 1-84176-429-9.
