= Kōkokuji Castle =

Castle ruins in Numazu, Japan

- 興国寺城
- Numazu, Shizuoka, Japan
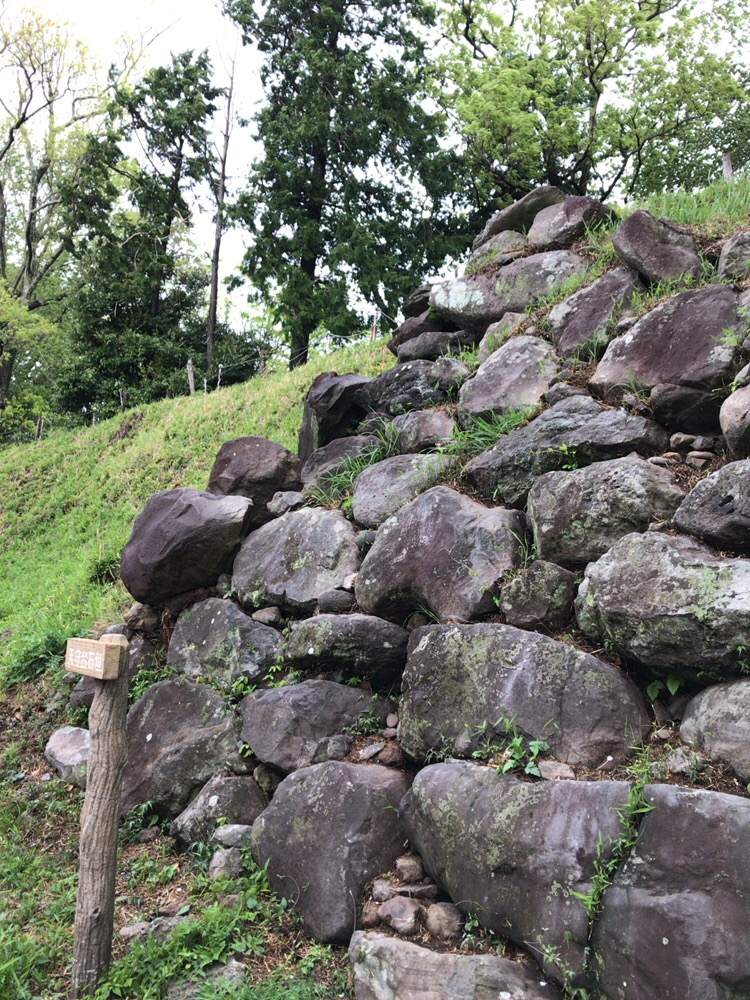
- Stone wall of Kōkokuji Castle

Site information
- Type: hirayama-style Japanese castle
- Controlled by: Imagawa clan, Later Hōjō clan, Takeda clan, Tokugawa clan
- Condition: ruins

Location
- Kōkokuji Castle
- Location within Shizuoka Prefecture Location within Japan
- Coordinates: 35°8′29.22″N 138°48′25.35″E

Site history
- Built: 15th century
- Demolished: 1607

Kōkokuji Castle (興国寺城, Kōkokuji-jō) was a Sengoku period yamashiro-style Japanese castle located in the Negoya neighborhood of the city of Numazu, Shizuoka prefecture. The ruins have been protected as a National Historic Site since 1975.

== Overview ==
Kōkukuji Castle is located on a ridge in the Ashitaka Mountains southwest of the center of modern Numazu city center. It consists of several kuruwa terraces protected by stone walls and a deep dry moat. These enclosures extend in a line from north to south, covering an area roughly 60 meters east-to-west by 50 meters north-to-south at an elevation of 36 meters. The highest part of the fortification is the Honmaru, or main enclosure, which may have held the tenshu, and to the east of the main enclosure is a stone platform which once held a cannon. The moat between the main enclosure and the neighboring kuruwa is 18 meters in depth.

== History ==
Kōkokuji Castle was originally built by the Imagawa clan to protect the eastern border of Suruga Province in the 15th century, but the exact date is unknown. The site of the castle was formerly occupied by the Buddhist temple of Kōkokuji, and the castle retained this name. Around 1487, it came under the control of Hōjō Sōun, founder of the late Hōjō clan. Hōjō Sōun's sister, Kitagawa-dono was married to Imagawa Yoshitada, and Hōjō Sōun became a retainer of the Imagawa clan. Yoshitada fell in battle in 1476 and as his son Imagawa Ujichika was still a minor, Ojika Norimitsu was appointed regent. However, Norimitsu later refused to turn over power as agreed, so Hōjō Sōun and his henchmen had him killed in order for the succession to go to his nephew Imagawa Ujichika. In return, Ujichika appointed Hōjō Sōun castellan of Kōkokuji Castle.

In 1491, Hōjō Sōun intervened in the conflict between the Ashikaga shogunate and the Ashikaga of the Horigoe Gosho and seized control of Izu Province. He then relocated to Niirayama Castle in central Izu, returning Kōkokuji Castle back to the Imagawa. The castle later changed hands between the Takeda clan and the Tokugawa clan after the fall of the Imagawa. After the Battle of Sekigahara, Tokugawa Ieyasu assigned the castle to Amano Yasukage, one of his old retainers. Amano was later disposed after an uprising in his territory and the castle was abolished in 1607.

Kōkokuji Castle is now only ruins with some stone wall, earthen walls and dry moat. The castle was listed as one of the Continued Top 100 Japanese Castles in 2017. It is located a 30-minute walk from Hara Station on the JR East Tōkaidō Main Line.

== Gallery ==
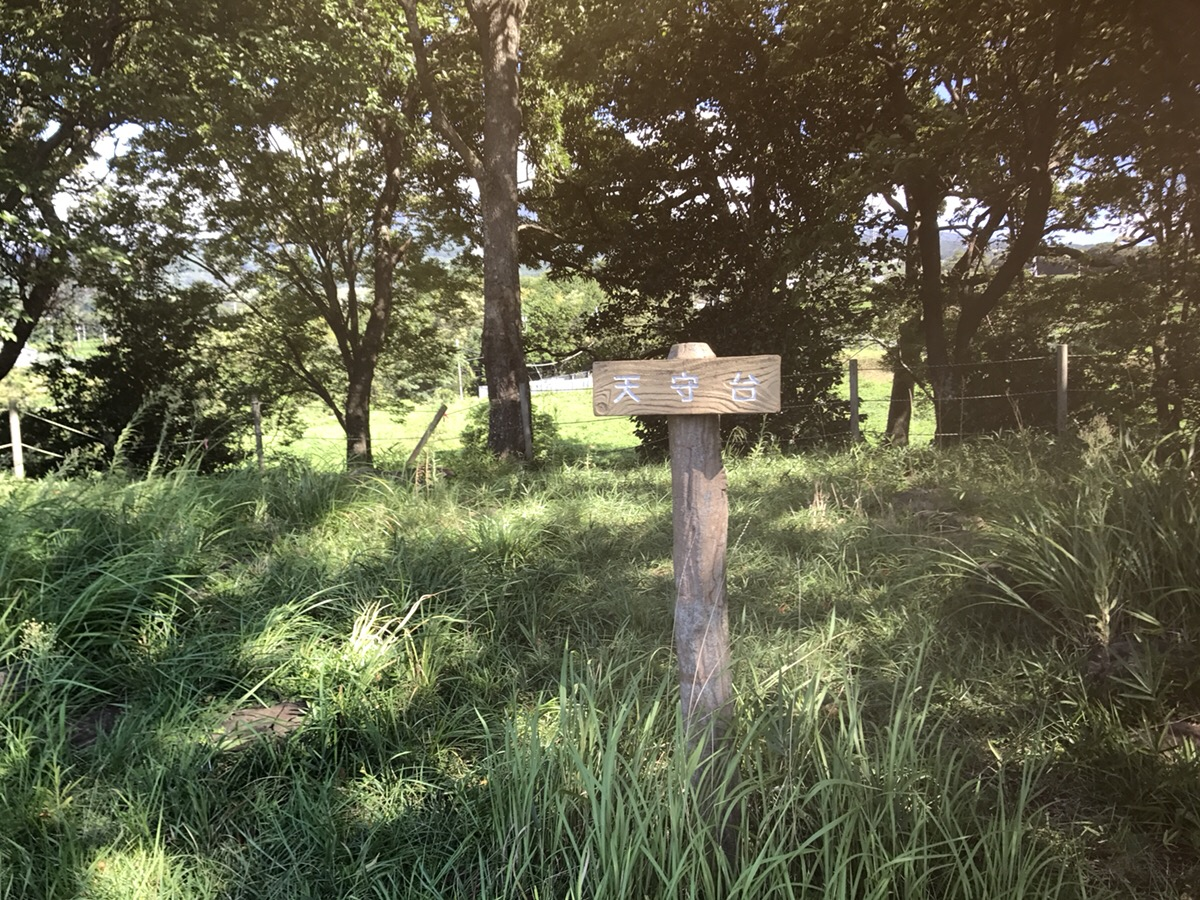
Tenshu

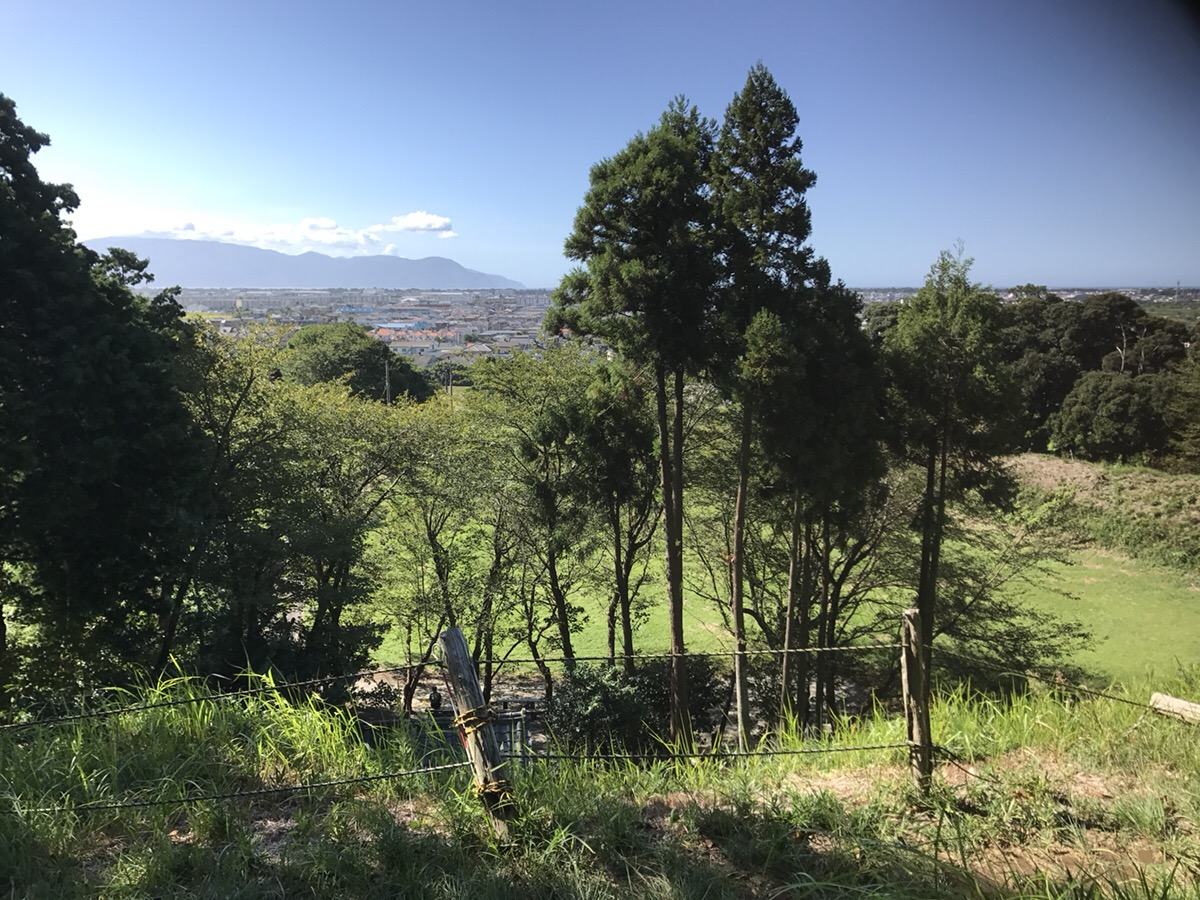
Honmaru compound from Tenshu

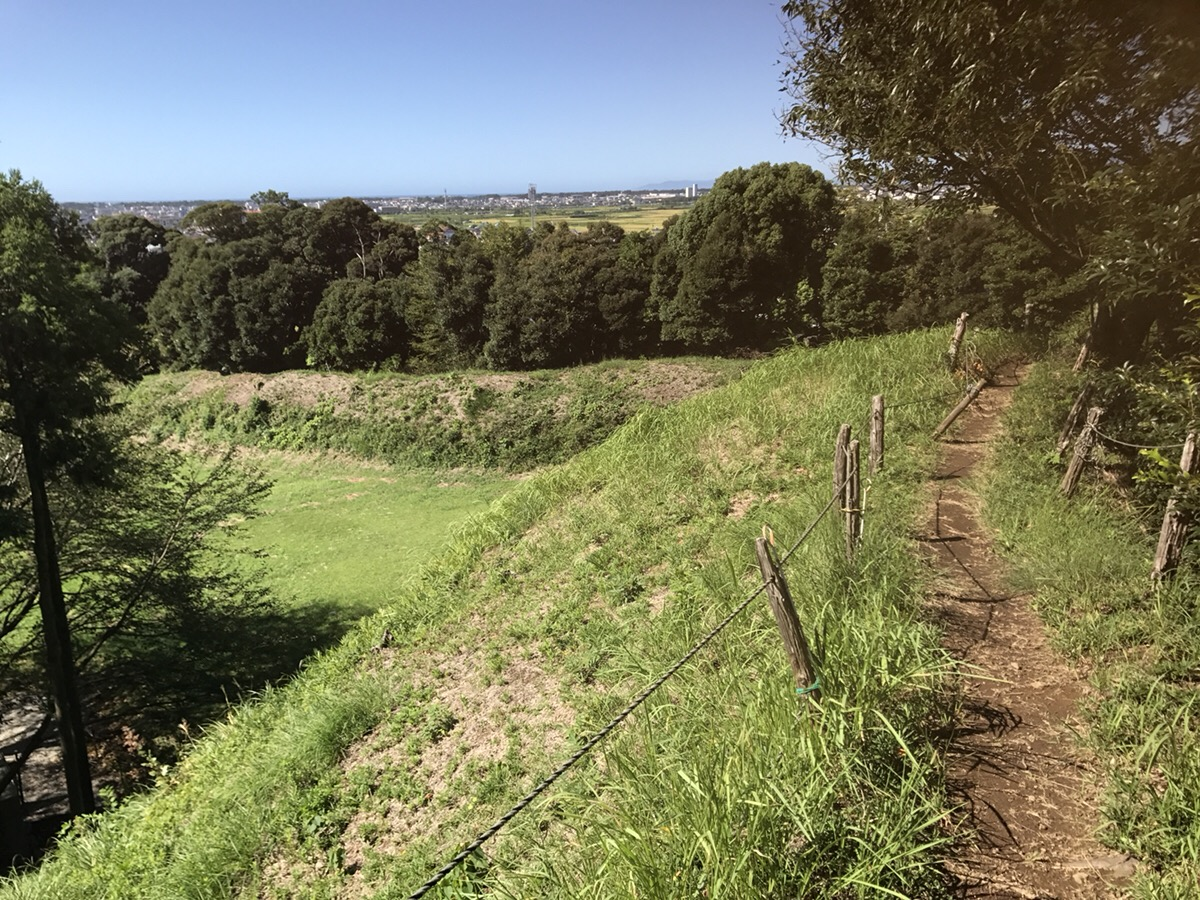
Earthen wall

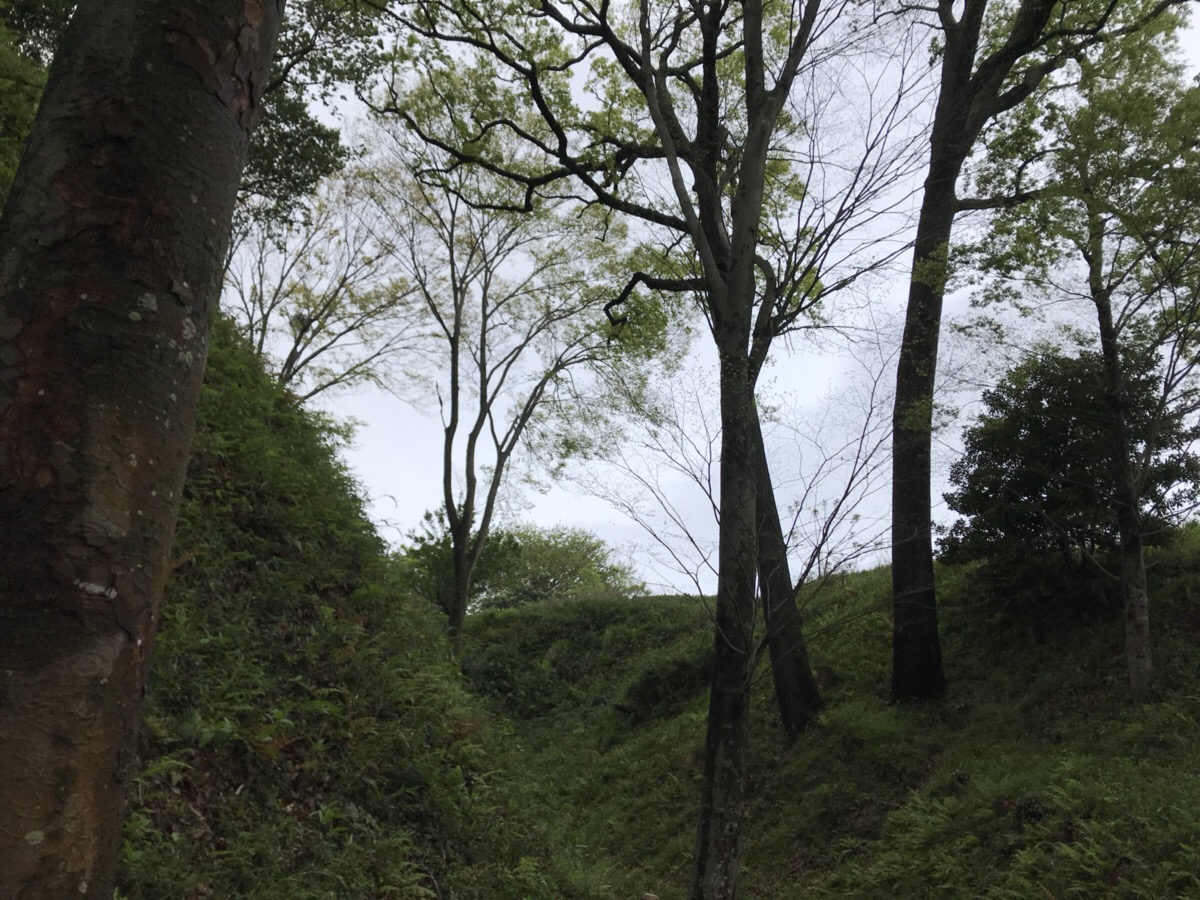
Large dry moat

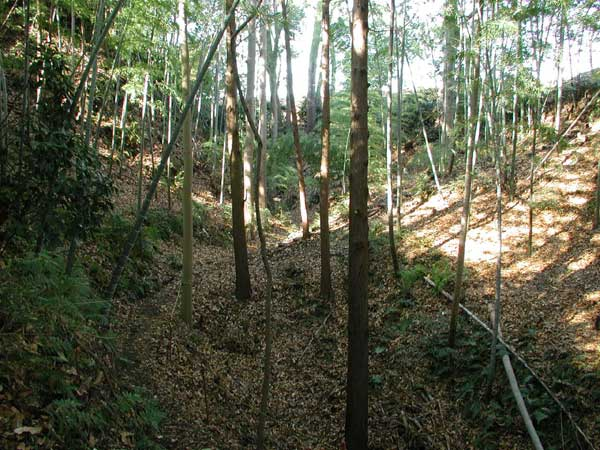
Large dry moat2

== See also ==
- List of Historic Sites of Japan (Shizuoka)
