= Iwatsuki Domain =

Iwatsuki Domain 岩槻藩
- under Tokugawa shogunate Japan
- 1590–1871
- Capital: Iwatsuki Castle
  - Type: Daimyō
- Historical era: Edo period
  - Established: 1590
  - Disestablished: 1871
- Today part of: part of Saitama Prefecture

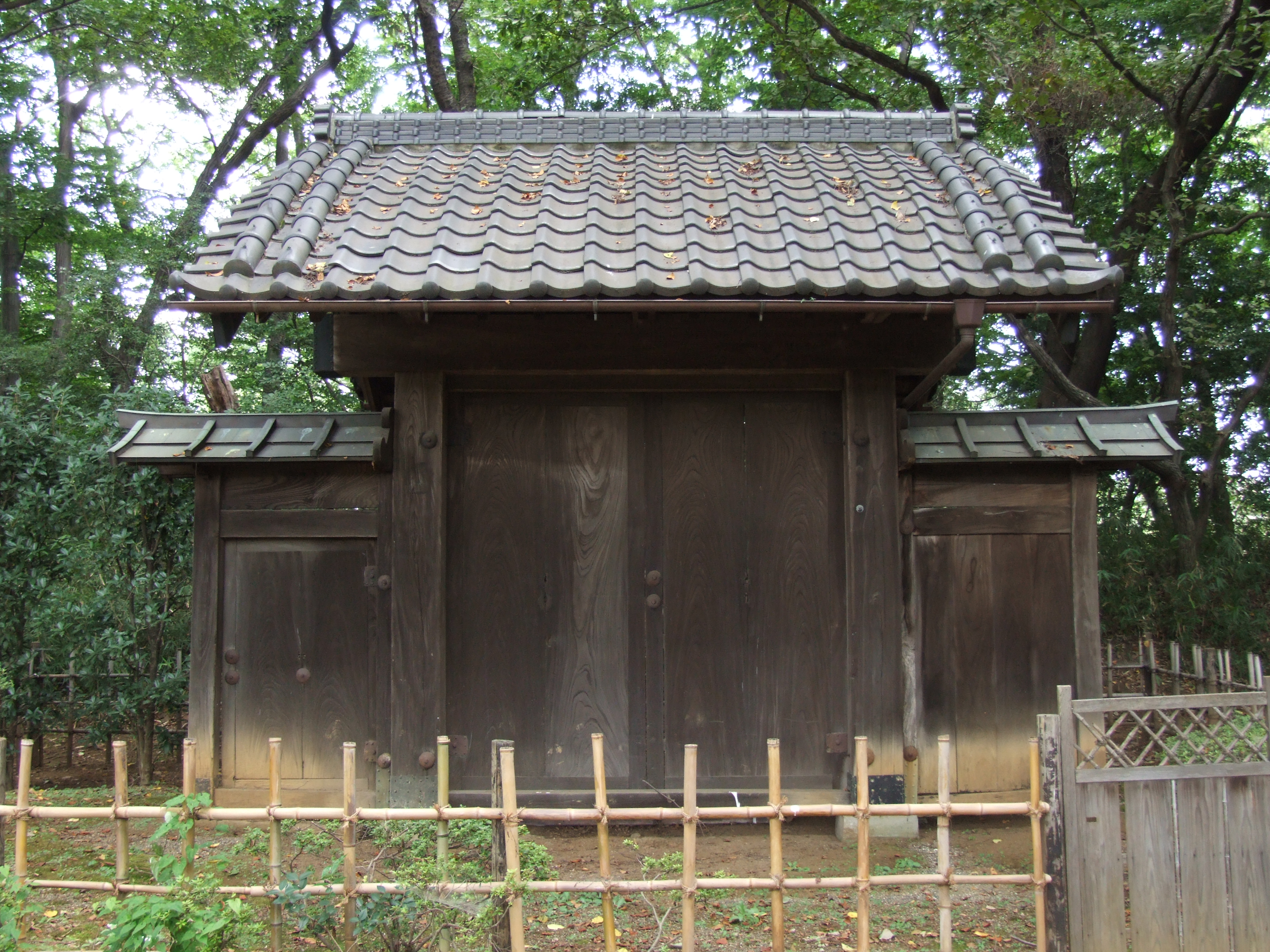
Surviving rear gate of Iwatsuki Castle, administrative center of Iwatsuki Domain

Iwatsuki Domain (岩槻藩, Iwatsuki-han) was a feudal domain under the Tokugawa shogunate of Edo period Japan, in Musashi Province (modern-day Saitama Prefecture), Japan. It was centered on Iwatsuki Castle in what is now part of Iwatsuki-ku, Saitama.

== History ==
Iwatsuki was an important strongpoint of the Odawara Hojo clan. However, following the destruction of that clan at the Battle of Odawara of 1590, the territory came under the control of Tokugawa Ieyasu, who assigned a 20,000 koku domain to one of his most trusted retainers, Kōriki Kiyonaga. Following the Siege of Osaka, his grandson Kōriki Tadafusa was awarded with a promotion to the 35,000 koku Hamamatsu Domain in 1619. The following year, in 1620, the rōjū Aoyama Tadatoshi was awarded Iwatsuki with holdings of 55,000 koku. He subsequently fell from favor and was demoted to the 20,000 koku Ōtaki Domain in 1623.

Abe Masatsugu was transferred to Iwatsuki in 1638 from Odawara Domain. The Abe clan ruled Iwatsuki over the next five generations until 1681, gradually increasing their holdings to 95,000 koku. After their transfer to Miyazu Domain, they were replaced by Itakura Shigetane (1681–1682), Toda Tadamasa (1682–1686), Matsudaira Tadachika (1696–1697) Ogasawara Nagashige (1697–1710) and his son Ogasawara Nagahiro (1710–1711).

The Nagai clan was then awarded Iwatsuki, beginning with Nagai Naohiro in 1711 and lasting for three generations until the clan was transferred to Kanō Domain in 1756.

Ōoka Tadamitsu (1709–1760), a distant relative of Ōoka Tadasuke who had started as a 300 koku hatamoto, rose rapidly through the ranks and was eventually awarded Iwatsuki and 20,000 koku in 1756. His descendants remained at Iwatsuki until the Meiji Restoration. The final daimyō of Iwatsuki, Ōoka Tadatsura (1847–1920) sided with the pro-imperial forces in the Boshin War and made a viscount (shishaku) in the kazoku peerage system in the Meiji period.

The domain had a population of 38,404 people in 6,962 households per a census in 1870.

== Holdings at the end of the Edo period ==
As with most domains in the han system, Iwatsuki Domain consisted of several discontinuous territories calculated to provide the assigned kokudaka, based on periodic cadastral surveys and projected agricultural yields.

- Musashi Province
  - 1 village in Adachi District
  - 2 villages in Katsushika District
  - 3 villages in Tama District
  - 56 villages in Saitama District
  - 1 village in Hiki District
  - 7 villages in Koma District
  - 1 village in Hara District
- Awa Province
  - 9 villages in Nagasa District
  - 1 village in Asai District
- Kazusa Province
  - 8 villages in Ichihara District
  - 1 village in Mōta District
  - 69 villages in Isumi District
  - 1 village in Nagara District
  - 4 villages in Yamabe District
- Shimōsa Province
  - 4 villages in Katsushika District
- Yamashiro Province
  - 1 village in Sōraku District
- Hitachi Province
  - 1 village in Niihari District
- Kōzuke Province
  - 5 villages in Seta District
  - 2 villages in Nawa District

== List of daimyō ==
#	Name	Tenure	Courtesy title	Court Rank	kokudaka
Kōriki clan (fudai) 1590–1619
1	Kōriki Kiyonaga (高力 清長)	1590–1600	Kawachi-no-kami (河内守)	Lower 5th (従五位下)	20,000 koku
2	Kōriki Tadafusa (高力 正長)	1600–1619	Sakon-no-taifu (左近大夫)	Lower 5th (従五位下)	20,000 koku
Aoyama clan (fudai) 1620–1623
1	Aoyama Tadatoshi (青山忠俊)	1620–1623	Hōki-no-kami (伯耆守)	Lower 5th (従五位下)	55,000 koku
Abe clan (fudai) 1623–1681
1	Abe Masatsugu (阿部正次)	1623–1638	Bitchu-no-kami (備中守)	Lower 4th (従四位下)	55,000->86.000 koku
2	Abe Shigetsugu (阿部 重次)	1638–1651	Yamashiro-no-kami (山城守)	Lower 5th (従五位下)	59,000->99,000 koku
3	Abe Sadataka (阿部 定高)	1652–1659	Bitchu-no-kami (備中守)	Lower 5th (従五位下)	99,000->115,000 koku
4	Abe Masaharu (阿部 正春)	1659–1671	Iyo-no-kami (伊予守)	Lower 5th (従五位下)	115,000->99,000 koku
5	Abe Masakuni (阿部 正邦)	1671–1681	Tsushima-no-kami (対馬守)	Lower 5th (従五位下)	99,000 koku
Itakura clan (fudai) 1681–1682
1	Itakura Shigetane (板倉 重種)	1681–1682	Naizen-no-shō (内膳正)	Lower 4th (従四位下)	60,000 koku
Toda clan (fudai) 1682–1686
1	Toda Tadamasa (戸田 忠昌)	1682–1686	Iyo-no-kami (伊予守); Jijū (侍従)	Lower 5th (従五位下)	60,000 koku
Fujii-Matsudaira clan (fudai) 1686–1697
1	Matsudaira Tadachika (松平 忠周)	1686–1697	Iga-no-kami (伊賀守) :Jijū(侍従)	Lower 4th (従四位下)	60,000 koku
Ogasawara clan (fudai) 1697–1711
1	Ogasawara Nagashige (小笠原 長重)	1697–1710	Sado-no-kami (佐渡守); Jijū (侍従)	Lower 4th (従四位下)	50,000 koku
2	Ogasawara Nagahiro (小笠原 長煕)	1710–1711	Yamashiro-no-kami (山城守)	Lower 5th (従五位下)	50,000 koku
Nagai clan (fudai) 1711–1756
1	Nagai Naohiro (永井 直敬)	1711–1711	Iga-no-kami (伊賀守)	Lower 5th (従五位下)	33,000 koku
2	Nagai Naohira (永井 尚平)	1711–1714	Iga-no-kami (伊賀守)	Lower 5th (従五位下)	33,000 koku
3	Nagai Naonobu (永井 直陳)	1714–1756	Iga-no-kami (伊賀守)	Lower 5th (従五位下)	33,000 koku
Ōoka clan (fudai) 1756–1871
1	Ōoka Tadamitsu (大岡 忠光)	1756–1760	Izumo-no-kami (出雲守)	Lower 4th (従四位下)	20,000 koku
2	Ōoka Tadayoshi (大岡 忠喜)	1760–1782	Hyōgo-no-kami (兵庫頭)	Lower 5th (従五位下)	20,000 koku
3	Ōoka Tadatoshi (大岡 忠要)	1782–1786	Shikibu-no-shō (式部少輔)	Lower 5th (従五位下)	20,000 koku
4	Ōoka Tadayasu (大岡 忠烈)	1786–1797	Tango-no-kami (丹後守)	Lower 5th (従五位下)	20,000 koku
5	Ōoka Tadamasa (大岡 忠正)	1797–1816	Shuzen-no-kami (主膳正)	Lower 5th (従五位下)	20,000 koku
6	Ōoka Tadakata (大岡 忠固)	1816–1856	Shuzen-no-kami (主膳正)	Lower 5th (従五位下)	20,000 ->22,000 koku
7	Ōoka Tadayuki (大岡 忠恕)	1816–1856	Hyōgo-no-kami (兵庫頭)	Lower 5th (従五位下)	22,000 koku
8	Ōoka Tadatsura (大岡 忠貫)	1856–1871	Shuzen-no-kami (主膳正)	Lower 5th (従五位下)	22,000 koku
