= Hotoke =

The Japanese noun hotoke (仏) is a word of Buddhist origin and uncertain etymology. It has several meanings, all but a few directly linked to Buddhism. It can refer to:

- A person who has achieved satori (state of enlightenment) and has therefore become a "buddha". (In Buddhism, the term "buddha" in the lower case refers to a person who has become enlightened (i.e., awakened to the truth).) (Note: The term is also sometimes used to represent Buddhism as a whole. For example, the expression "kami and hotoke" (神と仏) draws a distinction between Japanese kami and the enlightened beings of foreign Buddhism.)
- The historical Gautama Buddha himself
- The statue or the name of a buddha
- The laws of Buddhism
- Figuratively, the performing of a Buddhist memorial service. The Eiga Monogatari for example contains a sentence in which the term is used in that sense.
- In common parlance, a dead person; someone's soul
- Figuratively, a benevolent person or someone dear to one's heart
- Hotoke can also be a person's name or a nickname. It is for example a female character in the Heike Monogatari and daimyō Kōriki Kiyonaga's nickname.
