= Abe Masatsugu =

Japanese daimyō (1569–1647)

Abe Masatsugu 阿部正次
- Born: 1569; Mikawa Province, Japan
- Died: December 10, 1647 (aged 77–78); Osaka, Japan
- Occupation: Daimyō

Abe Masatsugu (阿部 正次; 1569 – December 10, 1647) was a daimyō in early Edo period, Japan.

Abe Masatsugu was the eldest son of Abe Masakatsu, one of the hereditary retainers of Tokugawa Ieyasu. He was born in Mikawa Province. In 1600, on his father's death, he became head of the Abe clan, and inherited his father's 5,000 koku holding in Hatogaya, Musashi Province. In 1610, he was transferred to Kanuma, Shimotsuke Province. He distinguished himself as a general during the 1614 Siege of Osaka, taking the most enemy heads of any of Ieyasu's generals. He was awarded with the rank of daimyō in 1617, and was given the 20,000 koku Ōtaki Domain in Kazusa Province. In 1619, following the disgrace of the Ōkubo clan, he was reassigned to Odawara Domain (50,000 koku) in Sagami Province. In 1623, he was reassigned, this time to Iwatsuki Domain (55,000 koku) in Mutsu Province, where his descendants remained for the next several generations.

In 1626, he was appointed Osaka-jō dai, a position which he held for the next 22 years until his death, and which raised his revenues to 86,000 koku. In 1637, he played an active role in the suppression of the Shimabara Rebellion. On April 22, 1638, he divided his holdings between his sons Abe Shigetsugu (46,000 koku) and Abe Masayoshi (10,000 koku), while retaining the remaining 30,000 koku for himself. Masatsugu died in Osaka in 1647; his grave is at the temple of Zōjō-ji at Shiba in Tokyo.

Preceded by none	Daimyō of Hatogaya; 1600–1617	Succeeded by none (domain abolished)
Preceded by Honda Masatomo	Daimyō of Ōtaki; 1617–1619	Succeeded by Aoyama Tadatoshi
Preceded by Ōkubo Tadachika	Daimyō of Odawara; 1619–1623	Succeeded by Inaba Masakatsu
Preceded by Aoyama Tadatoshi	Daimyō of Iwatsuki; 1623–1638	Succeeded by Abe Shigetsugu
Preceded by Naitō Nobumasa	Osaka Castle Warden; 1626–1647	Succeeded by Nagai Naokiyo
