= Abe Masakatsu =

Japanese samurai (1541–1600)

Abe Masakatsu (阿部 正勝; July 4, 1541 – May 19, 1600) was a Japanese samurai of the Abe clan of Mikawa who served Tokugawa Ieyasu. The son of Abe Masanobu, Masakatsu served Ieyasu from a young age, first accompanying him to Sunpu as a hostage. In 1590, Ieyasu gave him Ichihara in Izu Province, and Hatogaya, in Musashi Province, which brought Masakatsu's income to 5,000 koku. Masakatsu also received the honorary surname of Toyotomi from Toyotomi Hideyoshi in 1594. Masakatsu died at Osaka in 1600; his successor, Abe Masatsugu, received an increase in stipend, making his inherited landholding at Hatogaya a han.
