= Siege of Kaminogō Castle =

1562 siege of Japan's Sengoku period

Coordinates: 34.843°N 137.220°E

- Part of Tokugawa Ieyasu's revolt against Imagawa
Date	1562
Location	Gamagōri, Aichi, Mikawa Province
Result	Matsudaira victory

Belligerents
Matsudaira forces	Imagawa forces

Commanders and leaders
Matsudaira Motoyasu; Hattori Hanzō; Ishikawa Kazumasa	Udono Nagateru

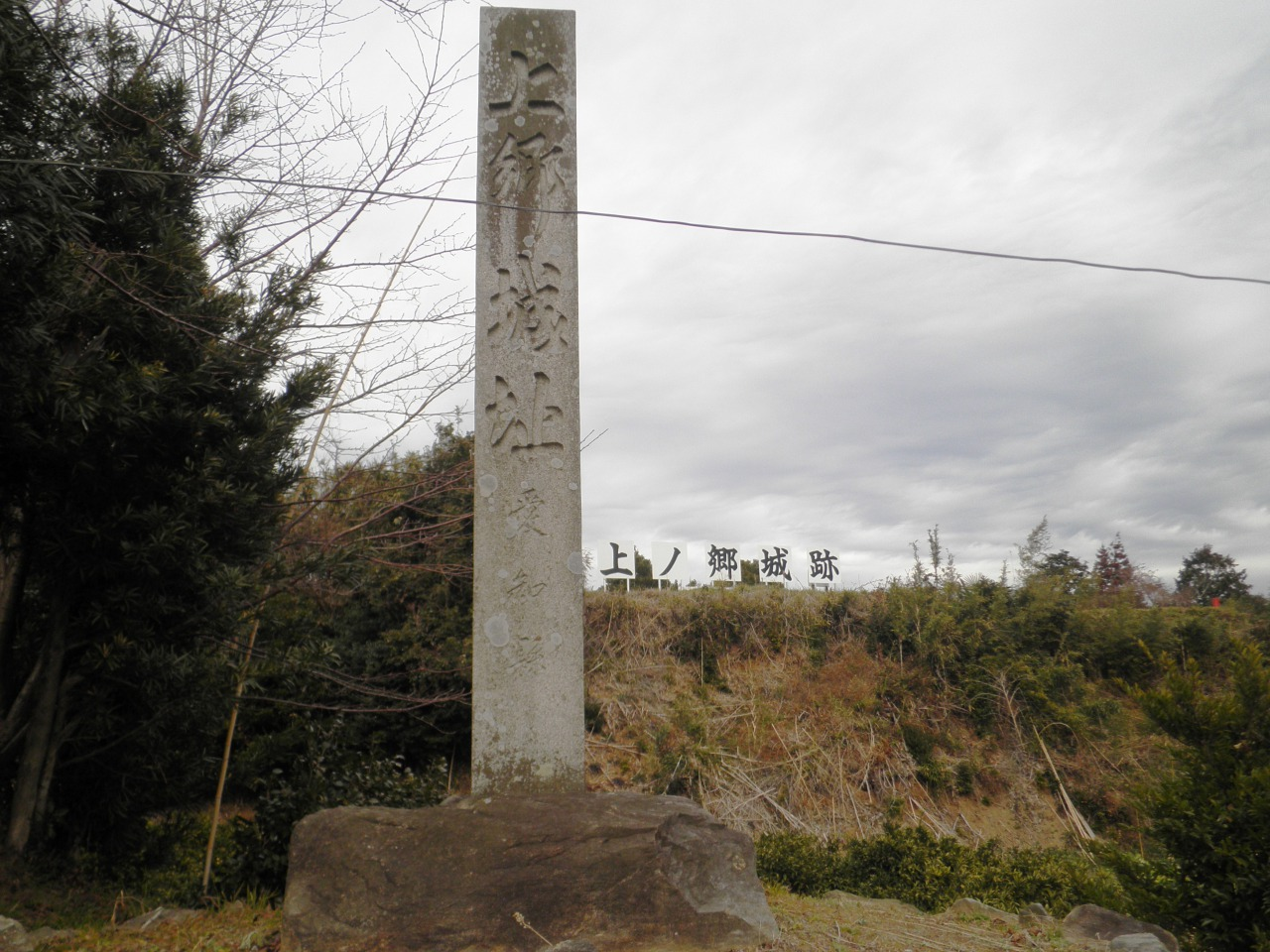
Site of Kaminogō Castle in Gamagōri, Aichi.

The siege of Kaminogō Castle was a battle in 1562, during the Sengoku period (16th century) of Japan. Kaminogō Castle was an Imagawa clan outpost located in eastern Aichi Prefecture, in what is now the town of Gamagōri.

With the help of his ninja vassal Hattori Hanzō, Matsudaira Motoyasu (later known as Tokugawa Ieyasu) laid siege to and stormed the castle. The Matsudaira force captured the castle from Udono Nagateru, a general of the Imagawa. Hanzō saves the daughters of Tokugawa Ieyasu from the Kaminogo castle with a small group of ninjas and also captures many high-ranking members of the Imagawa clan.

Motoyasu ordered Ishikawa Kazumasa as guardian of the Imagawa family, when Ieyasu managed to convince Imagawa Ujizane to release his family. Motoyasu obtained many useful hostages to use against the Imagawa, who were then in possession of his own family.
