= Ishikawa Kazumasa =

Samurai of the Sengoku era; major samurai ally of the Tokugawa clan

- 石川 数正
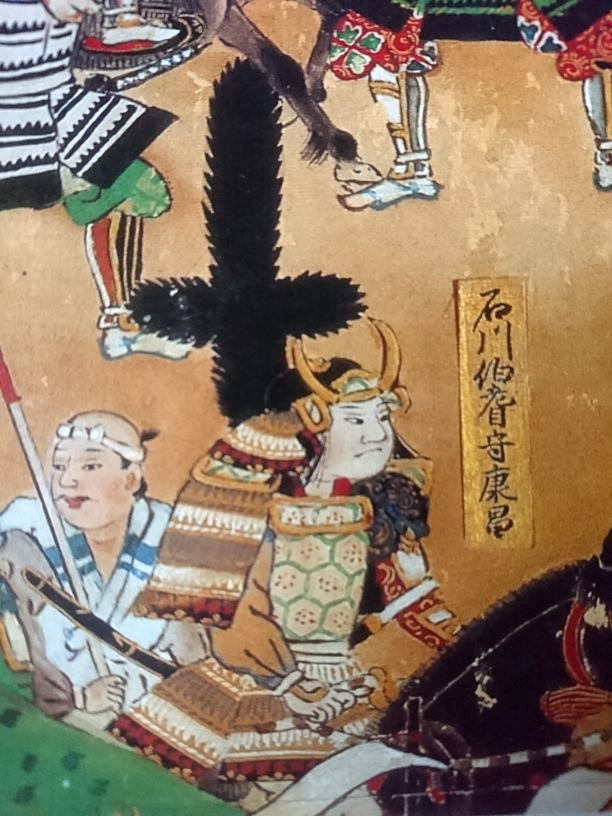

Lord of Matsumoto
- In office 1590–1592

Personal details
- Born: 1534 Mikawa Province
- Died: 1592 (aged 57–58)

Military service
- Allegiance: Matsudaira clan Imagawa clan Tokugawa clan Toyotomi clan
- Unit: Ishikawa clan
- Commands: Matsumoto Castle
- Battles/wars: Siege of Terabe (1558); Siege of Marune (1560); Siege of Kaminogo Castle (1562); Battle of Azukizaka (1564); Battle of Anegawa (1570); Battle of Mikatagahara (1573); Battle of Nagashino (1575); Battle of Komaki and Nagakute (1584)

Ishikawa Kazumasa (石川 数正; 1534–1592) was a Japanese notable retainer under Tokugawa Ieyasu, who served him since childhood, when they were both hostages under the Imagawa in 1551.

== Biography ==
Kazumasa, also accompanied Ieyasu in the Siege of Terabe 1558, and later at Siege of Marune 1560. After 1560, when Ieyasu abandoned the Imagawa, Kazumasa then became a valued retainer and administrator under him.

In 1562, he took part in the Siege of Kaminogo Castle, when Ieyasu managed to convince Imagawa Ujizane to release his family, Kazumasa acted as guardian of the Imagawa family, which at the time was a very dangerous task.

By 1567, the majority of daimyō forces in the Tokugawa armies were organized in two divisions, each with a separate commander. Kazumasa was placed over the forces of 13 Tokugawa daimyō-vassals and his counterpart, Sakai Tadatsugu, was given command over the forces of 18 daimyō-vassals.

In 1573, he participated in the Battle of Mikatagahara. and 1575 in the Battle of Nagashino.

After Toyotomi Hideyoshi's victory over Shibata Katsuie in 1583, Ieyasu expressed his congratulations to Hideyoshi through Kazumasa. Later, Kazumasa and Sakakibara Yasumasa accordingly issued statements attacking Hideyoshi, due to the Tokugawa's decision. Kazumasa served at the Komaki headquarters during the Komaki-Nagakute Campaign in 1584.

In 1585, Kazumasa, very dismayed by what he saw as Tokugawa's foolhardy path of resistance against Toyotomi Hideyoshi, later he switched sides to Hideyoshi. This inconvenienced Ieyasu, who had to reconstruct his military organization and defensive policies, since Kazumasa had significant knowledge about Tokugawa organization.

== Death ==
Upon his death in 1592 in Kyoto citing funeral rites on December 14, 1592 at the Shichijo Riverbank his eldest son Yasunaga inherited headship of the family and became the second daimyō of Matsumoto Domain, receiving 80,000 koku. The remaining portion of the original 100,000 koku was divided among his younger brothers
