= Siege of Terabe =

1558 battle in feudal Japan

Siege of Terabe Castle
- Part of the Sengoku period
Date	May–June 1558
Location	Terabe Castle 35°05′45″N 137°10′16″E
Result	Oda victory

Belligerents
Matsudaira clan forces of Imagawa Yoshimoto	Ogasawara clan forces of Oda Nobunaga

Commanders and leaders
Matsudaira Motoyasu; Sakai Tadatsugu; Ishikawa Kazumasa; Koriki Kiyonaga; Honda Shigetsugu	Suzuki Shigeteru(or Suzuki Shigetatsu)

Casualties and losses
Unknown	Unknown
- Location within Aichi Prefecture Siege of Terabe (Japan)

The siege of Terabe Castle took place in 1558 in feudal Japan. Terabe Castle was a possession of the Ogasawara clan of Mikawa Province. The Siege of Terabe Castle was Matsudaira Motoyasu's first battle, who would later change his name to Tokugawa Ieyasu.

== History ==
The castle was built on the north shore of Mikawa Bay, in what is now called Hazu, in the city of Nishio, Aichi Prefecture. In 1558, Suzuki Shigeteru(or Suzuki Shigetatsu), lord of Terabe Castle, defected from the Imagawa in favor of an alliance with Oda Nobunaga. The Imagawa responded by sending an army under the command of Matsudaira Motoyasu, a young vassal of Imagawa Yoshimoto which would later be known as the Shogun Tokugawa Ieyasu. Terabe Castle was the first of a series of battles waged against the Oda clan.

According to the records of Mikawa Monogatari written by Ōkubo Tadachika and Tokugawa Jikki chronicle, Ieyasu implemented scorched earth strategy in this battle where he stormed the castle parts of Ninomaru (officials living quarters of Japanese castles), and Sannomaru (barracks building of Japanese castles), then retreated before the enemy reinforcements from another castles came in. It was said the senior vassals of Ieyasu cried in joy during this battle as they witnessed Ieyasu personal bravery on the battlefield and comparing his feat with his grandfather, Matsudaira Kiyoyasu. Ieyasu was said fought in close combat while riding his horse.

Motoyasu's forces attacked Terabe Castle, but were driven off by reinforcements sent by Oda Nobunaga. Motoyasu then continued his campaign against other Oda clan possessions.
