= Matsudaira Tadayori =

Japanese daimyō

Matsudaira Tadayori 松平忠頼
- Born: 1582
- Died: October 26, 1609 (aged 26–27); Edo, Japan
- Occupation: Daimyō

Matsudaira Tadayori (松平忠頼; 1582 – October 26, 1609) was a Sengoku period samurai who became a daimyō under the Tokugawa shogunate in early-Edo period Japan. He was also the founder of the Sakurai-branch of the Matsudaira clan.

== Biography ==
Matsudaira Tadayori was the younger son of Matsudaira Tadayoshi, a hereditary retainer of the Tokugawa clan. During the Battle of Sekigahara, he was assigned to the defense of Okazaki Castle in Mikawa Province, and in 1601 was entrusted with Inuyama Castle in Owari Province and Kaneyama Castle in Mino Province. The same year, on the death of his uncle Matsudaira Iehiro, he inherited Musashi-Matsuyama Domain (15,000 koku), which together with the 10,000 koku in revenue from his other holdings, qualified him as a daimyō.

In 1602, Shōgun Tokugawa Ieyasu doubled his income to 50,000 koku and reassigned him to Hamamatsu Domain in Tōtōmi Province. In December 1607, he was called to assist in the rebuilding of Sunpu Castle, which had burned down.

On September 29, 1609, while in attendance during sankin-kōtai duty in Edo, he attended a tea ceremony held by Mizuno Tadatane, which was also attended by the hatamoto Kume Saheiji and Hattori Hanhachirō. After the ceremony, the participants drank sake and played go. However, and argument erupted which resulted in drawn swords, with Hattori stabbing and killing Matsudaira Tadayori. Hattori and Mizuno were both ordered to commit seppuku over the incident a month later.

Tadayori was married to a daughter of Oda Nagamasu by whom he had six sons, but the eldest Matsudaira Tadashige was still a child at the time of his death. In view of his age and the circumstances of his father's death, he was reduced to hatamoto status and Hamamatsu Domain was transferred to Kōriki Tadafusa.

Tadayori's grave is at the Inoue clan temple of Sengan-ji in Fuchū, Tokyo.

Preceded by	1st Daimyō of Hamamatsu; 1601–1609	Succeeded by Kōriki Tadafusa
