= Aoyama Tadatoshi =

Japanese daimyō

Aoyama Tadatoshi (青山 忠俊, March 18, 1578 – June 1, 1643) was a Japanese daimyō of the early Edo period.

== Biography ==
Tadatoshi was the son of Aoyama Tadanari, a Tokugawa vassal of the Sengoku period who was born in Mikawa Province. Tadatoshi, like his father, was a Tokugawa vassal, and was famous for his role as the third shōgun Iemitsu's teacher.

He became a daimyō in 1603, when Tokugawa Ieyasu granted him the domain of Edosaki.

== Notes ==
Preceded by Ashina Morishige	Daimyō of Edosaki; 1603–1620	Succeeded by Niwa Nagashige
Preceded by Kōriki Tadafusa	Daimyō of Iwatsuki; 1620–1623	Succeeded by Abe Masatsugu
Preceded by Abe Masatsugu	Daimyō of Ōtaki; 1623–1625	Succeeded by Abe Masayoshi
