= Udono Nagateru =

Japanese samurai (d. 1562)

Udono Nagateru (鵜殿 長照; ? – 1562) was a Japanese samurai of the Sengoku period, from Udono clan, who served the Imagawa clan. He was Lord of Kaminogō Castle in Mikawa Province and Imagawa Yoshimoto's nephew. In 1560 he fought at the Battle of Okehazama against Oda Nobunaga and 1562 at the Siege of Kaminogō Castle against Tokugawa Ieyasu. Nagateru would be killed by Ieyasu, with his family taken hostage to ensure the release of Ieyasu's family.
