= Battle of Azukizaka (1564) =

1564 battle in Japan

Battle of Batogahara
- Part of the Sengoku period
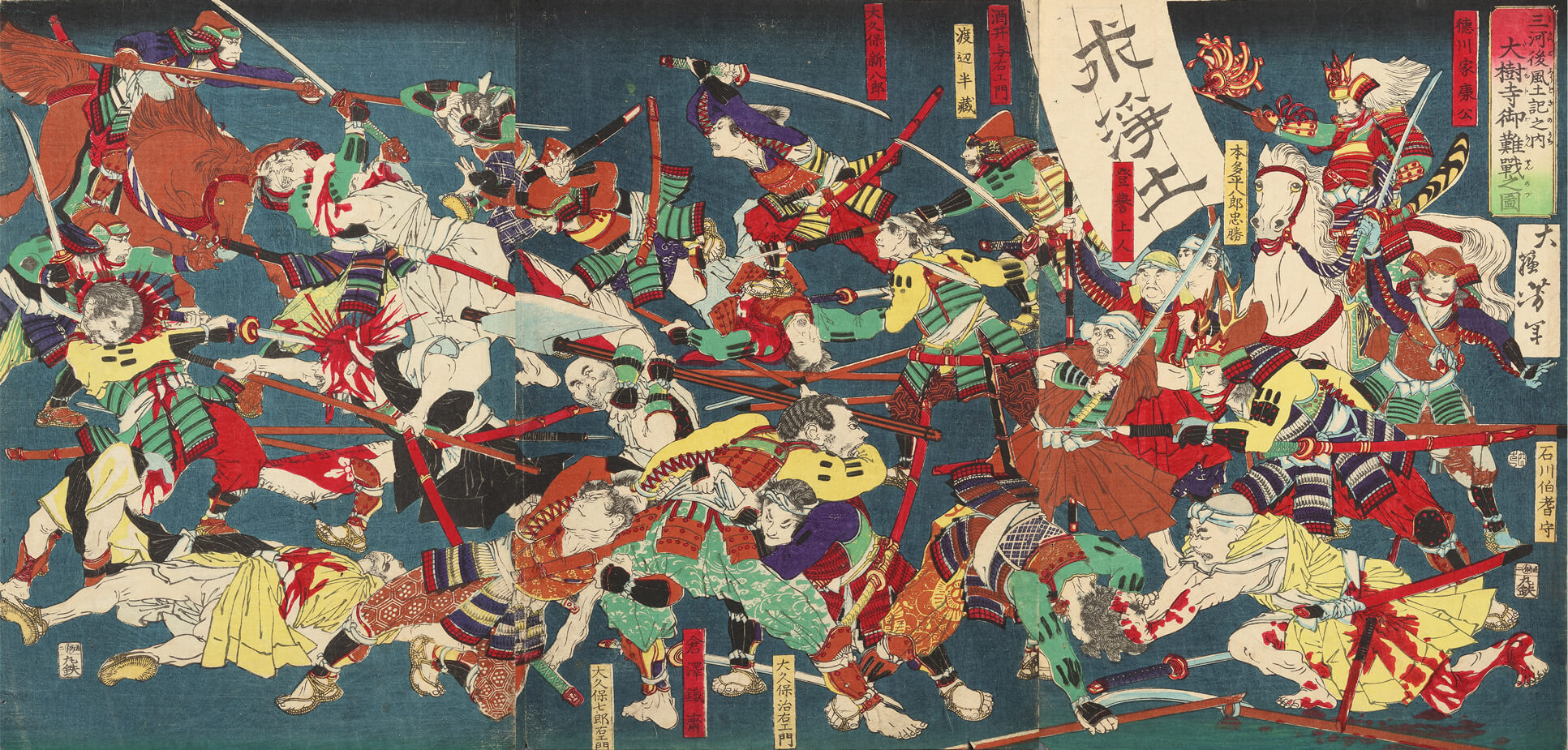
| Date | 15 February 1564 |
| Location | Okazaki, Aichi, Mikawa Province 34°55′49″N 137°10′42″E |
| Result | Matsudaira victory |

Belligerents
| Ikkō-ikki monks | Matsudaira clan and Jōdo-shū monks |

Commanders and leaders
| Kuzei; Honda Masanobu; Natsume Yoshinobu; Hachiya Sadatsugu | Matsudaira Motoyasu; Sakai Tadatsugu; Ishikawa Kazumasa; Honda Shigetsugu; Kōriki Kiyonaga; Amano Yasukage; Ōkubo Tadayo; Sakakibara Yasumasa; Honda Tadakatsu; Aoyama Tadamon |
- Location within Aichi Prefecture Battle of Azukizaka (1564) (Japan)

The Battle of Azukizaka (小豆坂の戦い, Azukizaka no tatakai) or Battle of Batō-ga-hara (馬頭原の戦い, Batō-ga-hara no tatakai) took place on 15 February 1564, when Matsudaira Motoyasu (later renamed Tokugawa Ieyasu), sought to destroy the growing threat of the Ikkō-ikki, a league of monks, samurai, and peasants who were strongly against samurai rule.

== Background ==
The Ikko-Ikki was an armed rebel movement started by followers of the Jōdo Shinshū sect which centered on Hongan-ji temple institution. In Mikawa, the sect had been spreading its teachings mainly in the middle and lower reaches of the Yahagi River since the Kamakura period. However, after Honshu-ji Temple in Toro (Okazaki City) was founded by the 8th head priest Rennyo, the influence of the Jodo Shinshu Honganji sect spread rapidly. During the Sengoku period, Honganji temples such as Honsho-ji Temple in Nodera (Anjo City), Jōgū-ji Temple in Sasaki (Okazaki City), and Shōman-ji Temple in Harizaki (Okazaki City) were known as the "Three Mikawa Temples" and boasted great power, each with over 100 of temples. According to the Mikawa Monogatari record, the cause of the uprising was said to be that Ieyasu's vassal, Sakai Masachika, entered Honsho-ji Temple on the pretext of pursuing rebels, thereby violating his privilege of not allowing shugoshifunyu (guardian envoys to stay away from the temple), although there was very little details about the incident.

The Ikko Ikki are often thought to have been organized by farmers, but there is also samurai members participated. Some of Ieyasu's vassals were known for their adherence to the Ikko Ikki, and while some, such as Ishikawa Kazumasa, Amano Yasukage, Shibata Yasutada, Honda Shigetsugu, and Honda Tadakatsu, converted to Jodo sect and sided with Ieyasu, others, such as Honda Masanobu, Honda Masashige, Watanabe Moritsuna, Hachiya Sadatsugu, and Natsume Yoshinobu, refused to convert from Jodo Shinshu and sided with the Ikko Ikki. Moreover, the Ikko Ikki also requested support from Kira Yoshiaki of Tojo Castle (Nishio City) and Arakawa Yoshihiro of Arakawa Castle (Nishio City), because Kira Yoshiaki was allied with Imagawa Ujizane and was at odds with Ieyasu, who had defected from the Imagawa clan. Tensions between the Tokugawa clan authorities of Mikawa and the Ikko followers had been escalating in Mikawa as they resisted the Tokugawa clan efforts to tax their temples. Fighting broke out in 1563 when Suganuma Sada, a Matsudaira retainer entered the Jōgū-ji temple in Okazaki and confiscated its rice to feed his own men. In retaliation the monks attacked Suganuma's castle and retrieved the rice back to Jōgū-ji where they barricaded themselves. When Motoyasu sent messengers to their temple to investigate the disorder they were executed. In another incident, Ikki samurai attacked a merchant in the temple town of Honshō-ji. Motoyasu launched a raid against the temple but was defeated.

In the next year on February, the Ikko Ikki forces also attacked Okazaki Castle, which resisted by the forces which led by Ieyasu himself, and a battle ensued at Batougahara (Azukizaka).

== Battle ==
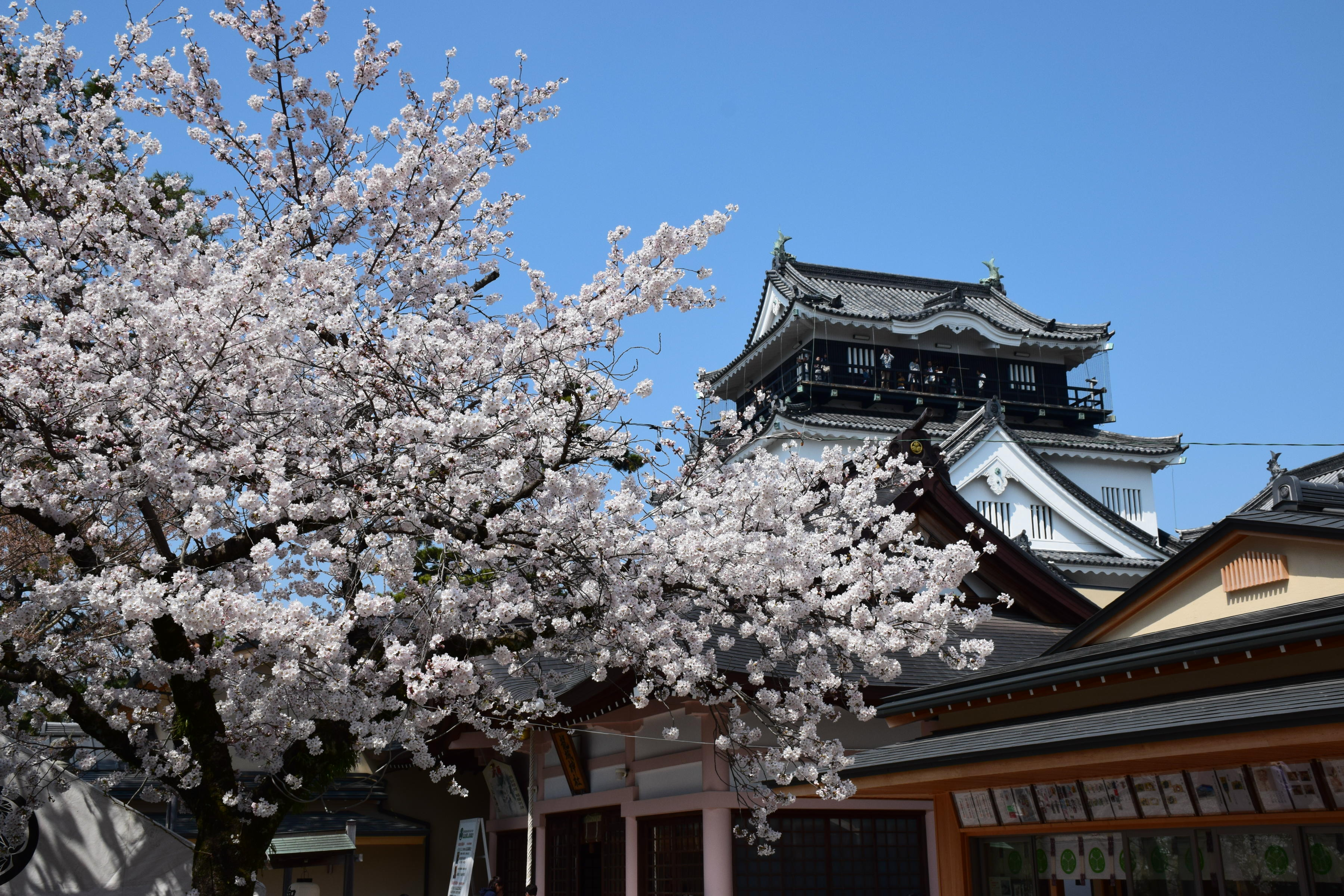
The Matsudaira residence was in the castle of Okazaki

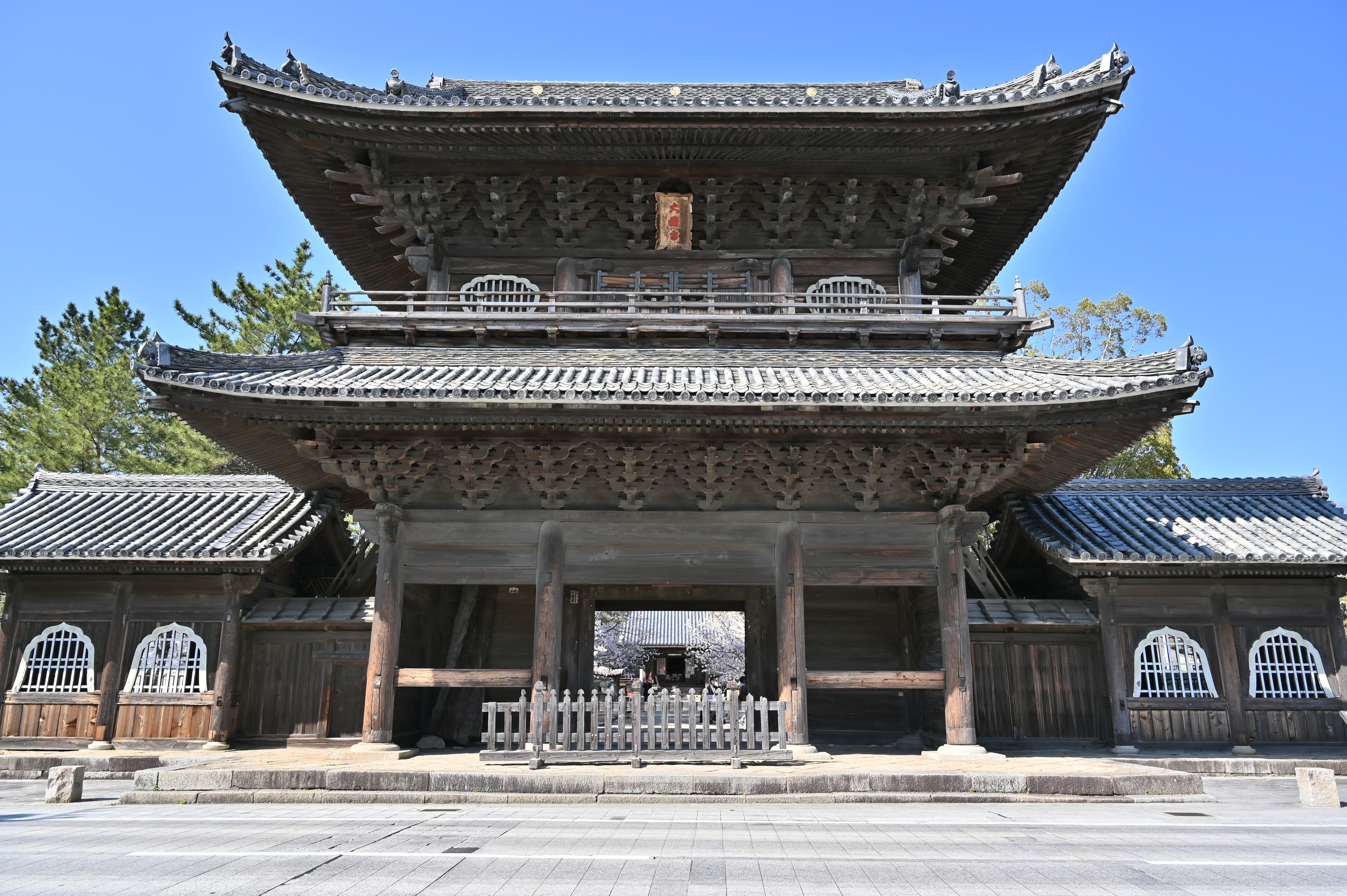
The Jōdo monastery of Daiju-ji enjoyed the patronization of the Matsudaira clan and assisted Motoyasu at Azukizaka

On 15 February 1564, Motoyasu had decided to concentrate his forces in eliminating the Ikki from Mikawa and had sought the help of warrior monks from the temple of Daiju-ji with whom he enjoyed good relations. In the Ikki ranks were some of Motoyasu's vassals, like Honda Masanobu and Natsume Yoshinobu, who had turned over to the Ikki rebellion on religious sympathy.

The battle was fierce and Motoyasu took the field personally, issuing challenges to enemy samurai and fighting in the front line where he received several bullets that pierced his armour but failed to wound him.

== Aftermath ==
Motoyasu's brave conduct in the battle convinced many of the samurai turncoats in the Ikko to switch sides and the Ikkō were defeated. Nevertheless, the battle did not spell the end of the Ikki in Mikawa, Motoyasu continued his campaign to pacify the Mikawa province from the Ikki.

Later, in April of the same year, the Ogasawara clan submitted to Ieyasu, and the Kira clan and Sakai Tadanao, who helped the Rebels, were exiled. Ieyasu issued amnesty to his vassals who had sided with him, exempting them from repayment of debts owed to his enemies, including the Honganji temples. However, after the peace agreement with the Ikko Ikki, another problem rose. Mizuno Nobumoto, who mediated the peace agreement, asked the Honshuji temples and others to accept even a portion of the amnesty, but the Hongan-ji temples opposed it, claiming that the amnesty violated the terms of the peace agreement. Cornered between the terms of the peace agreement and his promises to his vassals, Ieyasu is said to have decided to completely suppress the Hongan-ji temples in December 1564 or thereafter.

== Analysis ==
Throughout most of history, it was thought that this war of suppression was a sign of Tokugawa Ieyasu religious intolerance towards Jōdo Shinshū Buddhism which practiced and observed by Ikkō sect.

However, this view was challenged by Watanabe Daimon from Bukkyo University institute, who argues the prime motivation of this suppression were purely secular. There are two theories as for the Ikkō uprising broke out in Mikawa. The first was the violation of the privilege of non-entry (Ieyasu violated the privilege of non-entry held by Ikkō sect temples. While the second was the monopoly of economical commerce, transportations, and other authority orders by Ieyasu in that territory, which previously held by the Ikkō sect temples. Considering the second one, Daimon argues this was the most likely explanation of this war, as now Ikkō sect temples became bases of opposition against the Tokugawa clan jurisdiction. This further complicated the situation by the fact that not only Ieyasu's own vassals, but this religious uprising also brought on other Mikawa local lords such as Kira Yoshiaki and Yoshihiro Arakawa. Thus, the nature of the uprising gradually changed from religious issue into secular rebellions by many enemies of Tokugawa clan. Daimon added that it was natural if Ieyasu would respond accordingly by force. Daimon also concluded with the fact that three years later after the rebellion suppressed, Ieyasu started to allow the Ikko sect to continue to propagate, as he felt that the situation was already stable enough to allow the Ikkō temples reopened.

Historian Hamada Kōichirō stated that there is a theory that Ieyasu intentionally orchestrated the Ikkō-ikki uprising to break out, so the Tokugawa clan has Casus belli to launch military campaign in their effort to centralize control of Mikawa. This new theory was based to the fact that there are several depictions of samurai rebels retreated without fighting when Ieyasu marching out personally to the battlefield.

According to historian Masaru Hirayama the mood of rebellion against Ieyasu was all-time high during that time. The anti-Matsudaira forces involving local daimyo lords such as Sakai Tadanao and Kira Yoshiaki; and the subsequent Mikawa Ikkō Ikki uprisings, were likely caused by the military campaign started by Imagawa Ujizane to subdue Ieyasu, which gave hope for those who resisted the Matsudaira clan attempt to conquer Mikawa. During that time, Ieyasu was actually in dangerous position of being surrounded by the rebellious clans, the Ikkō Ikki and Ujizane. However, Ujizane instead passed this opportunity by his lack of focus on fighting Ieyasu, instead collecting heavy taxes, which caused many to resent him, and making the opportunity to finish Ieyasu once and for all lose its momentum. This political blunder of Ujizane gave Ieyasu much needed time to unity Mikawa Under his own rule.

== See also ==
- Battle of Azukizaka (1542)

== Bibliography ==
- Turnbull, Stephen. (1996). Samurai warfare. CASSEL IMPRINT.
- Turnbull, Stephen. (2003). Japanese Warrior Monks AD 949-1603. Oxford: Osprey Publishing.
- Turnbull, Stephen. (2008). Samurai Armies 1467–1649. Oxford: Osprey Publishing.
- Turnbull, Stephen. (2010). Samurai Armies 1467–1649. Oxford: Osprey Publishing.
