= Amano Yasukage =

Samurai of the Sengoku era; major samurai ally of the Tokugawa clan

- 天野 康景
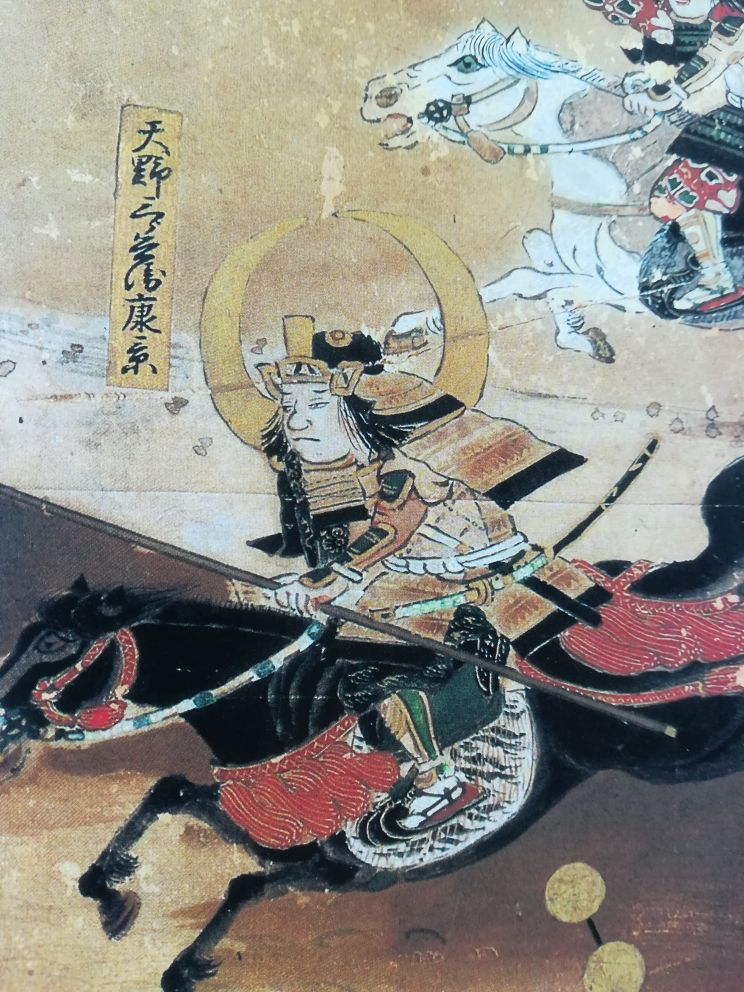

Lord of Kōkokuji
- In office 1600–1613

Personal details
- Born: 1537 Mikawa Province
- Died: April 14, 1613 (aged 75–76)

Military service
- Allegiance: Matsudaira clan Tokugawa clan Tokugawa Shogunate
- Rank: Bugyō
- Unit: Amano clan
- Commands: Kōkokuji Castle
- Battles/wars: Battle of Azukizaka (1564); Battle of Anegawa (1570); Battle of Mikatagahara (1573); Battle of Komaki and Nagakute (1584)

Amano Yasukage (天野 康景; 1537 – April 14, 1613) was a Japanese samurai of the Sengoku period and early Edo period. Who served the Tokugawa clan. He served as one of Ieyasu's "three magistrates" (san-bugyō).

== Biography ==
Yasukage was born as the son of Amano Kagetaka. Yasukage worked from a young age as a servant close to Tokugawa Ieyasu, accompanying Ieyasu even when he became a hostage.

Yasukage supported Ieyasu at Battle of Azukizaka (1564) in conflict with monks from the Ikkō-ikki religious band in Mikawa.

In 1565, he was named one of Mikawa's San-bugyô, or Three Commissioners (along with Honda Shigetsugu and Koriki Kiyonaga). Yasukage was known for his patience, Shigetsugu for his fortitude, and Kiyonaga for his leniency.

In 1573, he assisted Okubo Tadayo in a well-known night raid on the Takeda army following the Battle of Mikatagahara.

In 1586, Yasukage was assigned to lead command of the ninja from Koga Domain.

After the Battle of Sekigahara, from 1600 to 1611, he was the head of Kōkokuji Castle (10,000 koku) in Suruga Province.

Yasukage lived in seclusion at Sainenji Temple in Odawara, Sagami Province, and died there. He died on February 24, 1613, at the age of 77.
