= Ōoka clan =

Ōoka 大岡
- Ōoka clan crest
- Home province: Mikawa
- Parent house: Fujiwara clan
- Titles: daimyō, viscount
- Founder: Ōoka Tadakatsu
- Final ruler: Ōoka Tadataka
- Founding year: Kamakura period
- Dissolution: still extant
- Ruled until: 1873 (Abolition of the han system)

The Ōoka clan (大岡氏, Ōoka -shi) were a samurai kin group which rose to prominence in the Edo period. Under the Tokugawa shogunate, the Ōoka, as hereditary vassals of the Tokugawa clan, were classified as one of the fudai daimyō clans.

The Ōoka claimed descent from the Kamakura period kampaku Kujō Tadanori, settling in Ōoka Village in Yana District of northern Mikawa Province (in what is now part of the city of Shinshiro, Aichi. During the Sengoku period, Ōoka Tadato (1522–1594) was a general in the armies of Matsudaira Hirohada during the Battle of Azukizaka (1564). His son Ōoka Tadamasa (1548–1629) subsequently accompanied Tokugawa Ieyasu to the Kantō region and was given a small 220 koku holding in Kōza District of Sagami Province, which he gradually built up into 600 koku in what is now part of the city of Hiratsuka, Kanagawa. His descendants continued to assist the Tokugawa shogunate as hatamoto.

The clan’s fortunes went into eclipse when Ōoka Tadashina (1667–1710) so displeased Shōgun Tokugawa Tsunayoshi that he was exiled to Hachijojima and Ōoka Tadafusa (1650–1696) was forced to commit seppuku for killing a retainer of the Shimazu clan in a brawl.

However, the clan’s fortunes revived under Shōgun Tokugawa Yoshimune, with the appointment of the talented Ōoka Tadasuke to the position of Edo Machi-bugyō. Tadasuke performed his duties with brilliance, and was awarded with promotions within the Tokugawa bureaucracy, cumulating in the position of daimyō of Nishi-Ohira Domain (10,000 koku ) in Mikawa Province in 1748. The Ōoka remained at Nishi-Ohira until the Meiji Restoration. The final daimyō of Nishi-Ohira Domain, Ōoka Tadataka (1828–1887), was made a viscount (shishaku) in the kazoku peerage system in the Meiji period.

== Cadet lines ==
- A cadet branch was created in 1751 for Ōoka Tadamitsu (1709–1760), a distant relative of Ōoka Tadasuke. Starting as a 300 koku hatamoto, Ōoka Tadamitsu provided close assistance to Ōoka Tadasuke and rose rapidly through ranks. He was assigned Iwatsuki Domain (20,000 koku) in Musashi province, where his descendants remained until the Meiji Restoration. The final daimyō of Iwatsuki, Ōoka Tadatsura (1847–1920) sided with the pro-imperial forces in the Boshin War and made a viscount (shishaku) in the kazoku peerage system in the Meiji period.

== Notes ==
- Appert, Georges and H. Kinoshita. (1888). Ancien Japon. Tokyo: Imprimerie Kokubunsha.
- Papinot, Edmond. (1906) Dictionnaire d'histoire et de géographie du japon. Tokyo: Librarie Sansaisha...Click link for digitized 1906 Nobiliaire du japon (2003)
