= Kōriki Kiyonaga =

Japanese daimyō

- 高力 清長

Lord of Iwatsuki
- In office 1590–1600
- Succeeded by: Kōriki Tadafusa

Personal details
- Born: 1530; Mikawa Province, Japan
- Died: March 12, 1608 (aged 77–78); Edo, Japan
- Spouse: A daughter of Abe Michikane
- Nickname: "Buddha Kōriki"

Military service
- Allegiance: Matsudaira clan Imagawa clan Tokugawa clan Tokugawa Shogunate
- Rank: Bugyō
- Unit: Kōriki clan
- Commands: Iwatsuki Domain
- Battles/wars: Siege of Terabe (1558); Siege of Marune (1560); Battle of Azukizaka (1564); Siege of Kakegawa (1569); Battle of Komaki and Nagakute (1584); Siege of Odawara (1590)

Kōriki Kiyonaga (高力 清長; 1530 – March 12, 1608) was a Japanese daimyō during the Azuchi–Momoyama and Edo periods. A native of Mikawa Province, Kiyonaga served the Tokugawa clan in battle until 1600. In Mikawa, he served as one of Tokugawa Ieyasu's "Three Magistrates" (san-bugyō).

Together with Amano Yasukage and Honda Shigetsugu. Yasukage was known for his patience, Shigetsugu for his fortitude, and Kiyonaga for his leniency; this leniency earned him the nickname of "Buddha Kōriki" (Hotoke Kōriki 仏高力).

== Biography ==
Born in Mikawa, Kiyonaga first served Tokugawa Ieyasu in 1552.

In 1535, when Oda Nobuhide of Owari Province invaded Mikawa, his father Kōriki Yasunaga and grandfather Kōriki Shigenaga were both slain in battle. Kiyonaga later served Matsudaira Hirotada.

From 1552, Kiyonaga served a son of Hirotada, Tokugawa Ieyasu, and followed Ieyasu during his time as a hostage in Suruga Province.

Kiyonaga participated in various battles including Siege of Terabe in 1558 which was Ieyasu's first battle.

In 1560, Kiyonaga followed Ieyasu to the Siege of Marune. In May, participated in Imagawa Yoshimoto's invasion of Owari, as a retainer of Ieyasu where he achieved great success at the Battle of Ōdaka Castle. He also transported provisions to Ōdaka Castle during the Battle of Okehazama.

In 1562, When Ieyasu proclaimed his independence from the Imagawa clan after the death of Yoshimoto, he accompanied Ieyasu to Kiyosu Castle in Owari when he signed the Kiyosu Alliance with the Oda clan.

In 1563 Kiyonaga manage to subdue Toro Honshu-ji Temple in the eastern Mikawa during the suppression war of the Mikawa Ikkō-ikki.

In 1564, Kiyonaga also participate in the Battle of Batogahara. After this suppression campaign ended, Kiyonaga was involved in the protection of Buddhist statues and Sutra texts of the affected territories. Due to his attempts of preventing the religious scriptures dispersal and restore the temples and shrines to their original state, he was given the nickname Buddha Kōriki by the peoples of the territories where he operated.

In 1565, he was appointed as one of the three magistrates of Mikawa, together with Amano Yasukage and Honda Shigetsugu.

In 1569, he joined in the pacification of Tōtōmi Province at Siege of Kakegawa castle.

In 1584 he took part in the Battle of Komaki and Nagakute against Toyotomi Hideyoshi. After the war, he served as a messenger to Hideyoshi, and at this time Kiyonaga impressed Hideyoshi, and in 1586 he was given the surname Toyotomi.

In 1590, After Siege of Odawara (1590), Kiyonaga became a daimyō, when he was granted the 20,000 koku fief of Iwatsuki.

In 1592, Kiyonaga also assisted with ship construction for the Seven-Year War (1592-1598).

As he was preceded in death by his son Masanaga, Kiyonaga retired after the Sekigahara, and passed down family headship to his grandson Tadafusa.

Preceded by none	Daimyō of Iwatsuki; 1590–1600	Succeeded by Kōriki Tadafusa

== Appendix ==
=== Bibliography ===
- Kōhei Murakawa (村川浩平) (2000). 日本近世武家政権論 [Theory on the Samurai Government in Early Modern Japan] (in Japanese). Tokyo: 日本図書刊行会 , 近代文芸社. p. 38. ISBN 4823105281.
- Kōya Nakamura (中村孝也) (1965). 徳川家康公伝 [The Life of Tokugawa Ieyasu] (in Japanese). 東照宮社務所. p. 143.
