= Daiju-ji =

Buddhist temple in Okazaki, Aichi, Japan

- 大樹寺
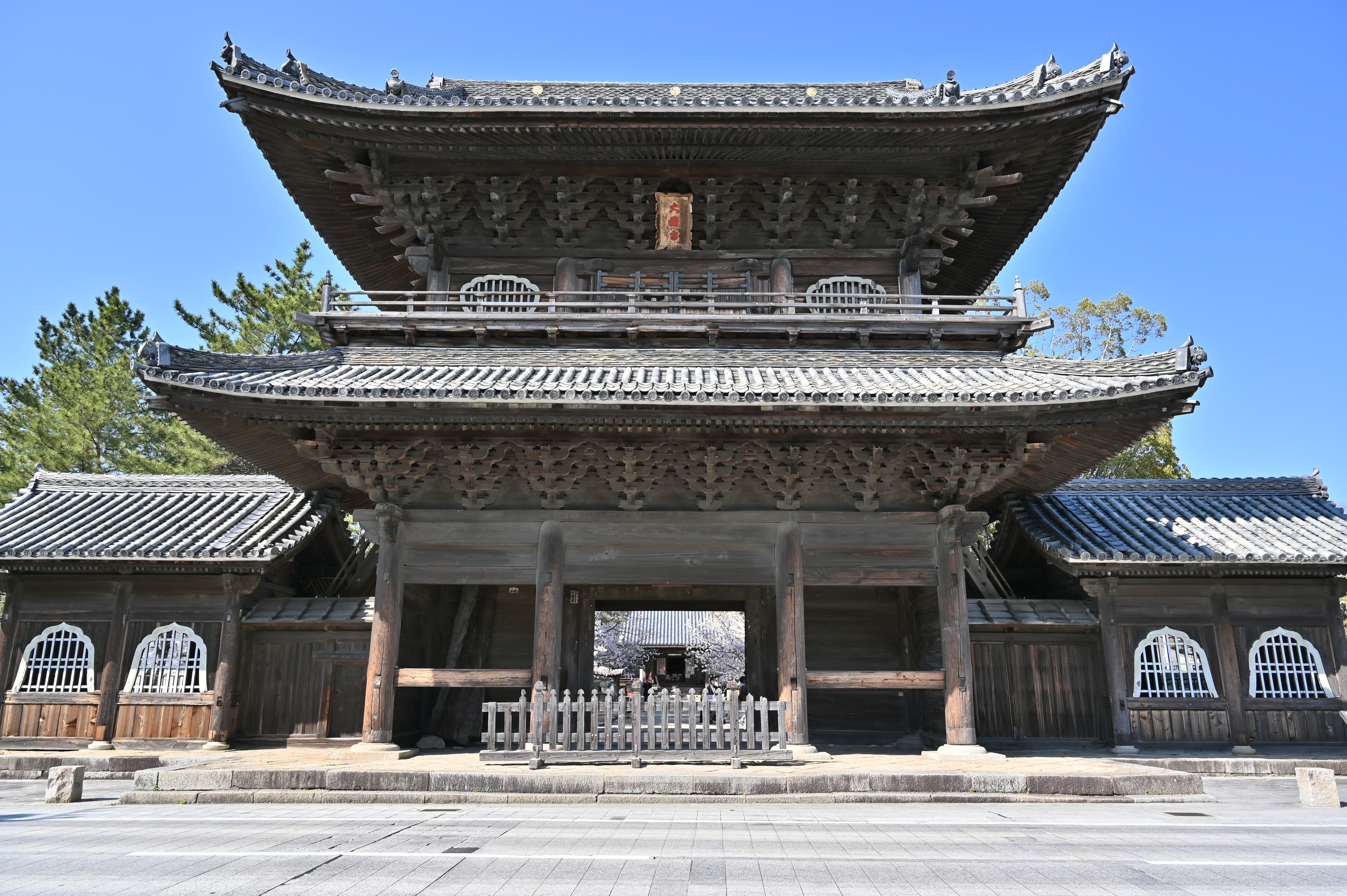
- The main gate of Daiju-ji

Religion
- Affiliation: Jōdo-shū

Location
- Location: 5-1, Aza Hiromoto, Kamoda-cho, Okazaki, Aichi
- Country: Japan
- Interactive map of Daiju-ji
- Coordinates: 34.9844°N 137.1653°E

Architecture
- Founder: Matsudaira Chikatada (松平 親忠)
- Completed: 1475

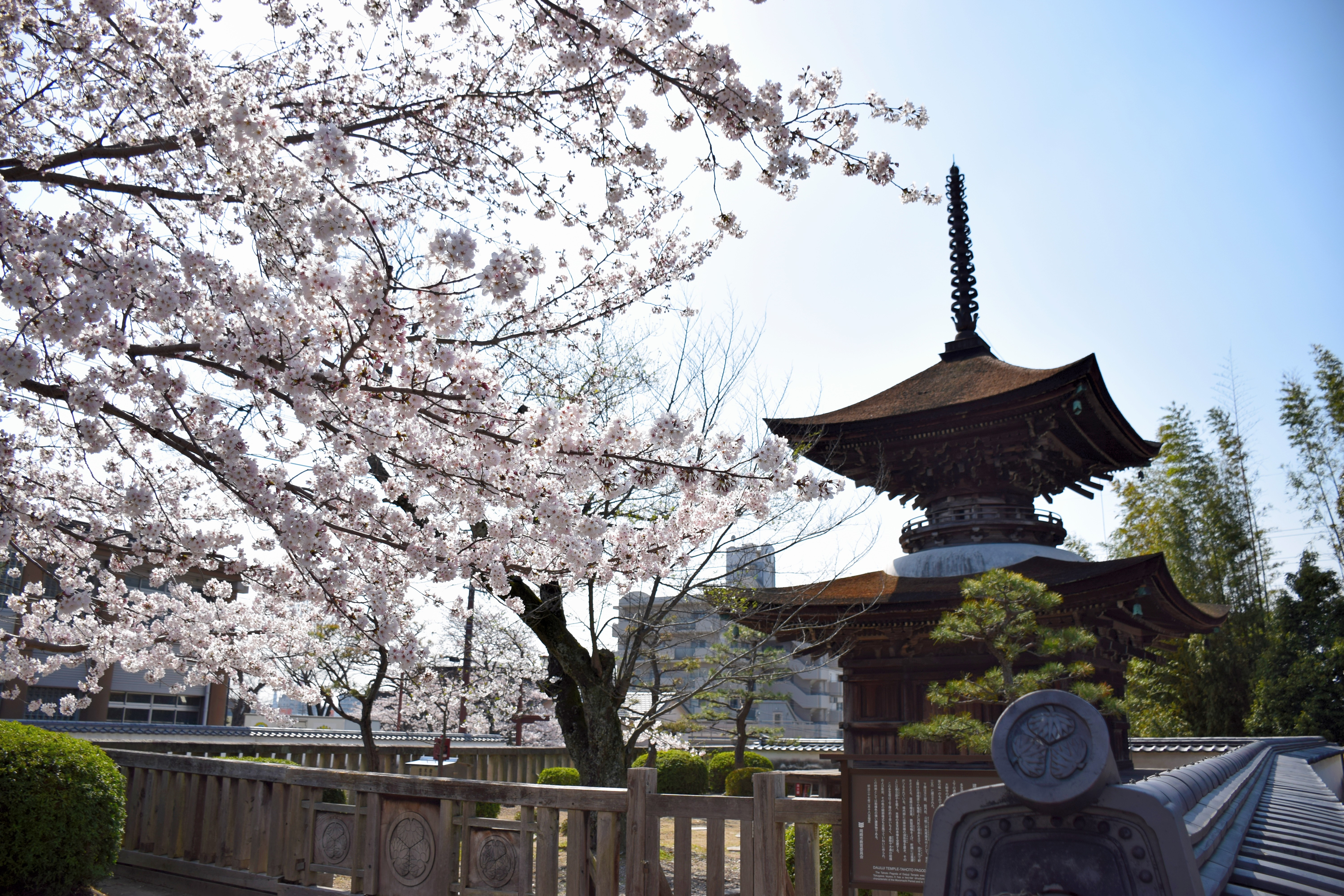

Daiju-ji (大樹寺 (だいじゅじ/だいじゅうじ)) is a Buddhist temple of the Jōdo-shū sect located in Okazaki, Aichi. Built by Matsudaira Chikatada (松平 親忠) in 1475, Daiju-ji was the family temple of the Matsudaira (松平氏) and Tokugawa clans (德川氏) which ruled Japan between 1600 and 1868. The Tahōtō of Daiju-ji, an Important Cultural Property of Japan, was built by Matsudaira Kiyoyasu (松平 清康), grandfather of Tokugawa Ieyasu (德川 家康).

After the Battle of Okehazama in 1560, in which Imagawa Yoshimoto (今川 義元) was killed by Oda Nobunaga (織田 信長), Tokugawa Ieyasu, at the time part of Imagawa's army, reportedly fled to Daiju-ji. He planned to kill himself at the temple, but while there, he was persuaded by the chief priest to declare the Matsudaira clan's independence from the Imagawa clan.
