= Mount Echizen-dake =

Volcanic peak on southeast of Mount Fuji on the island of Honshu

- Ashitaka-yama
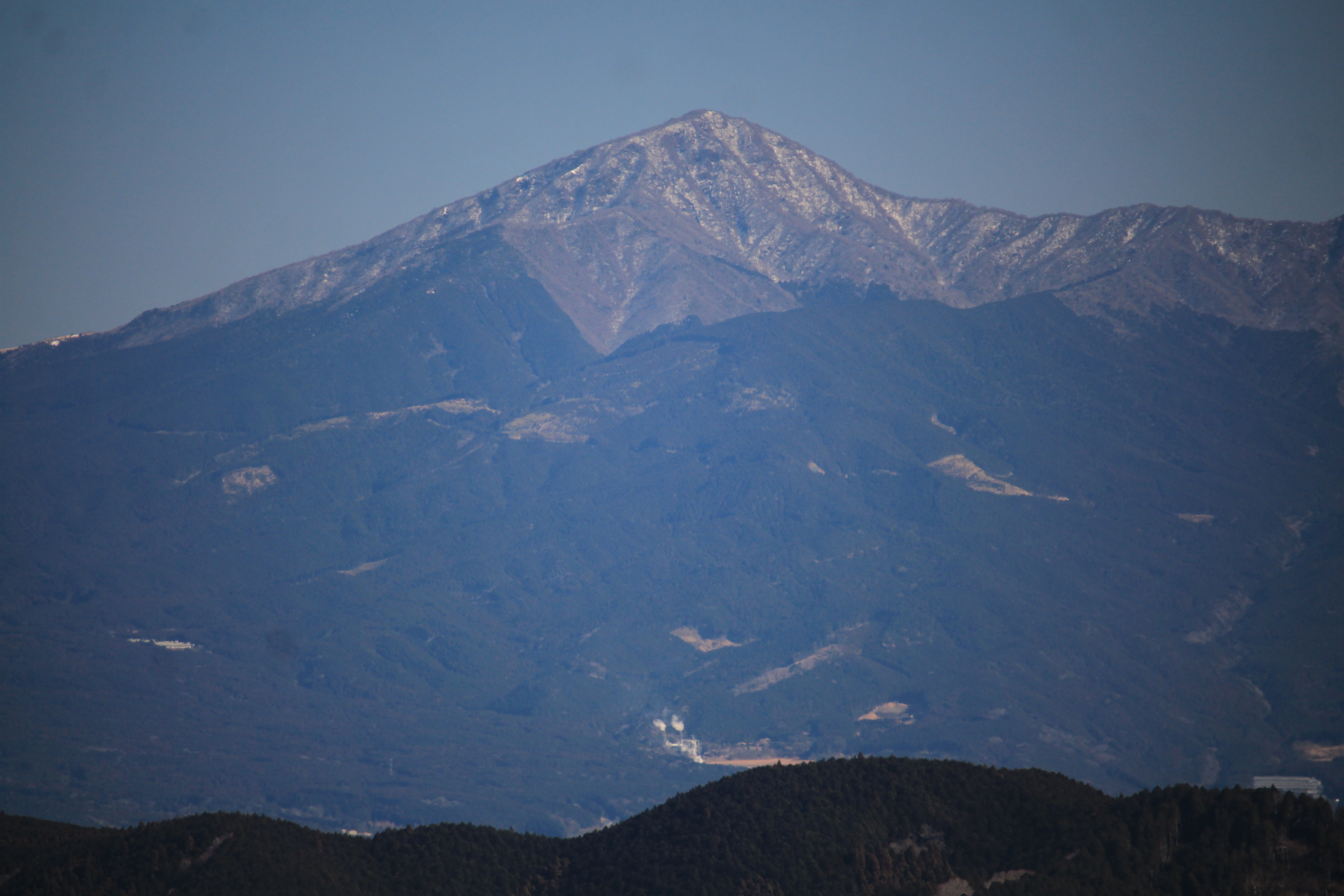
- Mount Echizen from Mount Hamaishi

Highest point
- Elevation: 1,504.22 m (4,935.1 ft)
- Coordinates: 35°14′17″N 138°47′38.5″E

Naming
- Native name: 越前岳 (Japanese)

Geography
- Location: Chūbu region, Honshu, Japan
- Parent range: Mount Ashitaka

Geology
- Last eruption: 100000 BC
- Mount Echizen-dake (Japan)

Mount Echizen-dake (越前岳, Echizendake) is a Japanese volcanic peak in the area south-east of Mount Fuji. Its summit, 1,504 meters high, is located in the Susono City, Shizuoka. It is the highest peak of the Mount Ashitaka lava dome.

== History ==
- Mount Echizen-dake erupted in the mid-Pleistocene epoch, about 100,000 years ago. It is an extinct volcano.
- Echizen-dake was depicted on the 50-yen banknote of the 1938 issue.

== Gallery ==
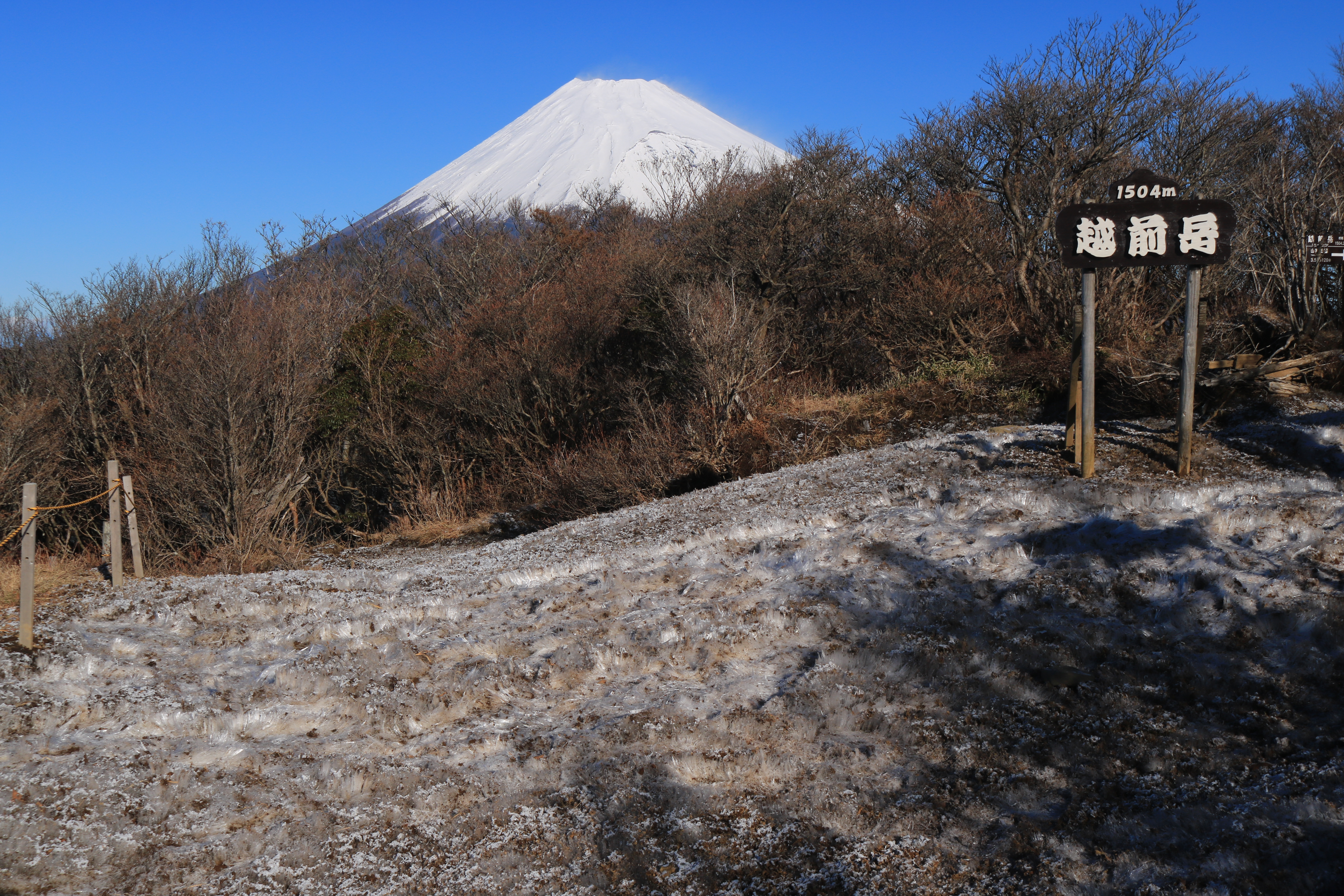
Mount Fuji from the peak

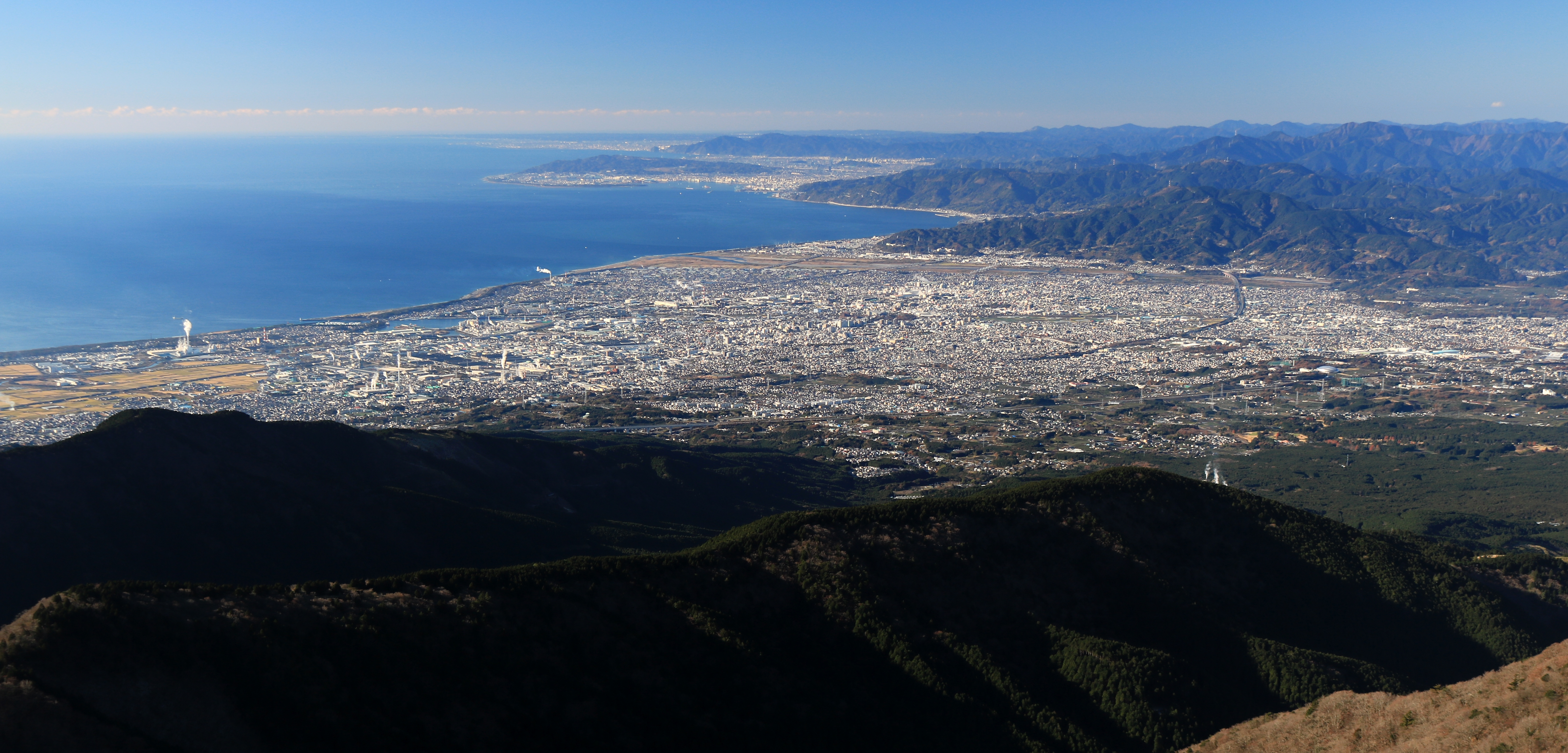
Fuji City from the peak

== See also ==
- List of volcanoes in Japan
- List of mountains in Japan
