= Hatogaya Domain =

The Hatogaya Domain (鳩ヶ谷藩, Hatogaya-han) was a Japanese domain of the Edo period, located in Musashi Province. It was centered on what is now the city of Kawaguchi in Saitama Prefecture.
