= Ōtaki Domain =

Ōtaki Domain 大多喜藩
- under Tokugawa shogunate Japan
- 1590–1871
- Capital: Ōtaki Castle
  - Type: Daimyō
- Historical era: Edo period
  - Established: 1590
  - Disestablished: 1871
- Today part of: part of Chiba Prefecture

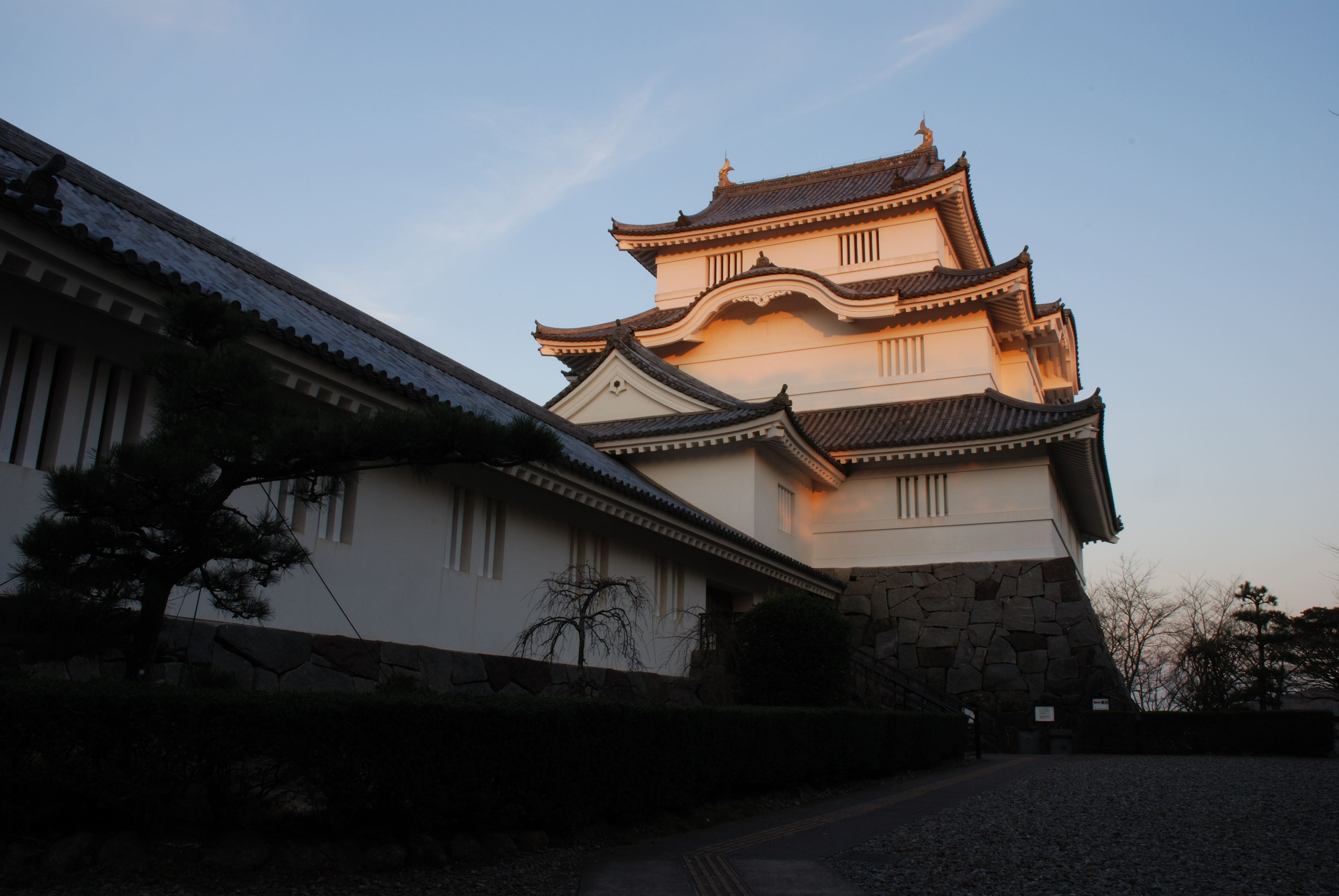
Ōtaki Castle, administrative center of Ōtaki Domain

Ōtaki Domain (大多喜藩, Ōtaki-han) was a feudal domain under the Tokugawa shogunate of the Edo period, located in Kazusa Province (modern-day Chiba Prefecture), Japan. It was centered on Ōtaki Castle in what is now the town of Ōtaki, Chiba.

== History ==
The original Ōtaki Castle was built by the Satomi clan, rulers of most of the Bōsō Peninsula during the Sengoku period. Following the Battle of Odawara in 1590, the Kantō region was assigned to Tokugawa Ieyasu by the warlord Toyotomi Hideyoshi, who also restricted the Satomi to Awa Province for their indifferent support of his campaigns against the Later Hōjō clan. Tokugawa Ieyasu appointed Honda Tadakatsu, one of his Four Generals, to be daimyō of the newly formed 100,000 koku Ōtaki Domain.

Following the Battle of Sekigahara, Honda Tadakatsu was promoted to Kuwana Domain, and Ōtaki was assigned to Honda Tadatomo, from another branch of the Honda clan, with a reduction in revenues to 50,000 koku. Honda Tadatomo died at the Battle of Tennōji and his son, Honda Masatomo was reassigned to Tatsuno Domain in Harima Province.

The Honda were replaced by the Abe Masatsugu, a hero of the Siege of Osaka, but the domain's size was further reduced to 30,000 koku. Abe Masatsugu was later transferred to Odawara Domain following the disgrace of the Ōkubo clan in the Ōkubo Nagayasu Incident of 1614, and Ōtaki Domain was suppressed in 1619.

The domain was briefly revived from 1623 to 1625 for Aoyama Tadatoshi, the tutor of the 3rd Tokugawa shōgun, Iemitsu, with its size further reduced to 20,000 koku. After his death, Ōtaki Domain reverted to tenryō territory directly under the control of the Tokugawa shogunate until 1638.

The Abe clan regained control of Ōtaki Domain in April 1638, and ruled it to 1702, when they were replaced by Inagaki Shigetomi, who ruled for only 21 days before being reassigned to Karasuyama Domain in Shimotsuke Province. The domain then came under the control of the Ōkōchi branch of the Matsudaira clan, who continued to rule Ōtaki until the Meiji Restoration. The final daimyo of Ōtaki Domain, Ōkōchi Masatada, initially fought for the pro-Tokugawa forces at the Battle of Toba–Fushimi in the Boshin War, but later changed his allegiance to the new Meiji government. He was appointed domain governor under the new administration, until the abolition of the han system in July 1871 and subsequently became a viscount under the kazoku peerage. Ōtaki Domain became "Ōtaki Prefecture", that merged with the short lived "Kisarazu Prefecture" in November 1871, which later became part of Chiba Prefecture.

The domain had a population of 21,481 people in 4,202 households per an 1869 census. The domain maintained its primary residence (kamiyashiki) in Edo at Surugadai.

== Holdings at the end of the Edo period ==
As with most domains in the han system, Ōtaki Domain consisted of several discontinuous territories calculated to provide the assigned kokudaka, based on periodic cadastral surveys and projected agricultural yields. In the case of Ōtaki Domain, the exclave it controlled in Mikawa Province as actually larger than its “home” territory in Kazusa.

- Kazusa Province
  - 21 villages in Isumi District
- Mikawa Province
  - 15 villages in Hazu District
  - 10 villages in Kamo District
- Yamato Province
  - 1 village in Toichi District

== List of daimyōs ==
#	Name	Tenure	Courtesy title	Court Rank	kokudaka
Honda clan (fudai) 1590-1617
1	Honda Tadakatsu (本多忠勝)	1590–1601	Nakatsuka-taiyu (中務大輔)	Lower 5th (従五位下)	100,000 koku
2	Honda Tadatomo (本多忠朝)	1601–1615	Izumo-no-kami (出雲守)	Lower 5th (従五位下)	50,000 koku
3	Honda Masatomo (本多政朝)	1615–1617	Kai-no-kami (甲斐守)	Lower 5th (従五位下)	50,000 koku
Abe clan (fudai) 1617-1619
1	Abe Masatsugu (阿部正次)	1617–1619	Bitchu-no-kami (備中守)	Lower 4th (従四位下)	20,000 koku
	tenryō	1619–1623			
Aoyama clan (fudai) 1623–1625
1	Aoyama Tadatoshi (青山忠俊)	1623–1625	Hoki-no-kami (伯耆守)	Lower 5th (従五位下)	20,000 koku
	tenryō	1625–1638			
Abe clan (fudai) 1638–1702
1	Abe Masayoshi (阿部正能)	1638–1652	Harima-no-kami (播磨守)	Lower 5th (従五位下)	10,000 koku
2	Abe Masaharu (阿部正春)	1671–1702	Iyo-no-kami	Lower 5th (従五位下)	16,000 koku
Inagaki clan (fudai) 1702
1	Inagaki Shigetomi (稲垣重富)	1702–1702	Izumi-no-kami (和泉守)	Lower 5th (従五位下)	15,000 koku
Matsudaira clan (Nagasawa/Ōkōchi branch) (fudai) 1703–1871
1	Ōkōchi Masahisa (松平正久)	1703–1720	Bizen-no-kami (備前守)	Lower 5th (従五位下)	20,000 koku
2	Ōkōchi Masasada (松平正貞)	1720–1749	Bitchu-no-kami (備中守)	Lower 5th (従五位下)	20,000 koku
3	Ōkōchi Masaharu (松平正温)	1749–1767	Bizen-no-kami (備前守)	Lower 5th (従五位下)	20,000 koku
4	Ōkōchi Masanori (松平正升)	1767–1803	Bizen-no-kami (備前守)	Lower 5th (従五位下)	20,000 koku
5	Ōkōchi Masamichi (松平 正路)	1803–1808	Danjo-no-jo (弾正忠)	Lower 5th (従五位下)	20,000 koku
6	Ōkōchi Masakata (松平正敬)	1808–1826	Oribe-no-sho (織部正)	Lower 5th (従五位下)	20,000 koku
7	Ōkōchi Masayoshi (松平正義)	1826–1837	Dewa-no-kami (守)	Lower 5th (従五位下)	20,000 koku
8	Ōkōchi Masatomo (松平正和)	1837–1862	Orebe-no-sho (織部正)	Lower 5th (従五位下)	20,000 koku
9	Ōkōchi Masatada (松平正質	1862–1871	Danjo-no-jo (弾正忠)	Lower 5th (従五位下)	20,000 koku
