= Mount Ashitaka =

Eroded stratovolcano southeast of Mount Fuji

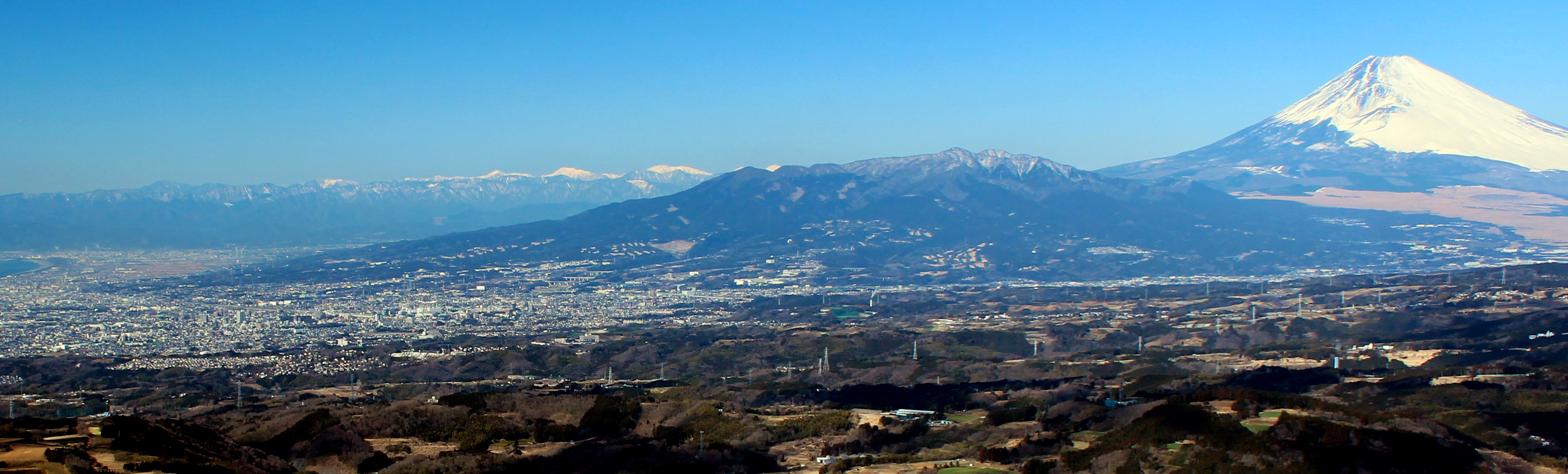
- Southeast Side

Highest point
- Peak: Mount Echizen-dake
- Elevation: 1,504 m (4,934 ft)
- Listing: Volcanoes of Japan
- Coordinates: 35°14′17″N 138°47′38″E

Dimensions
- Length: 7 km (4.3 mi) Southwest-Northeast
- Width: 6 km (3.7 mi) Northwest-Southeast

Naming
- Native name: 愛鷹山 (Japanese)

Geography
- Country: Japan
- Prefecture: Shizuoka

Geology
- Volcanic arc: Izu–Bonin–Mariana Arc
- Last eruption: Pleistocene (extinct)
- Mount Ashitaka (Japan)

Mount Ashitaka (愛鷹山, Ashitakayama) is an eroded extinct stratovolcano in the area south-east of Mount Fuji, Japan. Its highest peak, 1,504 metres (4,934 ft) high, is Mount Echizen-dake, but the complex is named after its secondary peak, Ashitaka-yama, 1,188 m (3,898 ft) high.

== Detailed map ==
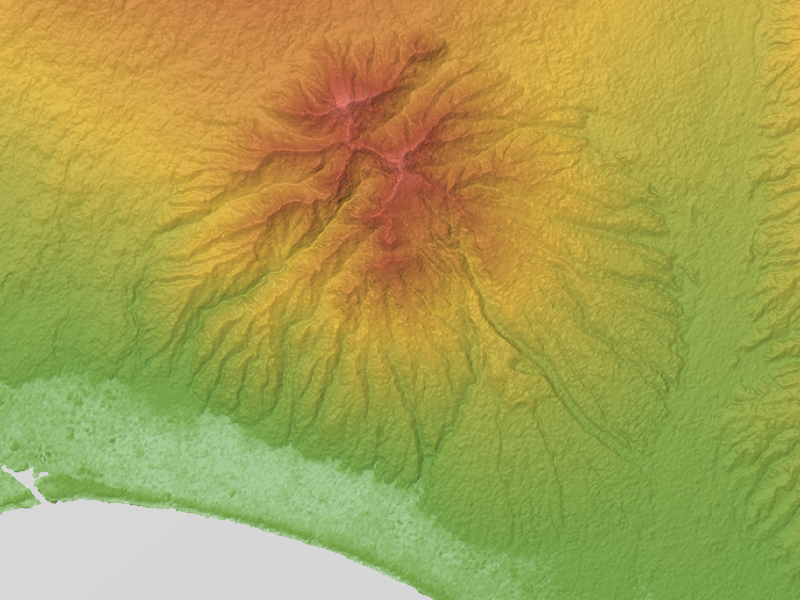
Topographic map of Ashitaka Volcano

== Gallery ==
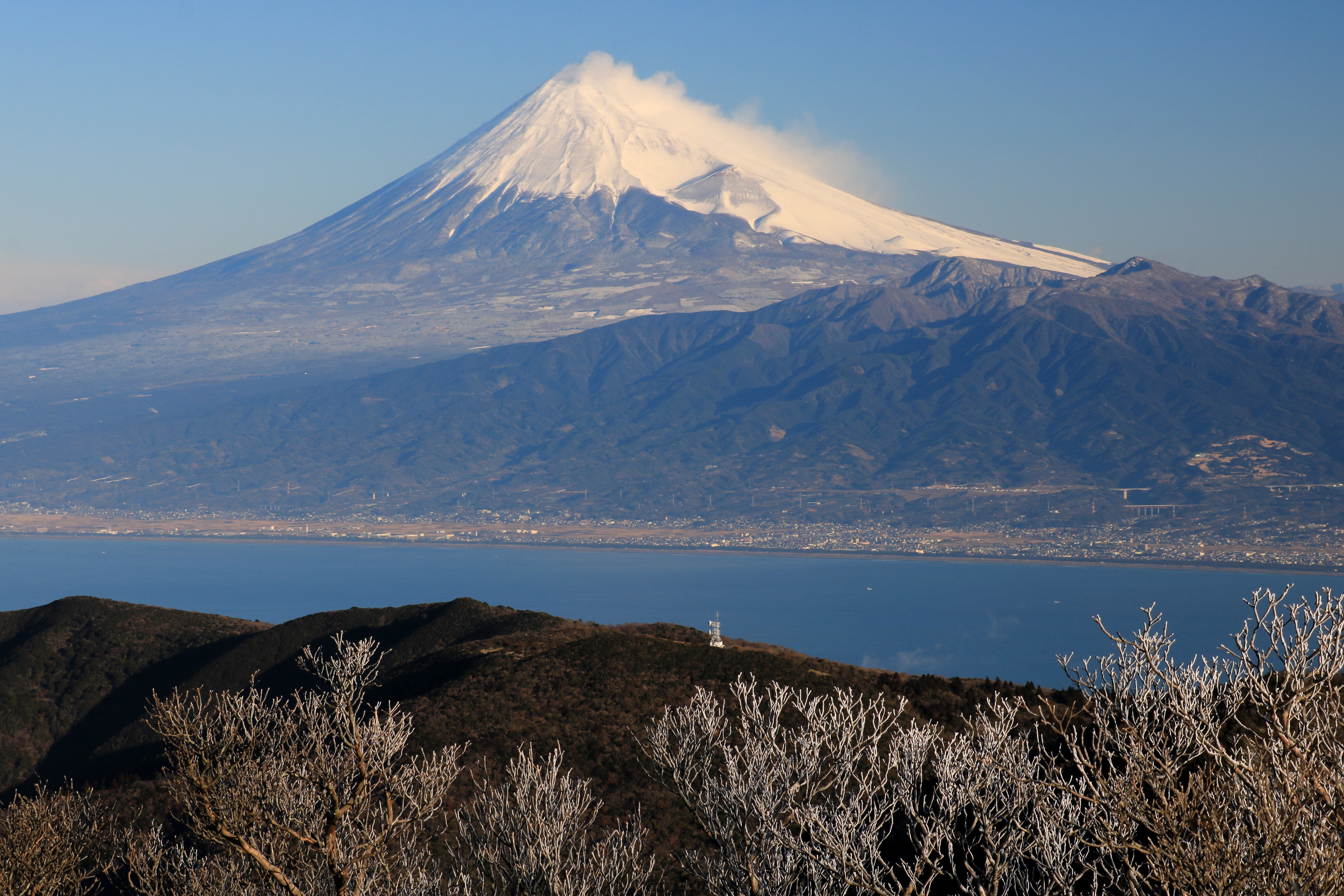
From the south.

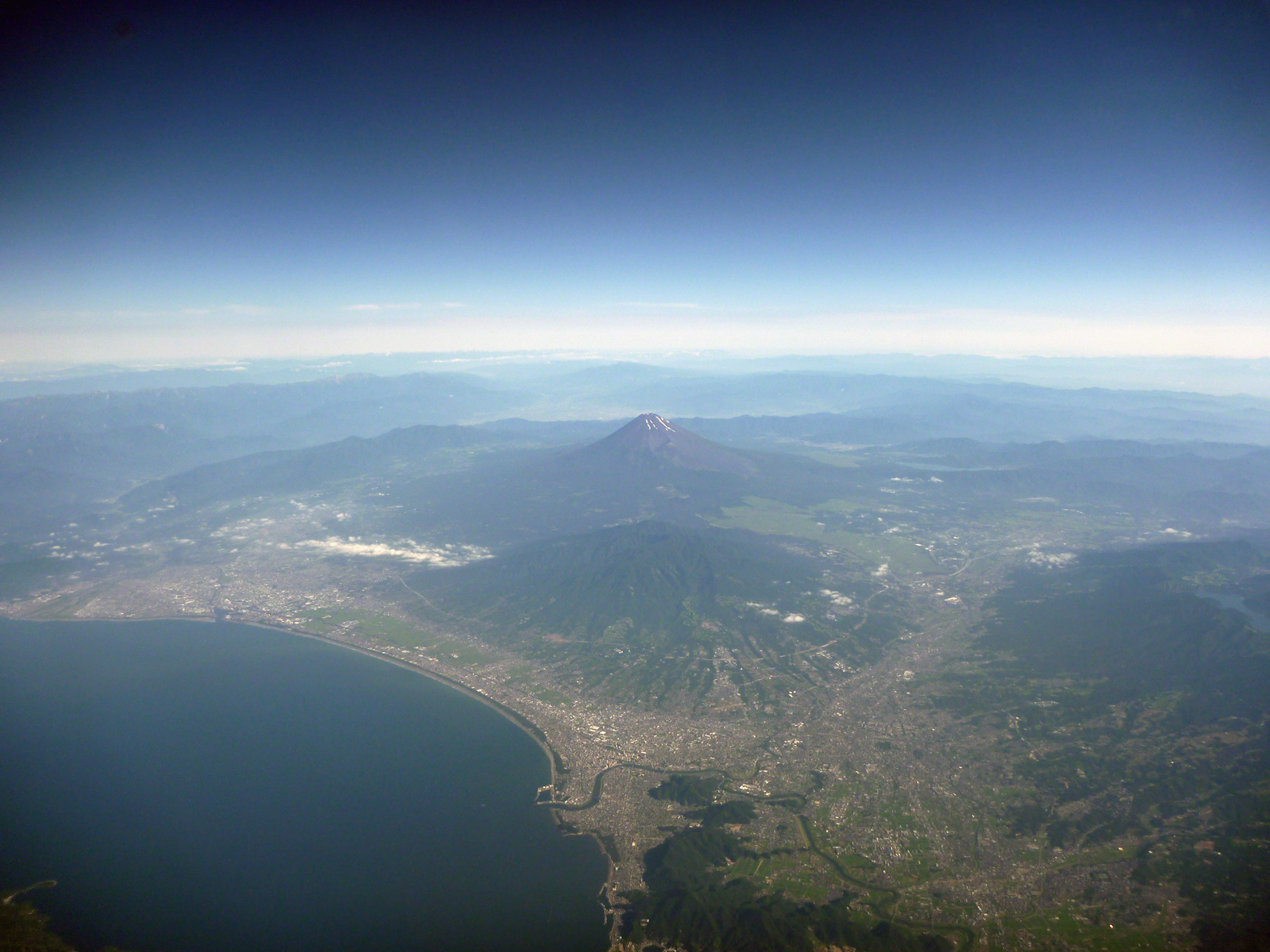
From above

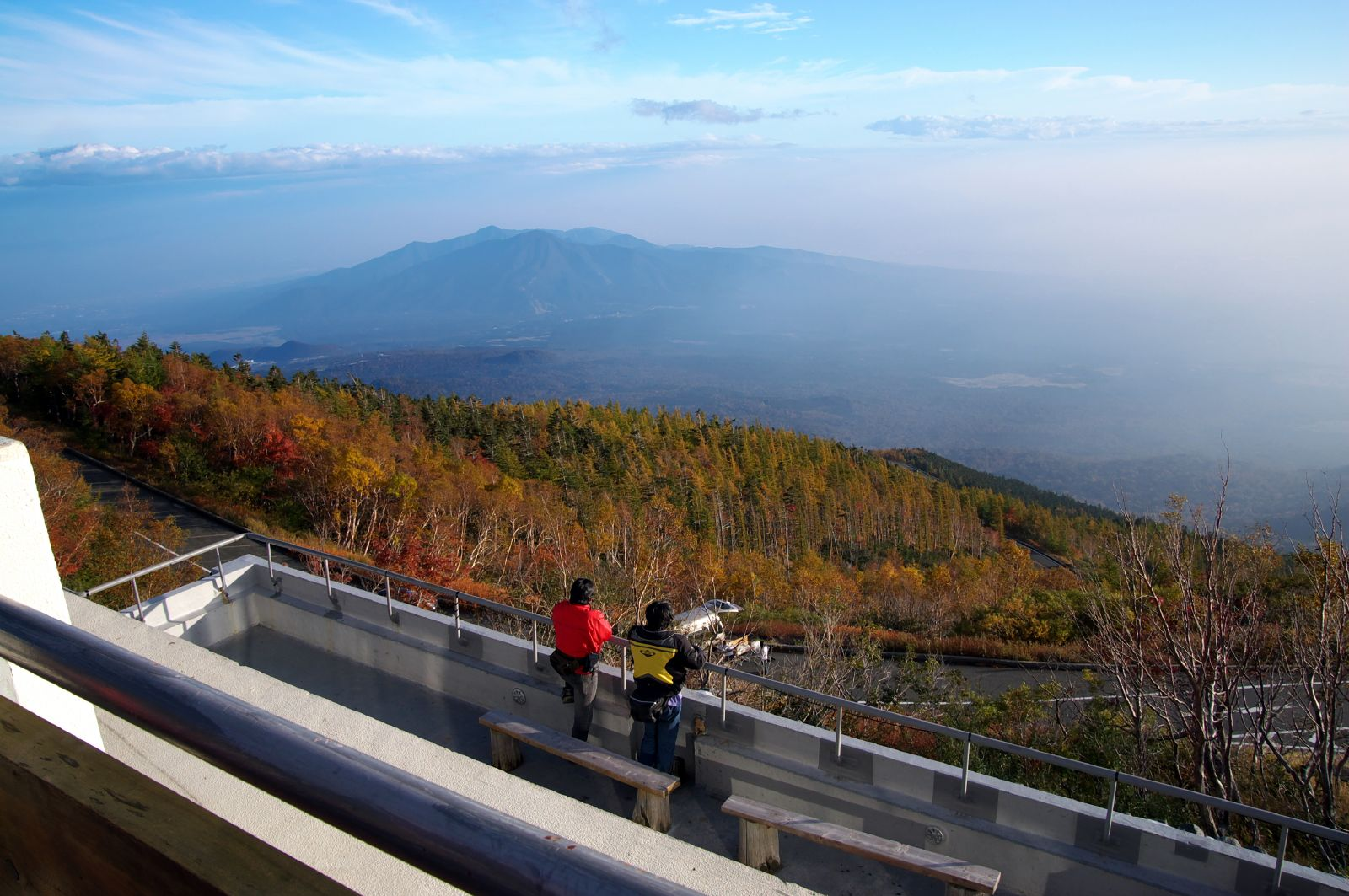
From Mount Fuji

== See also ==
- List of mountains of Japan
