= Masamura =

Masamura may refer to:

- Hōjō Masamura (北条 政村) (1205–1273), Japanese regent
- 4614 Masamura, a main-belt asteroid
- Masamura Pachinko Museum, a pachinko museum in Nagoya, Japan

== See also ==
- Muramasa
