= List of sacred objects in Japanese mythology =

The following is a list of sacred objects in Japanese mythology.

== A ==
- Amenonuhoko (Japanese: 天沼矛)
- Azusa Yumi (Japanese: 梓弓)

== G ==
- Gohei (Japanese: 御幣)
- Goshintai (Japanese: 御神体)

== H ==
- Hama Yumi (Japanese: 破魔弓)
- Heisoku (Japanese: 幣束)

== I ==
- Imperial Regalia of Japan (Japanese: 三種の神器)

== K ==
- Kagura suzu (Japanese: 神楽鈴)
- Kusanagi (Japanese: 草薙の剣)
- Koma-inu (Japanese: 狛犬)

== M ==
- Mitamashiro (Japanese: 御霊代)

== N ==
- Nihongo or Nippongo (Japanese: 日本号)

== O ==
- O-fuda (Japanese: 御札)
- O-mamori (Japanese: 御守 or Japanese: お守り)
- O-mikuji (Japanese: 御御籤, Japanese: 御神籤 or Japanese: おみくじ)
- Onbe (Japanese: 御幣)
- O-nenju (Japanese: 念珠 or Japanese: 数珠)
- Ōnusa (Japanese: 大麻)
- Otegine (Japanese: 御手杵)

== S ==
- Shide (Japanese: 紙垂)
- Shintai (Japanese: 神体)
- Shimenawa (Japanese: 注連縄)
- Suzu (Japanese: 鈴)

== T ==
- Tide jewels
- Three Sacred Treasures (Japanese: 三種の神器)
- The Three Great Spears of Japan
- Tonbokiri (Japanese: 蜻蛉切)
- Torii (Japanese: 鳥居)

== U ==
- Uchide-no-Kozuchi (Japanese: 打ち出の小槌)

== Y ==
- Yasakani no Magatama (Japanese: 八尺瓊曲玉)
- Yata no kagami (Japanese: 八咫鏡)

== See also ==
- Glossary of Shinto
- Japanese mythology
- Shinto
