= Muramasa =

Japanese swordsmith

Muramasa (村正; born before 1501), commonly known as Sengo Muramasa (千子村正), was a famous swordsmith who founded the Muramasa school and lived during the Muromachi period (14th to 16th centuries) in Kuwana, Ise Province, Japan (current Kuwana, Mie).

In spite of their original reputation as fine blades favored by the shōgun Tokugawa Ieyasu and his vassals, the katana swords made by Muramasa gradually became a symbol of the anti-Tokugawa movement. Furthermore, in lore and popular culture from the 18th century, the swords have been regarded as yōtō (妖刀; "wicked katana").

== Work ==
=== Style ===
Much like his unique reputation, Muramasa is known for some fairly unusual features in his work. These attributes are often called by terms prefixed with "Muramasa".

- Muramasa-ba (村正刃; "Muramasa-like edge")—The first particular characteristic of his is the frequent use of a wave-shaped hamon. The hamon of Muramasa is categorized as gunome-midare, that is, it forms randomized wave-like shapes. In particular, Muramasa's gunome-midare has very long, shallow valleys between a cluster of gunome shapes. Furthermore, the front pattern and the back one often coincide well. In regards to hataraki, or metallurgical patterns created through the differential heating and quenching process, his hamon are extremely clear-cut with defined nioi. Muramasa's hamon are also known to be near exact symmetrical duplicates of one another, said to be extremely intricate and difficult in the hamon creation process.
- Muramasa-nakago (村正中心; "Muramasa-like tang")—The other easily identifiable feature one will see on Muramasa blades is the fish-belly (tanagobara) shape of the nakago. Hayashi Shigehide (林重秀) in the 19th century often simulated this style.

=== Notable works ===
Although the school of Muramasa is extremely famous in popular culture, none of their swords are designated as a National Treasure or an Important Cultural Property.

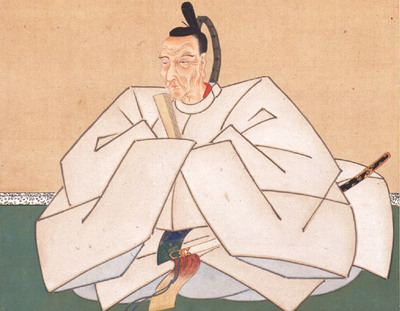
Nabeshima Katsushige

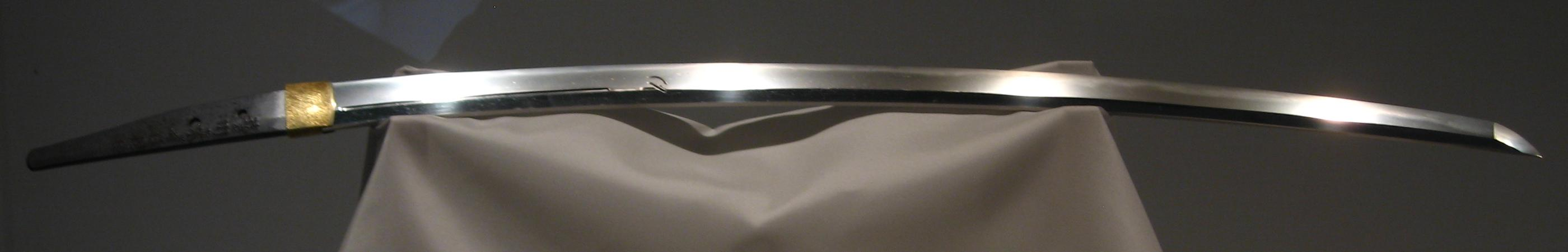
Muramasa (勢州桑名住村正) from the Tokyo National Museum

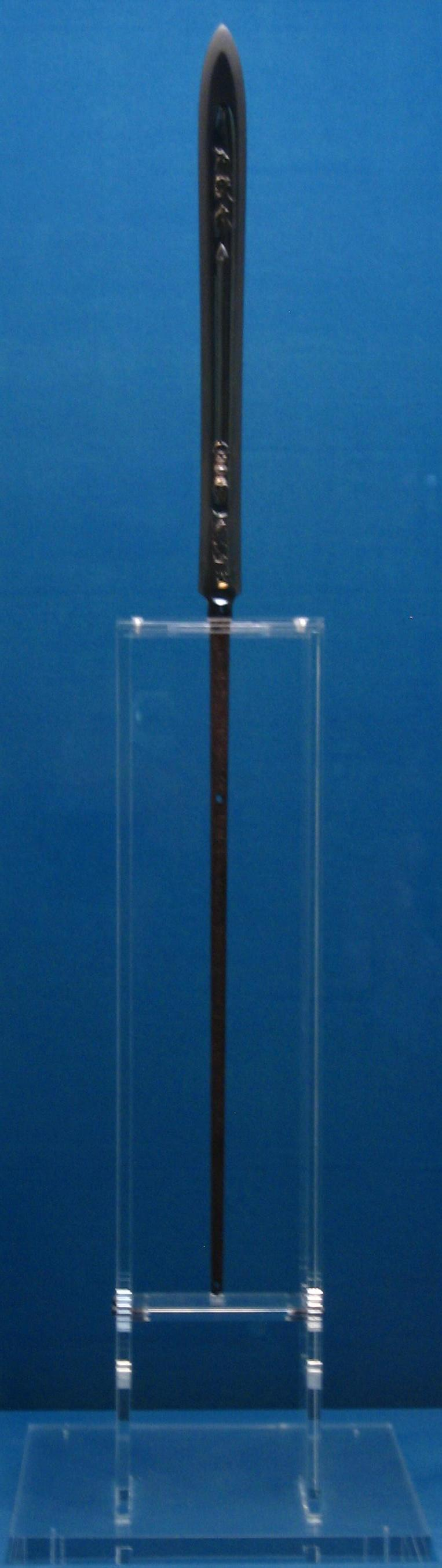
Replica of the Tonbokiri, made in 1847, in the Tokyo National Museum

Myōhō Muramasa (妙法村正; "Muramasa of the Sublime Dharma") is the only sword officially designated as an Important Artwork. Katana, length 66.4 cm, curvature 1.5 cm, bottom width 2.8 cm, shinogi-zukuri, iori-mune, and chū-kissaki nobi (see also Glossary of Japanese swords). The front side contains a sign of Muramasa and a mantra sign myōhō renge kyō (妙法蓮華経) (a mantra from Namu Myōhō Renge Kyō or the Lotus Sutra of Nichiren Buddhism). The back side contains a year sign 永正十年葵酉十月十三日 (13th day of the 10th month of Eishō 10, that is, 10 November 1513). It is highly probable that the date was chosen because the high priest Nichiren died on the 13th day of the 10th month of Kōan 5 (1282). Both sides contain beautiful engravings of Kurikara (Fudō Myō-ō's mythological sword empowered by a burning dragon). The style of the engravings is similar to those of the swordsmith Heianjō Nagayoshi, so some scholars suggest Muramasa studied under Nagayoshi. It is also silver-damascened with characters Nabeshin (鍋信), which suggests that the sword was once in possession of Nabeshima Katsushige (1580–1657), the first daimyō lord of Saga Domain. Later, this sword was given to Katsushige's son Nabeshima Motoshige, the first lord of Ogi Domain, and has been inherited by his successors.

Muramasa's students made excellent weapons too. Fujiwara Masazane, a disciple of Muramasa, forged Tonbokiri, one of the Three Great Spears of Japan. Masazane also forged a sword called Inoshishi-giri (猪切; "boar-slayer") whose name came from a legend that Sakai Tadatsugu killed a wild boar with this sword when accompanying Ieyasu in hunting.

== In history ==
=== Origin ===
The exact origin of the Muramasa school is unknown. The oldest extant sword equipped with both a name sign Muramasa and a date sign shows the year Bunki 1 (1501). Scholars, however, assert several swords signed with Muramasa (but without year signs) are slightly older than 1501 in light of their styles. It is generally thought that the school of Muramasa spanned at least three generations. It is hardly clear when the school disappeared, but some Muramasa swords contain the year sign Kanbun (1661–1673).

Lores in the late Muromachi period (early 16th century–1573) stated that Muramasa was a student of Masamune (c. 1300), the greatest swordsmith in Japan's history, and the Hon'ami family (family dynasty of swordpolishers and sword connoisseurs) commented that his floruit was the Jōji era (1362–1368). Scholars from the Azuchi–Momoyama period (1573–1600) to modern days, however, have dismissed the relationship of Masamune and Muramasa as fantasy because all of extant Muramasa swords are too new to support this theory. Another theory states that Muramasa was a student of Heianjō Nagayoshi, a prominent Kyoto swordsmith known for spears and engravings. The school of Masashige (正重), a notable branch of the Muramasa school, records Masashige died in 1456, so Muramasa was active before 1456 if we believe the record.

Sengo (千子), the epithet of Muramasa, is also covered with myths. A common belief states Muramasa was born in a place called Sengo, but there is no such a place near Kuwana in reality. Another popular legend says the mother of Muramasa worshipped the bodhisattva Senju Kannon and thus he was called Sengo, a shortened form of Senju no ko (千手の子; "son of Senju").

Kanzan Sato claims that the starting year of Muramasa was Entoku and Meiō (1489–1501), that of Muramasa was Tenbun (1532–1539), and that of Muramasa was Tenshō (1573–1591). On the other hand, Suiken Fukunaga considers the floruit of Muramasa was around Shōchō (1428–1429) and the 1501 sword was forged by Muramasa .

=== Relationship to the Tokugawa dynasty ===
Because of their exquisite sharpness, Muramasa swords were favored especially by the samurai of Mikawa (led by Tokugawa Ieyasu, the founder of the Tokugawa shogunate, and his ancestors). Naturally, when a misfortune happens in the Tokugawa clan, it is often related to Muramasa, definitely not because they are "cursed," but simply because most Mikawa samurai used these swords. Matsudaira Kiyoyasu, a grandfather of Ieyasu, was mistakenly killed by his own vassal Abe Masatoyo with a Muramasa. Ieyasu's father Matsudaira Hirotada was also stabbed with a Muramasa by Iwamatsu Hachiya, who lost his mind by excessive drinking. When Ieyasu's first son Matsudaira Nobuyasu was forced to commit suicide (seppuku), his beheader (kaishakunin) Amagata Michitsuna used a Muramasa.

In spite of these unfortunate incidents, Tokugawa Ieyasu and his generation seemed to greatly appreciate Muramasa weapons. Ieyasu himself owned two swords forged by Muramasa and left them to his family; as of 2013, the Owari-Tokugawa family still holds one of the two as an heirloom. Honda Tadakatsu, one of the Four Greatest Generals under Ieyasu, wielded Tonbogiri, a legendary spear forged by Fujiwara Masazane, who studied under the Muramasa school. Sakai Tadatsugu, another of the Four, wielded Inoshishi-giri, a sword forged by Masazane.

Later generations in the shogunate, however, gradually came to think of Muramasa as sinister items. Arai Hakuseki, the official scholar-bureaucrat of the shogunate, commented "Muramasa is associated with not a few sinister events." Even Tokugawa Jikki (1849), the official history book published from the shogunate, cites Kashiwazaki Monogatari (柏崎物語; 1787), which tells a legend that Ieyasu regarded Muramasa as cursed items and banned them from his family, although it is clearly a fabricated story considering the heirloom of the Owari-Tokugawa family.

In the Bakumatsu period (1853–1868), Muramasa was somehow considered to be a curse bringer against the shogunate, and thus shishi (anti-Tokugawa activists) wished to acquire Muramasa blades. Even though the school of Muramasa does not have an exalted or prestigious status to be used by the imperial family in ordinary times, a Muramasa was wielded by Prince Arisugawa Taruhito, the commander-in-chief of the Imperial Army against the Tokugawa shogunate during the Boshin War (1868–1869). To satisfy growing demand, forgeries of Muramasa blades were also often made in this period.

== Cultural significance ==
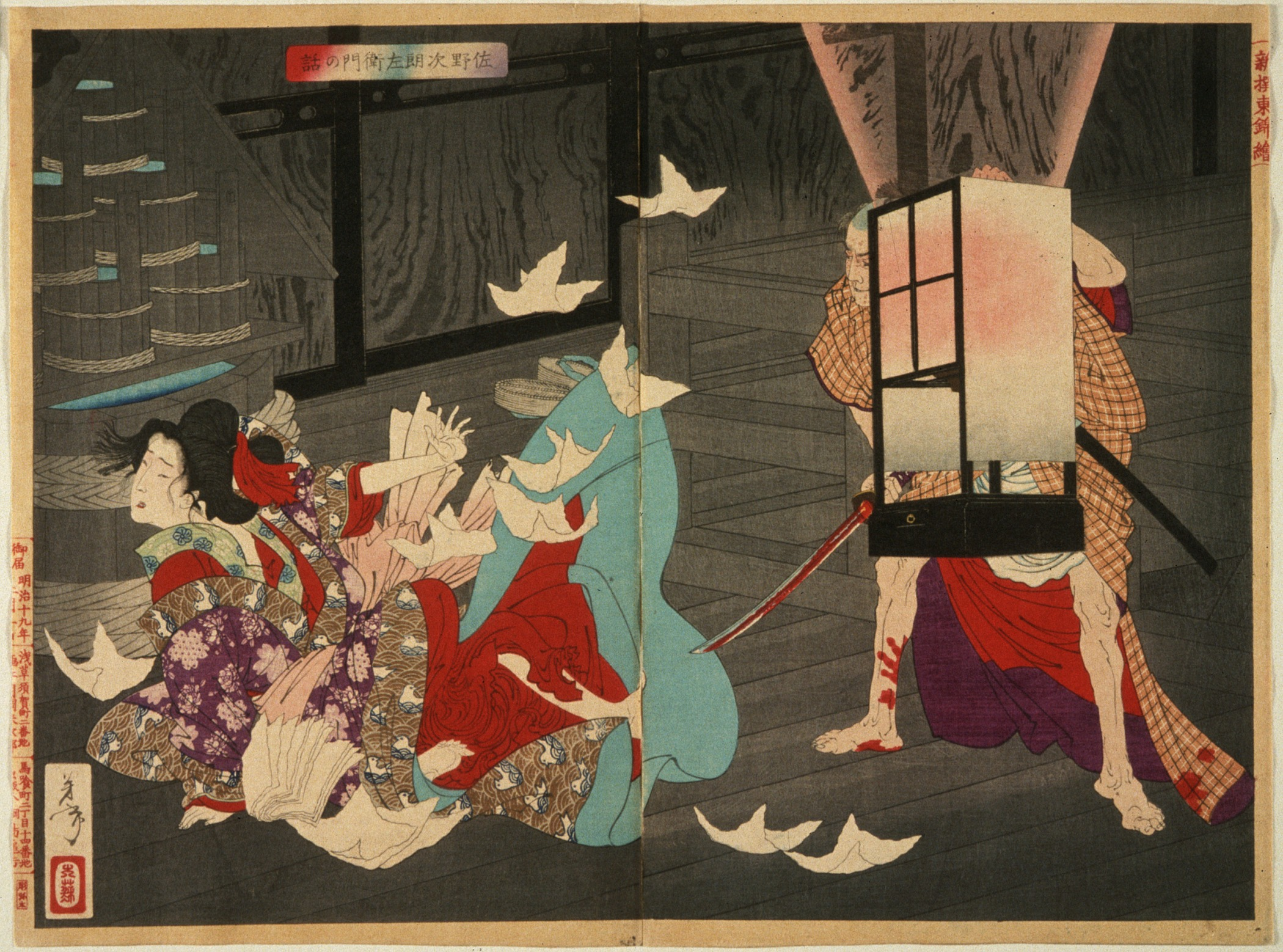
A Tale of Sano Jirōzaemon, Tsukioka Yoshitoshi, 1886. People rumored that Jirōzaemon murdered his lover with a cursed sword. The kabuki drama Kago-tsurube Sato-no-Eizame (1888) claimed that his sword was forged by Muramasa.

In popular culture, Muramasa swords have been often depicted as cursed swords with demonic powers. Oscar Ratti and Adele Westbrook said that Muramasa "was a most skillful smith but a violent and ill-balanced mind verging on madness, that was supposed to have passed into his blades. They were popularly believed to hunger for blood and to impel their warrior to commit murder or suicide." It has also been told that once drawn, a Muramasa blade has to draw blood before it can be returned to its scabbard, even to the point of forcing its wielder to wound himself or commit suicide. Thus, it is thought of as a demonic cursed blade that creates bloodlust in those who wield it.

These images date back to kabuki dramas in the 18–19th century such as Katakiuchi Tenga Jaya Mura (敵討天下茶屋聚) (1781), Hachiman Matsuri Yomiya no Nigiwai (1860), Konoma no Hoshi Hakone no Shikabue (木間星箱根鹿笛) (1880), and Kago-tsurube Sato-no-Eizame'' (1888).

When Matsudaira Geki was driven mad because of power harassment from his superiors and killed them in Edo Castle in the 6th year of Bunsei (1823), townspeople rumored that Geki used a Muramasa, although actually the sword had no sign and there was no evidence to support the rumor. This incident shows how great the influence of kabuki dramas upon common people was.

== See also ==
- Masamune
- Murasame

== Bibliography ==
- Sato, Kanzan (1990) (in Japanese) New Selection of 100 Noteworthy Japanese Swords (新・日本名刀100選, Shin Nihon Meitō Hyakusen). Akita Shoten. ISBN 4-253-90009-7.
- Fukunaga, Suiken (1993) (in Japanese) Encyclopedia of Japanese Swords (日本刀大百科事典, Nihontō Daihyakka Jiten). Yūzankaku. ISBN 4-639-01202-0.
