= Komatsuhime =

Japanese female warrior on Sengoku period

- 小松姫
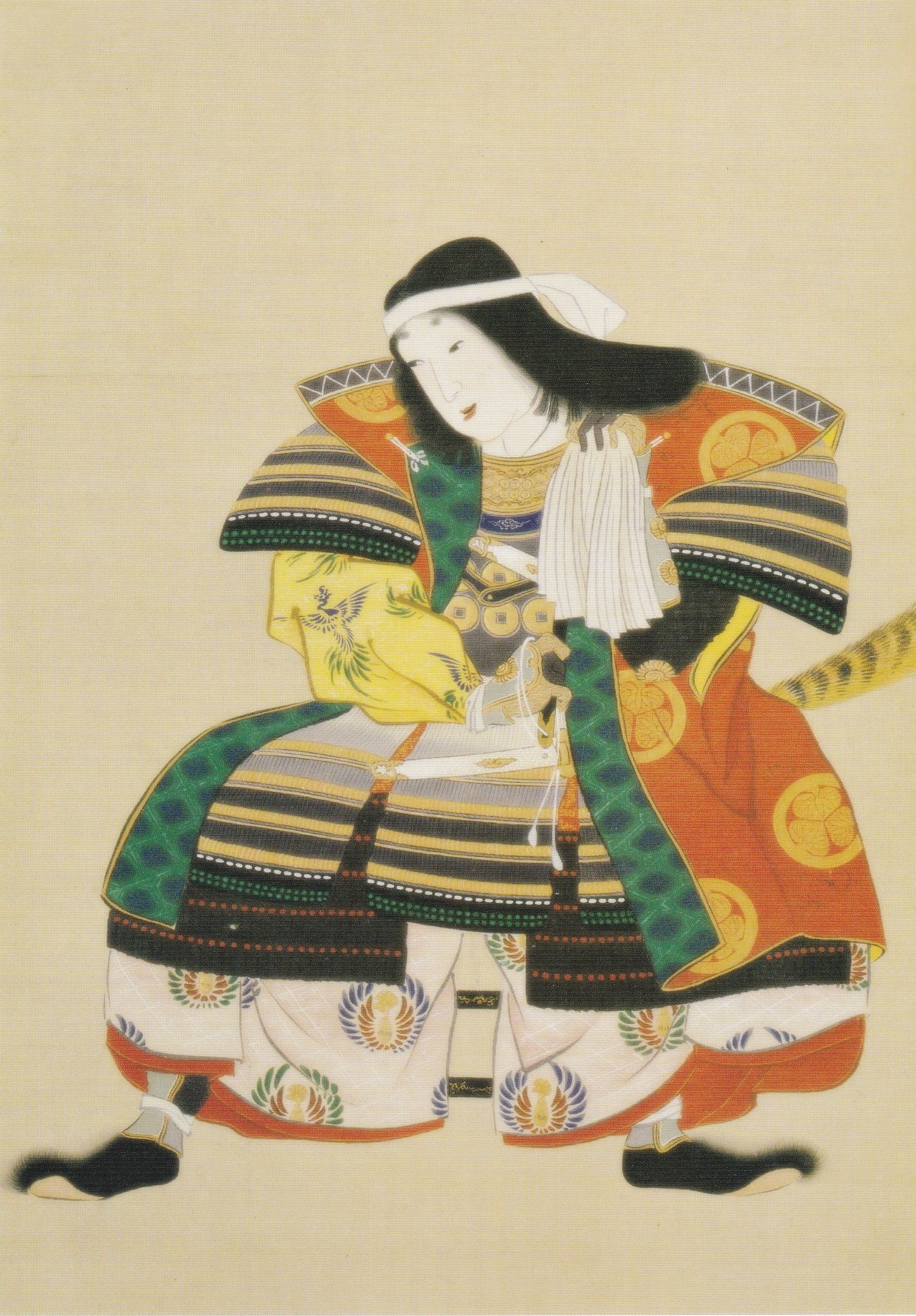

Personal details
- Born: Inahime (稲姫); 1573
- Died: March 27, 1620 (aged 46–47) Kōnosu-shuku Musashi Province
- Spouse: Sanada Nobuyuki
- Children: Manhime; Sanada Nobumasa; Sanada Nobushige
- Parent: Honda Tadakatsu (father)
- Relatives: Honda Tadatomo (brother); Honda Tadamasa (brother); Tokugawa Ieyasu (adopted father); Sanada Masayuki (father-in-law); Sanada Yukimura (brother-in-law); Chikurin-in (sister-in-law)
- Nickname(s): Inahime (稲姫); Onei (於小亥); Dairen-in (大連院)

Military service
- Allegiance: Honda clan Tokugawa clan Sanada clan

Komatsuhime (小松姫; 1573 – March 27, 1620) was a female warrior (onna-musha) during the Azuchi-Momoyama period and early Edo period. Born the daughter of Honda Tadakatsu, she was adopted by lord Tokugawa Ieyasu, before marrying Sanada Nobuyuki. She is described as having been very beautiful, highly intelligent and skillful in fighting.

== Life ==
Komatsuhime was known in her childhood as Inahime (稲姫) and also Onei (於小亥). After witnessing the martial prowess of the Sanada at the First Battle of Ueda Castle, she and her father were captivated by them. Tokugawa Ieyasu himself arranged for Komatsuhime to marry Sanada Nobuyuki, the son of the Sanada lord.

In 1600, when Nobuyuki had decided to cast his lot with the Tokugawa, his father Masayuki (who had not done so) was en route to Ueda Castle, accompanied by his other son and younger brother of Nobuyuki, the famed Sanada Yukimura. The two stopped at Numata Castle, where Komatsuhime was managing affairs. Komatsuhime challenged Masayuki and Yukimura at the entrance of the Castle moments before of the Siege of Ueda. Masayuki relayed a message to her: "I want to see my grandchildren", and in response, the princess emerged, dressed in full battle attire, saying, "Since we have parted ways in this conflict, though you are my father-in-law I cannot allow you into this castle." Masayuki and Yukimura withdrew to a temple, Shōkaku-ji, and were surprised when they saw Komatsuhime (with her children) arrive soon after them, honoring Masayuki's wish.

After the Battle of Sekigahara, during Masayuki and Yukimura's exile, she took charge of sending them food and other daily necessities.

Komatsuhime was praised as a good wife and wise mother (ryōsai kenbo 良妻賢母). She died in Kōnosu, Musashi Province (the present-day city of Kōnosu in Saitama Prefecture) at age 47, while en route to the Kusatsu hot springs. Nobuyuki lamented her death, saying that "the light of my house has been extinguished." Her grave can be found there. Today, in the museum at Ueda Castle, visitors can see items that she used, including her palanquin.

== Family ==
- Father: Honda Tadakatsu
- Husband: Sanada Nobuyuki
- Children:
  - Manhime (b. 1592)
  - Sanada Nobumasa of Matsushiro Domain
  - Sanada Nobushige (1599–1648).

== Cultural references ==
Inahime is the namesake and partial inspiration for Princess Ina in the novel Mercy of the Elements.

=== Video games ===
- Samurai Warriors series
  - Warriors Orochi series
  - Pokémon Conquest (as Ina; her partner Pokémon are Prinplup and Empoleon)
- Sengoku Taisen

=== See also ===
- Sanada Taiheiki, a Japanese drama
- Sanada Maru, a Japanese drama
