= Samurai Warriors =

2004 video game

- North American PlayStation 2 box art featuring Yukimura Sanada and Kunoichi
- Developer: Omega Force
- Publishers: JP: Koei; NA/PAL: Electronic Arts
- Director: Hisashi Koinuma
- Designer: Kazuhiro Echigoya
- Series: Samurai Warriors
- Platforms: PlayStation 2, Xbox, PlayStation Portable
- Release: PlayStation 2: JP: February 11, 2004; NA: May 4, 2004; PAL: June 25, 2004; Xbox: NA: July 13, 2004; JP: July 29, 2004; PAL: September 24, 2004; PlayStation Portable: JP: December 8, 2005; NA: March 7, 2006; EU: March 24, 2006; AU: March 30, 2006
- Genre: Hack and slash
- Modes: Single-player, multiplayer

Samurai Warriors (Note: Japanese: 戦国無双, Hepburn: Sengoku Musō) is a 2004 hack and slash video game developed by Omega Force and published by Koei for the PlayStation 2 and Xbox. It was released outside Japan by Electronic Arts. It is based closely around the Sengoku ("Warring States") period of Japanese history and is a sister series of the Dynasty Warriors series. A port titled Samurai Warriors: State of War was released for the PlayStation Portable, which includes additional multiplayer features.

A sequel, Samurai Warriors 2, was released in 2006 for the PlayStation 2 and Xbox 360, then ported to Microsoft Windows in 2008.

== Gameplay ==
In Samurai Warriors, the player takes the role of a single officer in battle and must fend off hordes of enemy soldiers and defeat the enemy commander. The player has at their disposal a range of combo attacks and crowd-clearing special moves known as Musou attacks. The variety of attacks available increase as the player's character gains levels and new weapons.

Musou attacks can only be performed when the character's Musou gauge is full. The Musou gauge increases when the character inflicts and receives damage. Additionally, if the character is low on health or possesses a special skill, they can use their True Musou attack, a more powerful version of the regular Musou attack.

Each character can equip up to five items before each battle, which will affect their attributes or give them additional abilities. Players can find items which affect their attributes through normal battle by defeating enemy officers or breaking open crates. The items which give characters special abilities are obtained by meeting conditions in specific battles.

Like items, weapons can also be found in battle. Each character has four different types of weapons that they can find. In addition to their base attributes, weapons will randomly have additional attributes attached to them. The value of these bonuses depends on three things: the difficulty level, the stage the player is on and the ranks the character has in the 'Discern' skill. In addition to the random weapon drops, each character has a unique fifth weapon. Unlike the other weapons, the fifth weapons have set bonuses and attributes. Fifth weapons are obtained by meeting conditions in specific battles on either the Hard or Chaos difficulty level.

=== Differences from Dynasty Warriors series ===
Samurai Warriors contains a number of changes to Dynasty Warriors' combat system, most notably the ability to perform free-style combo attacks during Musou attack mode, during which the game enters bullet-time; common soldiers move slowly, but officers are unaffected. Other changes include the ability to perform a roll to dodge attacks, and deflect incoming arrows with their weapon. Additionally, the series has hyper attacks, or the ability to dash while attacking enemy soldiers.

The character development system has been overhauled. There is a new ranking system after battles which depends on five categories:

- Time in which the battle is won.
- Amount of experience earned.
- Missions successfully completed in battle.
- Number of enemies defeated while using a Musou attack.
- Number of enemies killed in total.

Each of these categories is given a rank (from lowest to highest: E, D, C, B, A, S) depending on the player's performance, and then the player is given an overall rank. The higher the rank and the harder the difficulty setting of the game, the more the player's character attributes will increase. In addition to the growth of the character's stats, Skill Points are also awarded. Skill Points are used to buy skills through a skill tree that enhance the character's abilities.

Samurai Warriors introduces an in-battle mission system. Each stage has a number of missions which become available depending on which character the player is controlling and the success or failure of previous missions. Missions include eliminating specific enemy officers, launching sneak attacks on enemy bases or thwarting the plans of the enemy. Success in these missions can be crucial to the outcome of many battles as failure often results in a massive loss of morale to the player's forces. It will also determine the path that will be carved out for the next stage if there is a split route, but one can choose which path to take if both routes had been opened.

=== Officer Training Mode ===
Samurai Warriors gives players the opportunity to create new characters via the officer training mode. In this mode the player creates a new character who trains under a mentor, completing twelve training sessions and a final exam. The player has a variety of tasks available for each training session based on gameplay modes and combat techniques. Each of the different tasks affects different attributes of the character. After the completion of the task the player will be ranked out of a score of 100 points, by getting more points the character's attributes will increase by a greater amount. If the character is defeated during the course of a training session, they will automatically fail and will have to spend one training session resting.

After 12 test sessions have passed, the character must take a final exam. This exam consists of two training sessions back to back. The player has to score a total of 100 points between these two tests in order to pass the exam. If the player completes the final exam successfully then they will become available to use in other gameplay modes.

== Characters ==
The game features a total of 15 characters based on historical figures during the Warring States period of Japan, including daimyō Kenshin Uesugi, Shingen Takeda, and Nobunaga Oda as well as other notable samurai such as Yukimura Sanada and Ranmaru Mori. In addition to the figures who were noted to have fought during the period, the game also made playable a handful of female characters that did not fight in any battles, such as Oichi and Noh. Only five characters are available from the start; others can be unlocked by fulfilling specific requirements such as clearing other character's story modes. In the English version, character's names are written in western order (first name, followed by family name), whereas the official writing of historical names are in reverse (family name, followed by first name).

=== Starting characters ===
- Yukimura Sanada
- Mitsuhide Akechi
- Kenshin Uesugi
- Oichi
- Hanzo Hattori

=== Unlockable characters ===
- Keiji Maeda
- Nobunaga Oda
- Goemon Ishikawa
- Okuni
- Kunoichi
- Magoichi Saika
- Shingen Takeda
- Masamune Date
- Noh
- Ranmaru Mori

=== Unplayable characters ===
- Ieyasu Tokugawa
- Kennyo Honganji
- Lu Bu
- Nagamasa Azai

=== Only available in Xtreme Legends ===
- Hideyoshi Hashiba
- Yoshimoto Imagawa
- Tadakatsu Honda
- Ina

Note: Hideyoshi Hashiba and Yoshimoto Imagawa were unique NPCs in the original game before they were made playable in Samurai Warriors: Xtreme Legends. Tadakatsu Honda, on the other hand, originally appeared in the game as a generic officer, while his daughter Ina was not present in the game in any way.

Lu Bu of Dynasty Warriors fame also appears as an unplayable boss of Survival Mode. Officers created from New Officer Mode are also placed together in the character select screen.

== Music ==
Unlike the traditional Chinese music and rock collaborations in the Dynasty Warriors series, Samurai Warriors combines traditional Japanese instrumentals with techno. The sounds of both Samurai Warriors and Dynasty Warriors are combined in their crossover game, Warriors Orochi.

== Expansions ==
=== Samurai Warriors: Xtreme Legends ===
Samurai Warriors: Xtreme Legends
- Developer: Omega Force
- Publisher: Koei
- Series: Samurai Warriors
- Platform: PlayStation 2
- Release: JP: September 16, 2004; NA: November 9, 2004; PAL: February 25, 2005
- Genre: Hack and slash
- Modes: Single-player, multiplayer

Samurai Warriors: Xtreme Legends (or Samurai Warriors XL for short) is a PlayStation 2 expansion disc for Samurai Warriors. Just like the Dynasty Warriors series, the aim of these expansions is solely to add more content to the game. Players can use the "Import" feature (through switching discs with the original game) to use all features of the original game. Without the original game disc, the player will only have access to the Xtreme Legends content.

This offers two new characters (Tadakatsu Honda and Ina), two unplayable characters (Hideyoshi Hashiba and Yoshimoto Imagawa) were made playable rather than cutscenes and a brand new mission and map. This also offers new weapons, items, skills, three new versus modes, a new survival mode, and fixes several problems. A new difficulty level Novice is also added which is easier than Easy and targeted for beginners.

Even after they reached rank 20 characters could still gain skill points and increase their attributes without having to the reset the character to default. Samurai Warriors: Xtreme Legends extended this further, by adding even more powerful sixth weapons to earn. These can only be discovered by playing on Chaos mode (or Hard mode, if the correct bonus is purchased).

Exclusive to Samurai Warriors: Xtreme Legends, through the completion of special tasks, the player can earn Bonus Points in order to purchase special features. These features include additional costumes for characters, voice sound tests, lowering the difficulty required to unlock the fifth and sixth weapons and the ability to break the default limits for character's stats. Methods of earning bonus points include the following: earning all of a character's endings, unlocking rare items and weapons and successfully creating new characters.

=== Samurai Warriors: State of War ===
A port to the PlayStation Portable, called Samurai Warriors: State of War, was released in Japan on December 8, 2005 and March 7, 2006 in North America. It has a number of additional multiplayer features.

== Pachi Slot Sengoku Musou/Sengoku Rush ==
This is a slot machine based game featuring Yukimura Sanada, Hanzo Hattori and Keiji Maeda as playable characters with their own stories using character models from Samurai Warriors. Noh, Masamune Date and Hideyoshi Hashiba are included as normal bosses, while Nobunaga Oda is a special boss. Other characters who make non-playable appearances are Kunoichi, Shingen Takeda, Okuni and Goemon Ishikawa.

== Reception ==
=== Samurai Warriors ===
Samurai Warriors

Aggregate scores
Aggregator	Score	
Aggregator	PS2	Xbox
GameRankings	73.36%	71.38%
Metacritic	73/100	71/100

Review scores
Publication	Score	
Publication	PS2	Xbox
Edge	5/10	N/A
Electronic Gaming Monthly	7/10	N/A
Eurogamer	N/A	7/10
Famitsu	34/40	N/A
Game Informer	7.5/10	7.5/10
GamePro	3/5	N/A
GameRevolution	C+	N/A
GameSpot	7.3/10	7.3/10
GameSpy	3/5	N/A
GameZone	8.7/10	8.2/10
IGN	8.5/10	7.4/10
Official U.S. PlayStation Magazine	4/5	N/A
Official Xbox Magazine (US)	N/A	7.5/10
X-Play	N/A	3/5
Playboy	63%	N/A

The PS2 release of Samurai Warriors sold a million copies within a month in Japan and reached the Japanese platinum chart with a total of 1.06 million. It was awarded an award of excellence in CESA's 2004 Game Awards and a 34 out of 40 rating from Famitsu.

The game was met with mixed reviews from Western critics. GameRankings and Metacritic gave it a score of 73% and 73 out of 100 for the PS2 version, and 71% and 71 out of 100 for the Xbox version.

Most reviewers criticized the game's visual and technical similarities to the Dynasty Warriors series as the cause. What earned the most praise was the RPG element added into the game as it deviates from its spiritual predecessor by adding a higher replay value for gamers. The Create a Character mode was received with mixed results. Gameplanet commented that it is "well implemented", allowing players to accurately play a character made for them while GameSpot regarded the option as "a nice touch" but "rather tiresome" in the end. The innovations made were still met with criticism for the genre as a whole, with Eurogamer being critical to this aspect.

=== Xtreme Legends ===
Samurai Warriors: Xtreme Legends

Aggregate scores
Aggregator	Score
GameRankings	71.89%
Metacritic	72/100

Review scores
Publication	Score
Famitsu	34/40
Game Informer	6.75/10
GameSpot	7.2/10
GameSpy	3/5
GameZone	7.9/10
IGN	7.5/10
Official U.S. PlayStation Magazine	3/5

Xtreme Legends was met with average reception; GameRankings gave it a score of 72%, while Metacritic gave it 72 out of 100.

=== State of War ===
Samurai Warriors: State of War

Aggregate scores
Aggregator	Score
GameRankings	65.27%
Metacritic	64/100

Review scores
Publication	Score
Eurogamer	6/10
Game Informer	7/10
GamePro	3.5/5
GameSpot	6.5/10
GameSpy	3.5/5
GamesRadar+	3.5/5
GameZone	6.9/10
IGN	5.8/10
Official U.S. PlayStation Magazine	4/5
X-Play	2/5

State of War was met with mixed reception, as GameRankings gave it a score of 65%, while Metacritic gave it 64 out of 100.

== Legacy ==
The game's success led to numerous sequels released under the Samurai Warriors title. The series has sold over 8 million copies worldwide as of August 2021.
