= Warriors Orochi =

2007 video game

- North American PlayStation 2 cover art
- Developer: Omega Force
- Publisher: Koei
- Director: Minoru Honda
- Designer: Atsushi Ichiyanagi
- Series: Dynasty Warriors; Samurai Warriors; Warriors Orochi
- Platforms: PlayStation 2, Xbox 360, PlayStation Portable, Microsoft Windows
- Release: PlayStation 2, Xbox 360: JP: March 21, 2007; KOR: June 8, 2007 (PS2); NA: September 18, 2007; EU: September 21, 2007; AU: September 27, 2007; NZ: September 28, 2007; PlayStation Portable: JP: February 21, 2008; NA: March 25, 2008; AU: March 27, 2008; EU: March 28, 2008; Windows: JP: March 20, 2008; NA: March 25, 2008; EU: March 28, 2008; AS: April 9, 2008
- Genre: Hack and slash
- Modes: Single-player, multiplayer

Warriors Orochi (無双OROCHI, Musō Orochi) is a hack and slash video game for PlayStation 2 and Xbox 360, developed by Koei and Omega Force. It is a crossover of two of Koei's popular video game series, Dynasty Warriors and Samurai Warriors (specifically Dynasty Warriors 5 and Samurai Warriors 2) and the first title in the Warriors Orochi series.

The game was released on March 21, 2007, in Japan, and in September for North America, Europe, Australia and New Zealand. The game came out for the Xbox 360 in Japan on September 13, and the European version came out on the same date as the PlayStation 2 version in the North America. The game was ported to the PlayStation Portable, released in Japan in February 2008, and in March 25 for North America and Europe. A PC version was released in North America on March 25 of the same year.

== Plot ==
The fictional events of the game begin when the Serpent King Orochi created a rift in time and space. By creating a twisted new world and bringing together warriors from the Three Kingdoms era of China and the Warring States period of Japan (more than 1,300 years apart in history), Orochi wished to test the might of the warriors of these two eras.

In the story, the Shu forces were in shambles after their battle with Orochi. Many Shu officers were captured by Orochi, went missing, or joined other forces. Zhao Yun was captured by Orochi's forces and held prisoner in Ueda Castle. He is later rescued by Zuo Ci, Yoshihiro Shimazu and Xing Cai. Zuo Ci revealed startling news to Zhao Yun, which led him to embark upon a quest with help from unexpected allies. In the Meantime, Cao Cao had disappeared in his battle against Orochi's forces. His son, Cao Pi, took up leadership of the Wei clan and allied himself with Orochi, under the offer sent by his strategist, Da Ji. There were a few Wei officers who refused to surrender, or ended up joining other forces opposing Orochi. Under the new alliance, Orochi orders Cao Pi to suppress all those who oppose him. Though Cao Pi obediently obeys Orochi's every command, he has an ulterior motive that he is planning as the story progresses. While, Orochi uses the captive Sun Jian and other Wu officers to blackmail the Sun family into servitude. Orochi demanded that rebel leaders and officers be turned over in exchange for the release of the captives. Sun Ce is the first to rebel against Orochi, under the guidance of Sakon Shima, and much to the disapproval of his siblings, Quan and Shang Xiang. Meanwhile, Nobunaga Oda, Shingen Takeda, and Kenshin Uesugi each maintained a resistance force against Orochi's army. Even in this most dire of circumstances, the three daimyōs refuse to work together against Orochi. Each of them were focused on assimilating smaller resistance forces spread throughout the land into their own forces.

In the original Japanese version, the Orochi officers are named after various legendary monsters (youkai) in both Chinese and Japanese folklores, while the English version has them named after various species of snakes (using their common names) as a pun to Orochi being the Serpent King. The Orochi officers all share the same character model, and are unplayable enemy characters.

== Characters ==
A total of 79 characters encompasses the roster of Warriors Orochi: 48 from Dynasty Warriors, 29 from Samurai Warriors (including Yoshimoto Imagawa, Kunoichi and Goemon Ishikawa from the first Samurai Warriors, left out in its sequel), and two new characters: the titular character and primary villain, Orochi (遠呂智/八歧大蛇) the Serpent King and the mythological beast of Yamato; and Da Ji (妲己), the villainous concubine of King Zhou of Shang from Fengshen Yanyi. Orochi wields a large scythe, named "Eternal Agony", while Da Ji fights with two floating orbs, called "the Orbs of Ruin".

There are many generic, non-playable officers who are also part of the game, all taken from the Samurai Warriors and Dynasty Warriors games. There are also exclusive non-playable officers that are in Orochi's forces.

* Denotes new characters to the series

Bold denotes default characters

Shu	Wei	Wu	Other	Samurai 1	Samurai 2
Guan Ping	Cao Cao	Da Qiao	Da Ji*	Goemon Ishikawa	Ginchiyo Tachibana
Guan Yu	**Cao Pi**	Gan Ning	Diao Chan	**Hanzō Hattori**	**Hideyoshi Toyotomi**
Huang Zhong	Cao Ren	Huang Gai	Dong Zhuo	Kenshin Uesugi	**Ieyasu Tokugawa**
Jiang Wei	Dian Wei	Ling Tong	Lu Bu	Keiji Maeda	Ina
Liu Bei	Pang De	Lu Meng	Meng Huo	Kunoichi	Kanetsugu Naoe
Ma Chao	Sima Yi	Lu Xun	Orochi*	Magoichi Saika	Kotarō Fūma
Pang Tong	Xiahou Dun	**Sun Ce**	Yuan Shao	**Mitsuhide Akechi**	Masamune Date
Wei Yan	Xiahou Yuan	Sun Jian	Zhang Jiao	**Nobunaga Oda**	Mitsunari Ishida
**Xing Cai**	**Xu Huang**	Sun Quan	Zhu Rong	Nō	Musashi Miyamoto
Yue Ying	Xu Zhu	Sun Shang Xiang	Zuo Ci	Oichi	Nagamasa Azai
Zhang Fei	Zhang He	Taishi Ci		Okuni	Nene
**Zhao Yun**	**Zhang Liao**	Xiao Qiao		Ranmaru Mori	Sakon Shima
Zhuge Liang	Zhen Ji	Zhou Tai		Shingen Takeda	Tadakatsu Honda
		Zhou Yu		Yukimura Sanada	**Yoshihiro Shimazu**
					Yoshimoto Imagawa

== Gameplay ==
The following are some new game play mechanics added exclusively to Warriors Orochi:

- Players can take any three characters from the Dynasty and Samurai Warriors lineup into battle, forming a party, as seen in Marvel vs. Capcom. Players can switch between the characters in their party any time during battle. Those that are inactive are invisible, during which their health and Musou energy regenerate. If one character is defeated, the game ends in defeat, even if the player's other two characters are still intact.
- All characters are grouped into one of the following character classes: Power, Technique and Speed. The first type hits hard and relatively (but not completely) slow; the second type demonstrates more "fancy" fighting moves with moderate strength and speed, and is able to perform a "counter-strike"; the third type usually attacks and moves faster than the previous two types, and is the only type that can double jump.
- All characters have a new move called an Enhanced Strike. This move consumes Musou energy with all Power characters and sometimes with characters of other classes, and varies by character and their class.
- All characters have specific personal items that can be acquired by completing character-specific objectives. This also unlocks special features. These replace the final weapons of previous games, which had similar requirements, but are only another more powerful weapon in the game.
- Weapon improvements are performed with the new Weapon Fusion system. Players can combine attributes of multiple weapons of one character into one more powerful weapon.

The core gameplay combines elements from Dynasty Warriors 5 and Samurai Warriors 2. Many of these elements have been revised for Warriors Orochi:

- Character selection screen: Dynasty Warriors characters are divided by their respective kingdoms. Samurai Warriors characters are divided by which game they made their first appearance.
- Correct pronunciation of names: Unlike the Dynasty Warriors games, the English-language version of Warriors Orochi utilizes the correct pronunciations of certain Three Kingdoms officers. The best example is Cao Cao, who in Dynasty Warriors is pronounced as "cow cow". Cao Cao is now "ts'au ts'au" following traditional Chinese pronunciation. This new pronunciation method also applies for Cao Pi, Cao Ren, and Xing Cai.
- Art gallery: Showcases CG art and trailers from past Warriors games. Trailers are removed from the US PlayStation 2, Xbox 360, PSP and PC versions.
- Chaos difficulty: This highest difficulty level is available in Warriors Orochi at the start. Dynasty Warriors 5 and Samurai Warriors 2, in comparison, offered the Chaos difficulty only after completing special requirements.
- Game soundtrack: Composed of the original music from both Dynasty Warriors' rock-based soundtrack and Samurai Warriors' techno-based soundtrack. A few new songs were created exclusively for Warriors Orochi. Lu Bu's theme song is given a rearrangement combining both rock and techno music styles.
- Multiplayer: Player 2 uses same team as Player 1, albeit with a swapped palette.
- Game stages: Recycles stages from both games, some of which are modified by Orochi's supernatural influence. Such stages have burnt ground and 16th-century Japanese buildings placed on some Dynasty Warriors stages. Koshi Castle, a stage made exclusively for this game, is the location of the final battle against Orochi for all stories.
- Equipment: Abilities acquired by characters during the game are equipped, as seen in Samurai Warriors 2. Using an element from the first Samurai Warriors game, a limit is placed on the number of Abilities equipped at one time.
- Camera control: Players are given complete control over the game camera, similar to Samurai Warriors 2.
- Special attacks: Following Samurai Warriors 2 to an extent, characters perform their own Enhanced Strikes, varied by characters and their classes.
- Weapon deadlocks: No indication as to which character holds the advantage during a deadlock, following Dynasty Warriors 5. In Samurai Warriors 2, a tug-of-war-style bar is displayed during a deadlock, indicating which character holds the advantage.
- Double jumps: Expands on the concept of Samurai Warriors 2. All Speed-class characters in Warriors Orochi can perform an Aerial Thrust, which keeps them in the air but propels them forward (or in a given direction as per player control); this can be used for example to avoid certain attacks or to reposition on the fly.
- Additional attacks: This is the ability for characters to perform hits beyond the standard six. Characters in Warriors Orochi gain this ability with experience, following Samurai Warriors. Dynasty Warriors characters also gain an additional three attacks after their regular combo once they reach a high proficiency; the attacks are the same as the "Evolution" attacks from the Dynasty Warriors PSP games.
- Fourth weapons: These are the most powerful weapons a character can possess. They are obtained in Hard mode on a stage rated 3-stars or higher, or any stage in Chaos mode. Fourth weapons contain random elements. Lu Bu and Tadakatsu Honda possess the strongest of those weapons, both with Strength values up to 100.
- Calling horses: An ability exclusive to Yukimura Sanada and Keiji Maeda in Samurai Warriors 2, any character can perform this ability in Warriors Orochi. If the player character(s) did not start the game on horseback, however, s/he will be only able to call a low-level steed.
- Special mounts: Only the Red Hare from Dynasty Warriors 5 and Matsukaze from Samurai Warriors 2 are present when a player acquires a Level 10 Cavalier ability in the game. They can also be found mid-game by defeating either a mounted Guan Yu, Lu Bu or Maeda Keiji.
- Facial expressions: All characters, including the Dynasty Warriors characters, display different facial expressions in their in-game avatar when speaking, following Samurai Warriors 2.
- Base captains: Following Samurai Warriors 2, base captains carry shields, allowing them to withstand several hits before taking damage.
- Objectives: Following Dynasty Warriors 5, some stages have certain objectives that, if completed successfully, greatly help the player in winning the stage. Not implemented is a feature from Samurai Warriors 2, which awards the player additional gold if objectives are completed successfully.

The following elements were not incorporated into Warriors Orochi:

- Musou Rage from Dynasty Warriors 5.
- Musou refill from attacking Dynasty Warriors 5.
- Use of bow and arrow from Dynasty Warriors 5 (except the character that already had bow as weapon).
- Bodyguards from Dynasty Warriors 5.
- Dodge Roll from Samurai Warriors 2.
- Special Stances from Samurai Warriors 2. They are included in Warriors Orochi as Enhanced Strikes.
- Multi-tiered Musou Gauges from Samurai Warriors 2.
- Counter Attack (performed on the PlayStation 2 version by holding the guard button and pressing the charge button) from Dynasty Warriors 5. Only Technique-type characters can counterattack by pressing the R1 button (PlayStation 2 version) when attacked.
- The Create-A-Warrior system from Dynasty Warriors 5: XL/Empires and Samurai Warriors 2: Empires.
- The Double Jump ability of the ninjas from Samurai Warriors 2, although characters with the speed abilities can jump forward after the first normal jump.

== Reception ==
Reception

Aggregate scores
Aggregator	Score			
Aggregator	PC	PS2	PSP	Xbox 360
GameRankings	52%	53.59%	64.50%	56.92%
Metacritic	51/100	55/100	62/100	53/100

Review scores
Publication	Score			
Publication	PC	PS2	PSP	Xbox 360
Destructoid	N/A	N/A	8/10	N/A
Eurogamer	N/A	N/A	N/A	6/10
Game Informer	N/A	5.75/10	N/A	5.75/10
GamePro	N/A	2.5/5	N/A	N/A
GameRevolution	N/A	N/A	N/A	D−
GameSpot	N/A	5/10	4/10	5/10
GameSpy	N/A	N/A	4/5	N/A
GameTrailers	N/A	6.9/10	N/A	6.9/10
GameZone	N/A	N/A	7/10	5.8/10
IGN	5.7/10	6/10	6.5/10	6.3/10
Official Xbox Magazine (US)	N/A	N/A	N/A	6/10
PC Gamer (US)	41%	N/A	N/A	N/A

Warriors Orochi was met with average to mixed reception. GameRankings and Metacritic gave it a score of 65% and 62 out of 100 for the PSP version; 57% and 53 out of 100 for the Xbox 360 version; 54% and 55 out of 100 for the PlayStation 2 version; and 52% and 51 out of 100 for the PC version.

As of May 2008, the game sold over 1.5 million units worldwide.

== See also ==
- List of Warriors Orochi characters
