= Honda Tadakatsu =

16th-Century AD Japanese samurai, general and daimyo

- 本多 忠勝
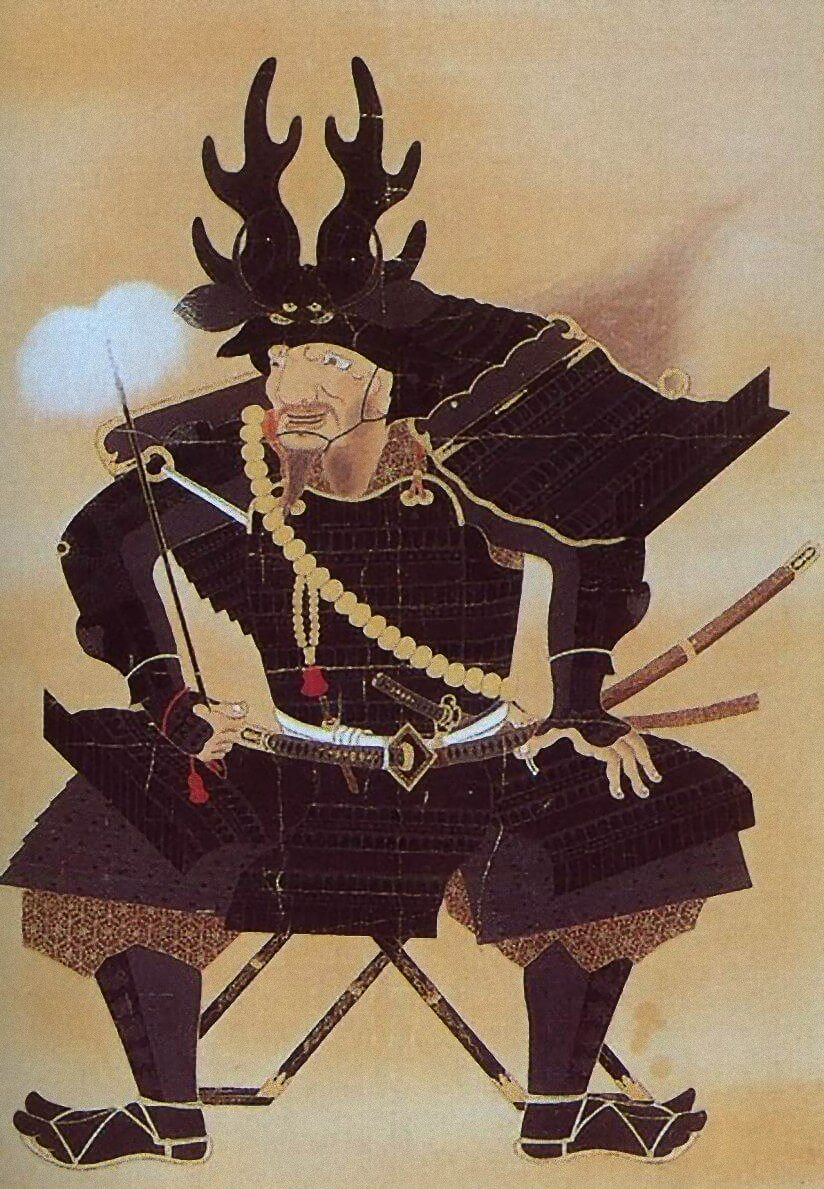

Daimyo of Ōtaki Domain
- In office 1590–1601
- Succeeded by: Honda Tadatomo

Daimyo of Kuwana Domain
- In office 1601–1609
- Succeeded by: Honda Tadamasa

Personal details
- Born: March 17, 1548 Mikawa Province, Japan
- Died: December 3, 1610 (aged 62) Edo, Japan
- Relations: Sanada Nobuyuki (son-in-law)
- Children: Komatsuhime; Honda Tadamasa; Honda Tadatomo
- Parent: Honda Tadataka (father)

Military service
- Allegiance: Matsudaira clan Tokugawa clan Eastern Army; Tokugawa shogunate
- Rank: Buke Shitsuyaku
- Unit: Honda clan
- Battles/wars: Battle of Washizu Fort; Siege of Ōtaka Castle; Mikawa Ikkō-ikki uprising; Siege of Yoshida Castle (1564); Battle of Anegawa; Tokugawa-Takeda clan conflict (1572 - 1582); Battle of Hitokotosaka; Battle of Mikatagahara; Siege of Nagashino castle; Siege of Komyo castle; Battle of Nagashino; Siege of Suwahara castle; Battle of Tanaka castle (1581); Siege of Takatenjin (1581); Journey in Iga; Tokugawa-Toyotomi conflict (1584); Siege of Kanie Castle; Battle of Komaki and Nagakute; Odawara Campaign; Siege of Sakura Castle; Siege of Tamanawa Castle; Siege of Iwatsuki Castle; Siege of Hachigata Castle; Siege of Mangi Castle; Kunohe rebellion; Sekigahara Campaign; Battle of Takegahana castle; Battle of Gifu Castle; Battle of Kuisegawa; Battle of Sekigahara

Honda Tadakatsu (本多 忠勝; March 17, 1548 – December 3, 1610), also called Honda Heihachirō (本多 平八郎) was a Japanese samurai, general, and daimyo of the late Sengoku through early Edo periods, who served Tokugawa Ieyasu.

Honda Tadakatsu was one of the Tokugawa Four Heavenly Kings (Shitennō) along with Ii Naomasa, Sakakibara Yasumasa, and Sakai Tadatsugu. It was reported that he never suffered a single wound despite participating in a total of 57 military campaigns throughout his life.

For his fighting prowess on the battlefield Honda Tadakatsu earned the praise of various contemporary figures such as Oda Nobunaga, Toyotomi Hideyoshi, and Ieyasu himself.

== Biography ==
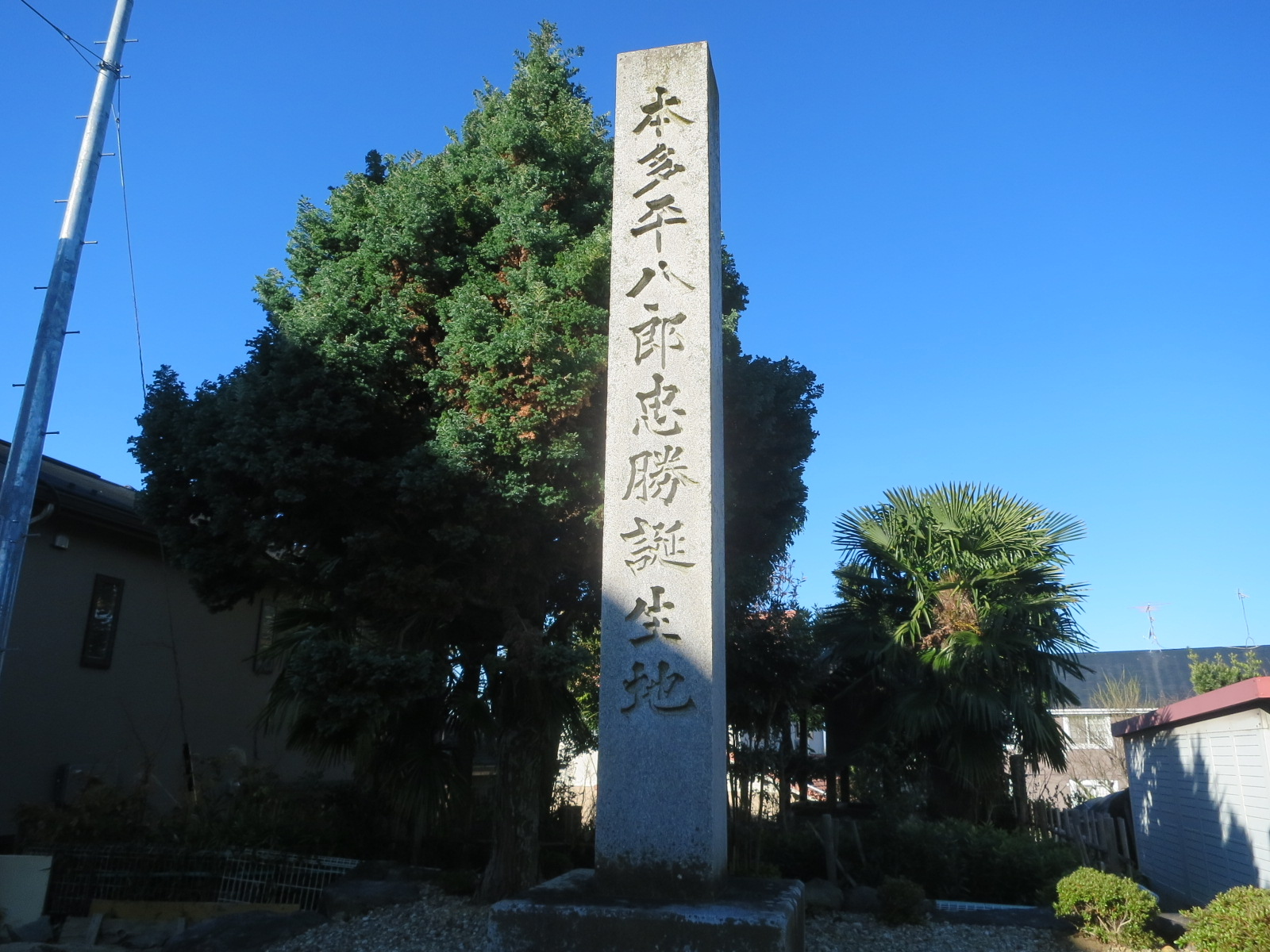
Honda Tadakatsu's birthplace monument（Okazaki, Aichi Prefecture）

Tadakatsu was born in 1548, in Kuramae, Nukata, Mikawa Province (present-day Nishi-Kuramae, Okazaki, Aichi Prefecture), the eldest son of Honda Tadataka. The Honda clan was one of the oldest Anjō fudai families, a family of fudai daimyo who had been serving Tokugawa Ieyasu since he was in Anjō.

In 1560, Tadakatsu participated in his first battle in the battle of Washizu Fort, where he accompanied his father. Later, he also participated in Ieyasu's campaign during the siege of Ōdaka Castle which occurred before the Battle of Okehazama.

In 1561, It was said that when he was aged just 14 years old, Tadakatsu recorded his first kill in battle. At first his uncle, Honda Tadazane, killed an enemy samurai and asked Tadakatsu to cut off the corpse head as trophy for Tadakatsu. However, Tadakatsu stated that he did not want to rely on others to achieve military merit. Tadakatsu followed suit by charging towards the enemy rank and made his own trophy by killing an enemy by his own hand.

Tadakatsu, who became the head of the core branch of Honda clan, was at first a follower of Jōdo Shinshū (True pure land Buddhism). However, as radical sectarian rebels of Ikkō-ikki which following Jōdo Shinshū broke out, Tadakatsu abandoned Jōdo Shinshū and changing his faith to Jōdo-shū(pure land Buddhism), as he stayed loyal to Ieyasu. Tadakatsu joined Ina Tadatsugu, Sakai Tadatsugu, Mizuno Sanzaemon, Torii Mototada, Ōkubo Tadakatsu, and Ishikawa Tadanari to support Ieyasu in suppression of Ikkō-ikki.

Around 1561-1563, The Ietada nikki journal has stated at some point of this rebellion, 200 Tokugawa soldiers led by Tadakatsu and Ishikawa Ienari were ambushed and routed by Ikkō-ikki rebels led by Sakai Tadanao.

In June 1564, Tadakatsu competed with Hachiya Sadatsugu (Note: Hachiya Hannojō Sadatsugu was a relative of Ōkubo clan and former follower of Ikkō-ikki sect led by Kōsa who rebelled against Samurai daimyo in Mikawa. Sadatsugu later pardoned by Tokugawa Ieyasu.) to be appointed as vanguard commander to attack Yoshida Castle. In the end, Tadakatsu was chosen to lead the troops and they managed to defeat the garrison and forced the castle to surrender. However, Sadatsugu was killed during the battle by the enemy commander Masanori Kawai. In 1566, at the age of 19, Tadakatsu was promoted Hatamoto and was given command of 54 cavalry soldiers.

=== Campaign against Asakura-Azai alliance ===
in 1570, Tadakatsu gained distinction at the Battle of Anegawa against Azai and Asakura clans along with Tokugawa's ally, Oda Nobunaga. In this battle, Tadakatsu was placed in the left flank along with Ōkubo Tadayo. It was recorded that at the beginning of this battle, as the Tokugawa army steadily pushed back by the Asakura army, Tadakatsu suddenly rode his horse charging alone against the approaching 10,000-strong Asakura army. Seeing this, the panicked Ieyasu immediately leading his forces to counter the advance of Asakura and to save Tadakatsu, which in the end they manage to defeat the Asakura army. Tadakatsu survived the battle despite the grave danger he faced.

There is also a report of single combat between Honda Tadakatsu against a giant Asakura warrior named Magara Naotaka or also known as Magara Jurozaemon. However, The duel was cut short as during their duel, the Asakura army started to retreat. (Note: Daimon Watanabe, professor of Bukkyo University, and director of Japan institute of arts and culture stated the historical primary sources about the duel between Tadakatsu and Naotaka were very few and scarce.)

After the Tokugawa forces finished dealing with Asakura forces, they immediately dispatched Yasumasa and Honda Tadakatsu troops to assist Oda Nobunaga who were struggling against the Azai army. As Yasumasa and Tadakatsu struck the right flank of Azai Nagamasa's formation in subsequent with Inaba Yoshimichi slammed into Nagamasa's left flank, they finally managed to overcame the Azai army.

=== Campaign against Takeda clan ===
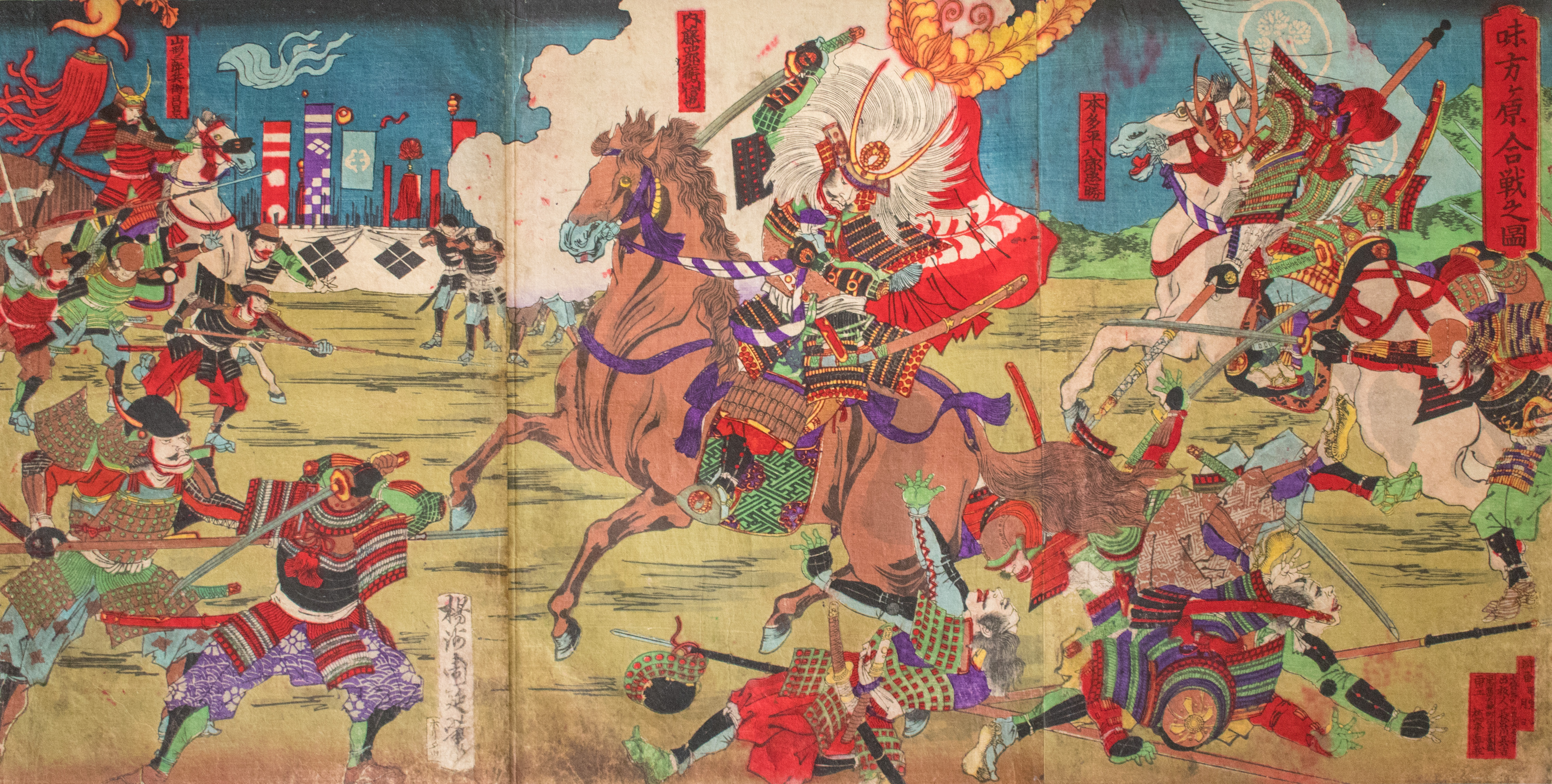
“Illustration of the Battle of Hitokotosaka” by Shunobu: Naitō Nobunari in the center, Honda Tadakatsu on the right

In 1572, during the Takeda clan campaign in Mikawa, Tadakatsu participated in the forces of Tokugawa. Ieyasu sent him, Naitō Nobunari, and Ōkubo Tadasuke, to lead the vanguard, where they meet Takeda forces led by Yamagata Masakage and Baba Nobuharu at the battle of Hitokotosaka. It is said that in this battle Tadakatsu gained recognition from the enemy forces for his antler helmet and his Tonbo-giri spear for his exploit in staving off the charges of Baba Nobuharu’s units. In the end of this battle, Tadakatsu and Naitō Nobunari fought well, as both of them managed to break through from the encirclement attempts by Takeda forces and managed to lead the Tokugawa forces to escape safely.

In 1573, Tadakatsu also served at Tokugawa's greatest defeat, the Battle of Mikatagahara, where he commanded the left wing of his master's army, facing off against troops under one of the Takeda clan's more notable generals, Naitō Masatoyo. In the prelude of the battle, Tadakatsu managed to ward off the first wave, however, the Tokugawa forces were getting overrun by the next waves of Takeda forces. In the last phase of the battle, Tadakatsu reportedly fought alongside Sakakibara Yasumasa engaging a Takeda clan general named Oyamada Masayuki, while Ishikawa Kazumasa was busy covering the retreat of Ieyasu from the battle. In the end, the Tokugawa forces managed to withdraw safely from the battle due to the dexterous performance of Tadakatsu in organizing the cover of their retreat.

Later in the same year, Tadakatsu and Sakakibara Yasumasa were tasked to capture Nagashino Castle. Both of them managed to defeat the Takeda clan armies which guarded the castle and completed their mission to capture it. Aside from that, Tadakatsu also captured many other castles in Tōtōmi Province from Takeda clan.

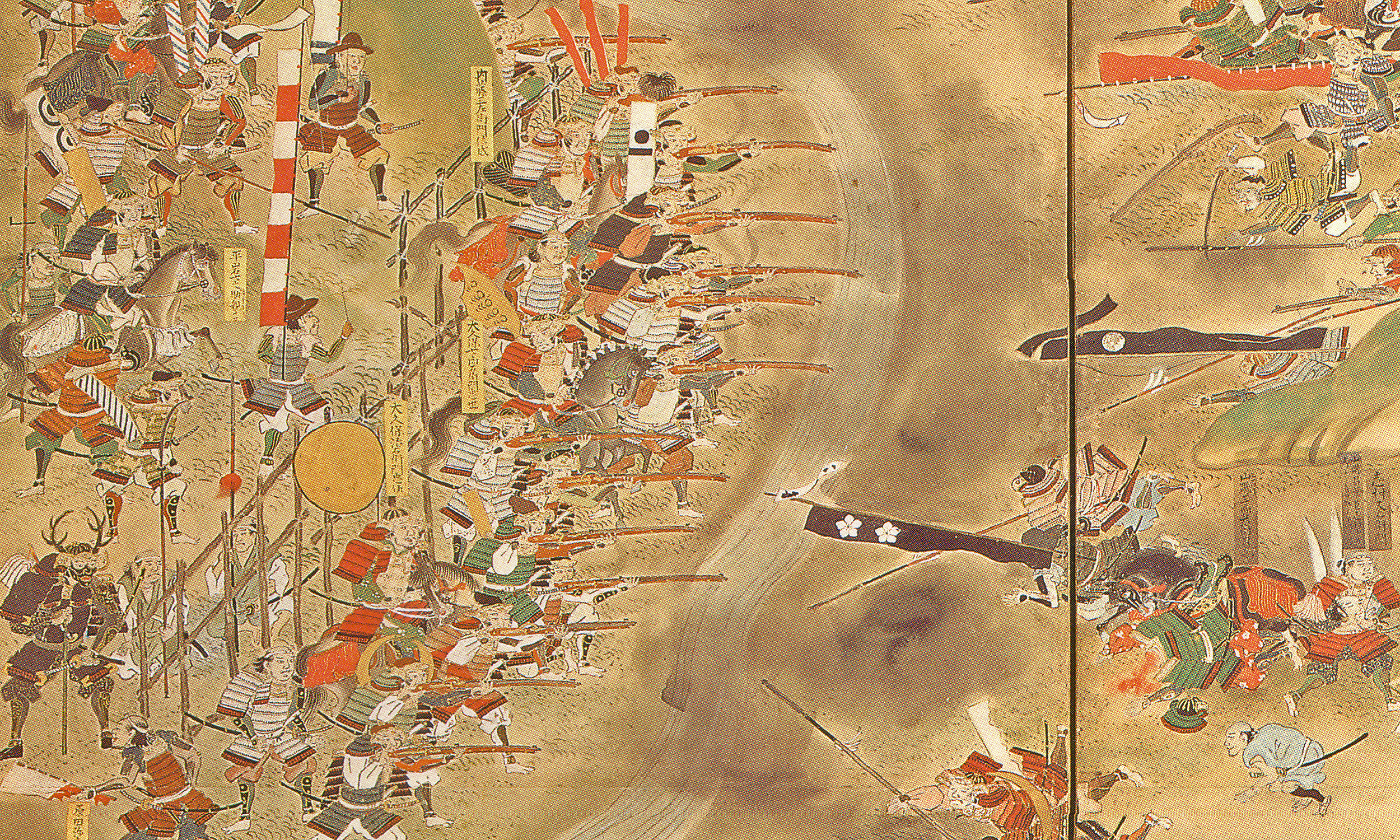
Folding screen depicting the Battle of Nagashino, with Honda Tadakatsu on the far bottom-left

In 1575, during the conflict between the Oda-Tokugawa alliance against Takeda Katsuyori, heir of Shingen, when the latter invaded Enshū province, Tadakatsu and Sakakibara fought under the Tokugawa forces against Katsuyori, where they captured Komyo castle in June. Later in the same month, Tadakatsu was one of the Tokugawa generals present at the Battle of Nagashino in 1575. Honda commanded a rank of musketeers as the combined Oda-Tokugawa forces annihilated Takeda Katsuyori's army, due to the skillful use of ranked muskets, as they fired in cycling volleys. In this battle, units under Tadakatsu were facing against Yamagata Masakage, who was killed on his track by a shot from Tadakatsu's musketeers. At some point in this battle, 1,500 Takeda soldiers under Naitō Masatoyo managed to break through with 24 men able to climb the third fence to the defensive position of the Oda-Tokugawa forces. Masatoyo was said to almost reach Ieyasu's main camp, until Tadakatsu, Sakakibara Yasumasa, and Osuga Yasutaka came in to block his way. One source recorded that Tadakatsu took his spear and personally engaged Masatoyo's soldiers on the frontline, preventing them from encroaching further. (Note: Honda clan's records.) Tadakatsu fought hard until the Masatoyo's corps were annihilated, while Masatoyo himself was captured. The Kansei Chōshū Shokafu chronicle has recorded that in the final phase of the battle, Tadakatsu fought ferociously until the Takeda forces were routed, while a retainer of Honda clan named Kaji Masamichi managed to take the heads of Yamagata Masakage and Baba Nobuharu as a prize. Immediately after the Nagashino battle, Tadakatsu and Sakakibara Yasumasa attacked and captured the Suwahara Castle.

In 1581, Tadakatsu participated in the Tokugawa army attack on Tanaka Castle which was guarded by a Takeda clan general named Ichijō Nobutatsu. In this battle, Tadakatsu fought together with Matsudaira Ietada, Sakakibara Yasumasa, and Ii Naomasa as they all climbed the Tanaka castle wall engaging Nobutatsu's soldiers. Later during the Siege of Takatenjin, Tokugawa forces under Tadakatsu and others stormed the castle and managed to kill a Takeda general named Okabe Motonobu. Later in the same year, Tadakatsu also defeated the army of Takeda Nobukado.

Later, in March of same year, According to Meishō genkō-roku record, After the death of Takeda Katsuyori at the Battle of Tenmokuzan in 1582 and subjugated the Takeda clan territories, Ieyasu organized a kishōmon (blood oath) with many samurai clans that formerly was a vassal of Takeda clan to be assigned under the command of Tokugawa clan retainers. Among those who has assigned the commands of the former Takeda samurai was Honda Tadakatsu, who received a command over 60 members of Asari clan led by Asari Masatane.

=== After Nobunaga's death ===
In 1582, after the Honnō-ji Incident, Tadakatsu accompanied Ieyasu in an arduous journey to escape the enemies of Nobunaga in Sakai and returning to Mikawa. However, their journey was very dangerous due to the existence of "Ochimusha-gari" groups across the route. (Note: According to Imatani Akira, professor of Tsuru University, and Ishikawa Tadashi, assistant professor University of Central Florida, during Sengoku period there are emergence of particularly dangerous groups called "Ochimusha-gari" or "fallen warrior hunt" groups. these groups were decentralized peasant or Rōnin self-defense forces who operates outside the law, while in actuality they often resorted to hunt Samurais or soldiers who has been defeated in wars.) During this journey, Tadakatsu and other senior Ieyasu retainers such as Sakai Tadatsugu and Ii Naomasa fought their way out against the raids and harassments from Ochimusha-gari outlaws (Samurai hunters) during their march escorting Ieyasu, while sometimes also paying bribes of gold and silver to the Ochimusha-gari gangs which they could bribe. Arthur Lindsay Sadler said that Tadakatsu was "repelling the bandits" often during this journey. As they reached Kada, an area between Kameyama town and Iga, the attacks from Ochimusha-gari finally ended as they reached the territory of Kōka ikki clans of Jizamurai who were friendly to the Tokugawa clan. The Koka ikki samurai were helping them killing members of the Ochimusha-gari and then escorting them until they reached Iga Province, where they were further protected by samurai clans from Iga ikki which accompany the Ieyasu group until they safely reached Mikawa. The Ietada nikki journal has recorded that the escorts of Ieyasu has suffered around 200 casualties and only 34 person left when they finally arrived at Ietada residence in Mikawa.

In 1584, Tadakatsu participated in the Komaki Campaign of Tokugawa against Toyotomi Hideyoshi. During this conflict, Tadakatsu entered negotiation with the Akai clan, a samurai clan from Tanba Province, which led by Ashida Tokinao, younger brother of Akai Naomasa, as Tokinao aspired for the revival of the Akai clan by contributing with Tokugawa clan. (Note: A letter from Honda Tadakatsu dated May 16 addressed to Ashida Yahyoe-no-jo (Akai Tokinao) reads, "The son of Akuu-u (Akai Naomasa) has been taken into custody.") Tokinao then raised an army in Tanba on Ieyasu's side. As Tadakatsu was stationed Komaki while Ieyasu departed to engage Toyotomi troops at Nagakute, Tadakatsu observed a huge host under Hideyoshi himself move out in pursuit. With a handful of men, Tadakatsu rode out and challenged the Toyotomi army from the opposite bank of the Shōnai River. Toyotomi Hideyoshi was said to have been impressed by Tadakatsu and commanded his army to not attack the small units of Tadakatsu. After the Battle of Komaki and Nagakute, the front line in northern Owari reached stalemate. Ieyasu and Oda Nobukatsu led 20,000 soldiers and besieged three castles: Kanie Castle, Maeda Castle, and Shimoichiba Castle. The Kanie castle were defended by Maeda Nagatane and Takigawa Kazumasu. Tadatsugu, Okanabe Mori, and Yamaguchi Shigemasa spearheading the attack towards Shimoichiba castle. On June 22, Nobukatsu and Ieyasu launch an all-out attack on Kanie Castle. The soldiers led by Tadatsugu, While Tadakatsu, Ishikawa Kazumasa, Ii Naomasa, Sakakibara Yasumasa, and Matsudaira Ietada deployed in reserve before entering the battle with Ieyasu himself. On June 23, Ieyasu entered the castle with Sakakibara Yasumasa, thus the castle were subdued.

=== Famed Four Tokugawa's Guardians under Toyotomi Regency ===
on November 13, 1585, Ishikawa Kazumasa defected from Ieyasu to Hideyoshi. This accident caused Ieyasu to undergone massive reforms of the structures of Tokugawa clan military government. At first, Ieyasu ordered Torii Mototada, who served as the county magistrate of Kai, to collect military laws, weapons, and military equipment from the time of Takeda Shingen and bring them to Hamamatsu Castle (Hamamatsu City, Shizuoka Prefecture). Later, he also appointed two former Takeda vassals, Naruse Masakazu and Okabe Masatsuna, as magistrates under authority of Ii Naomasa and Honda Tadakatsu, while he also ordered all of former Takeda vassals who now serve him to impart any military doctrines and structures they knew during their service under Takeda clan, and lastly, he ordered the three of his prime generals, the so-called "Tokugawa Four Heavenly Kings," Ii Naomasa, Honda Tadakatsu, and Sakakibara Yasumasa, to serve as supreme commander of this new military regiments.

In 1586, according to "Sakakibara clan historical records", Ieyasu sent Tadakatsu, Sakakibara Yasumasa and Ii Naomasa as representatives to Kyoto, where three of them being regarded as "Tokugawa Sanketsu"(Three great nobles of Tokugawa). Then in following month, the three of them joined by Sakai Tadatsugu to accompany Ieyasu in his personal trip to Kyoto, where the four of them became famous as "Four Tokugawa Guardians". (Note: However, Murayama did not mention the sobriquet of "Four Guardians" here. He only mention that those four Tokugawa generals "became famous) Tadakatsu also rewarded with several ranks promotion here. In 1590, Tokugawa Ieyasu participated in Hideyoshi Toyotomi campaign against Hōjō clan and sent Tadakatsu, Torii Mototada, Hiraiwa Chikayoshi, and his other vassals to command the Tokugawa army to subdue various branches of castles controlled by the Hōjō clan. Tadakatsu and Sakai Ietsugu captured Sakura Castle and fought against the Chiba clan, allies of the Hōjō in Shimōsa Province. Tadakatsu besieged Tamanawa Castle which defended by Hōjō Ujikatsu, until it fallen in April 21 and forcing Ujikatsu to abandon the castle. In May 19, Tadakatsu, Torii Mototada, Hiraiwa Chikayoshi, and Kawakubo Nobutoshi, joined with Asano Nagamasa and Shigeka, forming 20,000 strong advance troops besieging Iwatsuki Castle. The forces of Honda clan under Tadakatsu's vassal, Kaji Masamichi, entered the castle and then go up to the top floor, where Masamichi raised a black flag to the outside to signalling their allies to follow suit entering the castle. Iwatsuki castle has fallen in May 22. In May 14, Tokugawa troops detachment under Tadakatsu, Shimada Toshimasa, and Torii Mototada were attaching themselves to the Toyotomi army besieging Hachigata Castle, with total strength of 35,000. On June 13, When Tadakatsu was deployed under Asano Nagamasa, he carried a cannon up a nearby mountain and began firing it into the castle, which causing severe damage to the castle, prompting its defender, Ujikuni, surrendered the castle in exchange for sparing the lives of the castle's soldiers. the castle fallen in June 14. During this campaign, Tadakatsu also subdued Mangi Castle, which he temporarily settled in. (Note: The kanji of Mangi castle could be written either 万木城 or 万喜城 (Mangi-jō))

Later in the same year, when Ieyasu was transferred to the Kantō region, Ieyasu promoted him from daimyō/lord of the Ōtaki Domain (100000 koku) in Isumi District, Kazusa Province, to the Kuwana Domain (150000 koku) as a reward for his service. In addition, his son Honda Tadatomo became daimyo of Ōtaki. It was said the reason why Ieyasu placed Tadakatsu far from Edo was due to Ieyasu's policy of placing his Fudai daimyō on the borders in anticipation of potential enemy invasion. Yasumasa was preparing against the Sanada clan and Uesugi clan in the north, while Tadakatsu was prepared to anticipate potential aggression from the Satomi clan in Awa Province.

In 1591, after one year settling in Mangi castle, Tadakatsu move into Otaki Castle. Later, Ieyasu Tokugawa brought Tadakatsu, Sakakibara Yasumasa, and Ii Naomasa to participate in the suppression of Kunohe rebellion.

=== Sekigahara campaign ===
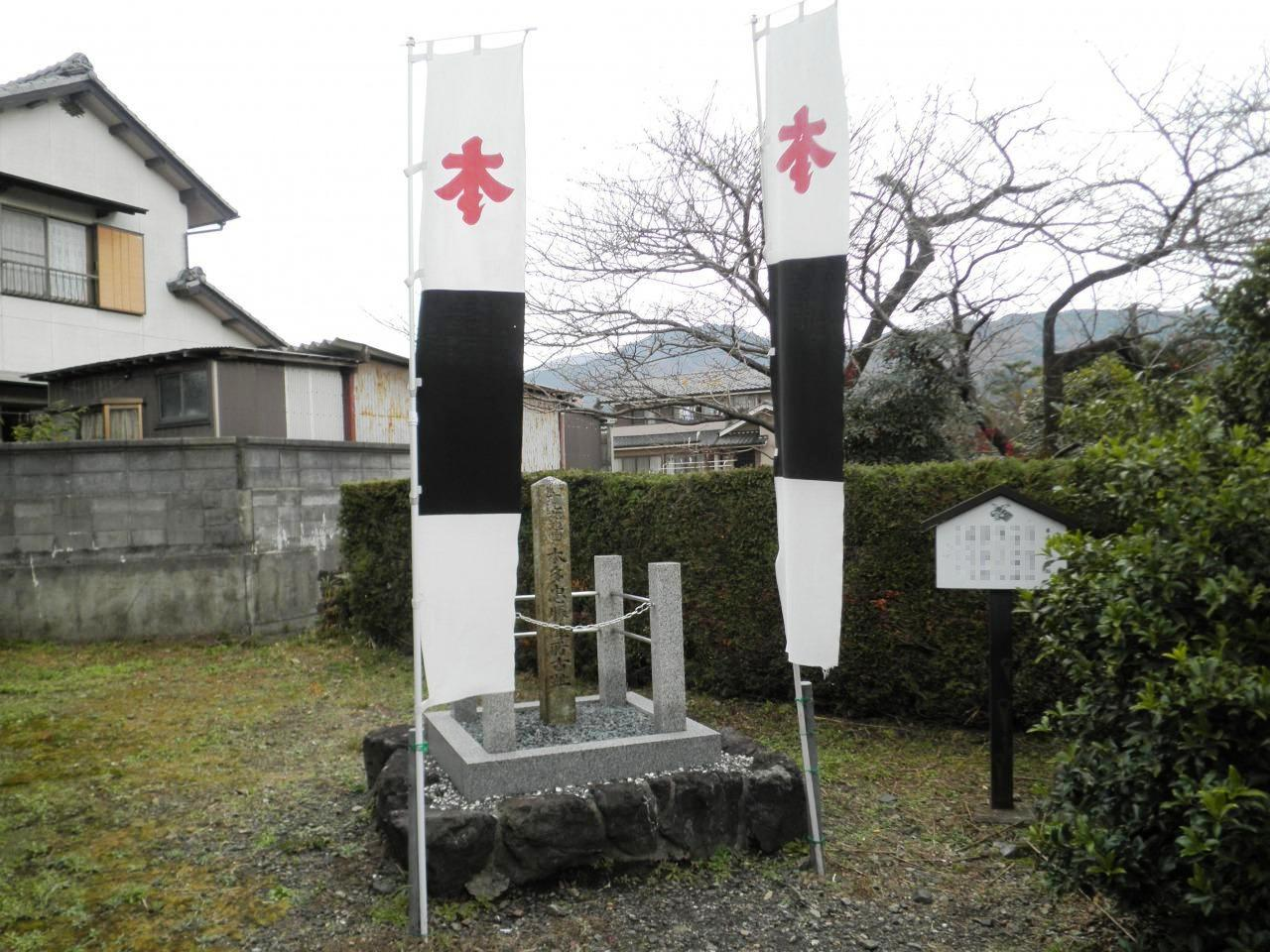
Tadakatsu's position in the Battle of Sekigahara.

In 1600, Tadakatsu had a major role in the Tokugawa campaign against Ishida Mitsunari faction. Before the start of the conflict, Tadakatsu also played diplomatic role as he entered negotiation with Katō Sadayasu, daimyo of Hōki Province, and swayed him to side with Tokugawa faction.

On August 21, The Eastern army alliance which sided with Ieyasu Tokugawa attacked Takegahana castle which defended by Oda Hidenobu, who sides with Mitsunari faction. They split themselves into two groups, where 18,000 soldiers led by Ikeda Terumasa and Asano Yoshinaga went to the river crossing, while 16,000 soldiers led by Naomasa, Fukushima Masanori, Hosokawa Tadaoki, Kyogoku Kochi, Kuroda Nagamasa, Katō Yoshiaki, Tōdō Takatora, Tanaka Yoshimasa, and Honda Tadakatsu went downstream at Ichinomiya. The first group led by Terumasa crossed the Kiso River and engaged in a battle at Yoneno, causing the Hidenobu army routed. On the other hand, Takegahana castle were reinforced by a Western army faction's general named Sugiura Shigekatsu. The Eastern army led by Naomasa and Fukushima crossed the river and directly attacked Takegahana Castle at 9:00 AM on the August 22nd. Shigekatsu himself setting the castle on fire and committed suicide as a final act of defiance.

On September 29, Tadakatsu and Masanori led their army to rendezvous with Ikeda Terumasa army, where they engaged Oda Hidenobu army in the Battle of Gifu Castle. crossing a river near Hagiwara and Ogoe town, and approached the Gifu Castle with total 35,000 soldiers. In this battle, Hidenobu castle were deprived the expected support from Ishikawa Sadakiyo (石川貞清), who decided to not help the Western army in this war after he made an agreement with Naomasa. Hidenobu was prepared to commit seppuku, but was persuaded by Ikeda Terumasa and others to surrender to the eastern forces, and the Gifu Castle fell.

In October, Tadakatsu participated in the Battle of Kuisegawa. At first, two Tokugawa generals Nakamura Kazuhide and Arima Toyouji fell into a trap of ambush from the flanks as they were pursuing the fleeing Western Army officers Shima Sakon and Akashi Teruzumi. However, the timely intervention of Tadakatsu gave space for Kazuhide and Toyouji to escape from Sakon aggression, and Tadakatsu managed to halt the western army from pursuing his comrades.

Later, Honda Tadakatsu participated at the Battle of Sekigahara as one of the Eastern army commanders. At some point during this battle, Tadakatsu rode his horse, "Mikuni-Guro", to penetrate the ranks of the camps of Shimazu Yoshihiro and Ukita Hideie, two of the Western Army's commanders. However, Tadakatsu's beloved horse Mikuni-Guro was shot (or, according to one theory, hit by an arrow) during this moment, forcing Tadakatsu to desperately fight in the middle of the enemy soldiers' encirclement, until his senior vassal, Katsutada Kaji, came to his rescue, and offered his horse to Tadakatsu, who was still being surrounded by the enemies. Ōta Gyūichi chronicles of Daifu-Kō gunki has recorded, after several western army generals such as Ōtani Yoshitsugu and Shima Sakon along with his son were slain in the battle, Tadakatsu units surging forward against the Western Army unimpeded until reaching Nakasuji, causing the Western Army to be routed, and flee down to the Tamafuji River.

After the victory of Ieyasu forces in Sekigahara, Ieyasu rewarded Tadakatsu with domain increase of 150,000 koku. However, Tadakatsu refused this promotion, so Ieyasu instead assigned reward of 50,000 to Tadakatsu's son instead. Tadakatsu and Ii Naomasa engaged in peace agreement with Mōri Terumoto. Itazaka Bokusai (1578－1655), personal physician of Tokugawa Ieyasu, has recorded a memorial from anonymous soldier from Sekigahara in his work, "Keichō Chronicle", that after Ishida Mitsunari was caught and brought in to be executed, Tadakatsu came close while bowed politely towards Mitsunari, and saying "Lord Mitsunari has made a mistake".

=== Retirement & death ===
In 1609, Tadakatsu retired, and his other son, Tadamasa, took over the position of the head of Honda clan. Knowing that he was nearing the end of his life, Honda Tadakatsu died peacefully in his sleep in December, 1610. Tadakatsu's daughter, Komatsuhime was Sanada Nobuyuki's lawful wife and mother of Sanada Nobumasa, daimyō of Matsushiro Domain. His grandson, Tadatoki, married the granddaughter of Tokugawa Ieyasu, Senhime. Despite his years of loyal service, Tadakatsu became increasingly estranged from the Tokugawa shogunate (Bakufu government) as it evolved from a military to a civilian political institution. This was a fate shared by many other warriors of the time, who were not able to make the conversion from the chaotic lifetime of warfare of the Sengoku period to the more stable peace of the Tokugawa shogunate.

== Personal information ==
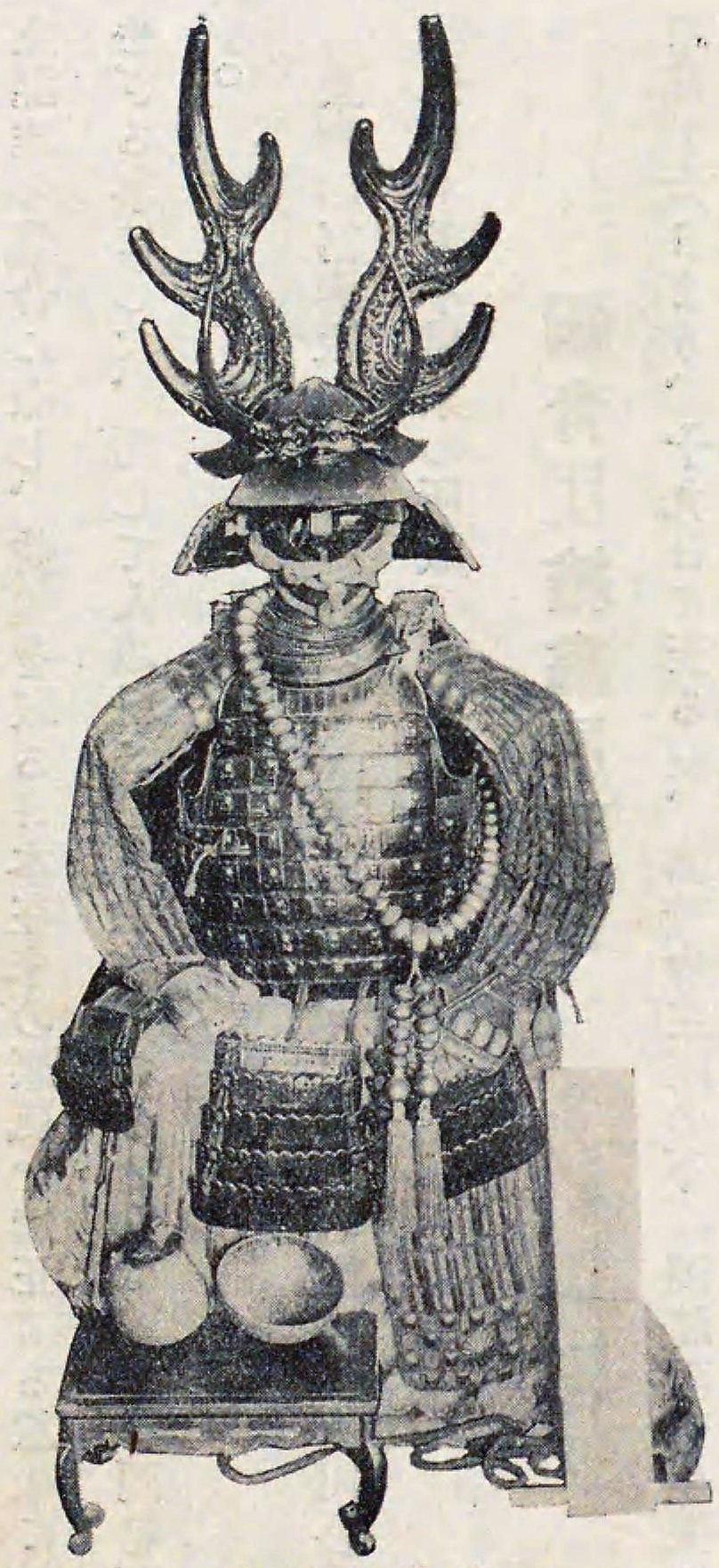
Armor of Honda Tadakatsu, an Important Cultural Property of Japan, private collection, Iyeyasu and Mikawa Bushi Museum, Okazaki, Aichi prefecture

Tadakatsu's reputation gained praise from Oda Nobunaga, who praised him, called him a "samurai among samurai". Moreover, Toyotomi Hideyoshi noted that the best samurai were "Honda Tadakatsu in the east and Tachibana Muneshige in the west". Even Takeda Shingen praised Honda, saying that "he is a luxury of Tokugawa Ieyasu". It was widely acknowledged that he was a reputed samurai, war hero and a loyal retainer of Tokugawa Ieyasu.

Tadakatsu is nicknamed as "The Warrior who surpassed Death itself" because he never once suffered a significant wound, despite being the veteran of over 57 battles by the end of his life. An anecdote recorded by Japanese writer Kusudo Yoshiaki has stated that Honda Tadakatsu always contrasted with another Tokugawa general Ii Naomasa, where despite being lightly armored, Tadakatsu never received any injury during his life, while Naomasa received wounds in every battle despite being heavily armored.

There is anecdote in a record from a descendant of Sakakibara clan, that stated despite Tadakatsu exceeding Sakakibara Yasumasa in terms of valor and combat, Yasumasa is better than Tadakatsu in the field leadership skill.

Another anecdote about Tadakatsu's physical strength stated he could slice a bamboo in a single slash reed using a wooden oar instead of a metal blade.

The armor set used by Honda Tadakatsu has unique style of two-piece body with iron hinges. It has a large white Japamala rosary hung across the shoulder to the armpit of the armor. The helmet is black lacquer with large deer antler shaped Wakidate (Crests fitted to the sides of a helmet). This armour is fully coated in black lacquer.

His horse was known as Mikuniguro.

=== Tonbokiri spear ===
His spear was named Tonbokiri (Dragonfly Cutter), was made by Fujiwara Masazane. It became known as one of the "Three Great Spears of Japan". As the modern era preserved, It has 79 centimeters in length. According to historical records, the shaft of Tonbokiri was 6 meters (19 ft 8 in) in length. However, according to the record of Honda Tadakatsu himself, he purposely shortened the length by 1 meter after he reached advanced age to match his physical demand for carrying such weapons, unlike when he was still young.

From the bottom of the shaft, the Tonbokiri has inscriptions of Kaman of Fudo Myoo, the evil-destroying sword Sankoken, the Sa (Sanskrit) of Sho Kannon Bodhisattva, the Kiriku of Amida Tathagata, and Jizo. Each one is engraved with the ka (Sanskrit character) for Bodhisattva.

Legend held that the tip of the spear was so sharp, that a dragonfly that landed on it was cut in two.

=== Nakatsukasa sword ===
Tadakatsu used the katana - Nakatsukasaa made by Masamune (中務正宗), Nakatsukasa Masamune (中務正宗)^{#} a 67 cm blade, a object which is considered to be a national treasure of Japan.

| Preceded by none | Daimyō of Ōtaki; 1590–1601 | Succeeded by Honda Tadatomo |
| Preceded by none | Daimyō of Kuwana; 1601–1609 | Succeeded by Honda Tadamasa |

== Popular culture ==
A Japanese historical drama NHK show What Will You Do, Ieyasu? (どうする家康, Dousuru Ieyasu; What Would You Do, Ieyasu?,) has actor Yuki Yamada played the role as Honda Tadakatsu.

In theater and other contemporary works, Tadakatsu is often characterized as polar opposite of Ieyasu's other great general, Ii Naomasa. While both were fierce warriors of the Tokugawa, Tadakatsu's ability to elude injury is often contrasted with the common depiction of Naomasa enduring many battle wounds, but fighting through them.

Honda Tadakatsu appears in numerous Japanese jidaigeki (historical dramas for television) set in the 16th century. He is a minor character in Akira Kurosawa's movie Kagemusha.

Honda Tadakatsu, or fictive characters based loosely on the historical figure, appears in several video games and associated anime, including the Sengoku Basara games and anime, Samurai Warriors, Warriors Orochi, Nioh 2, Nioh 3, Pokémon Conquest, and Kessen.

Honda appears as a playable character in the Mobile/PC Game titled Rise of Kingdoms.

== Appendix ==
=== Bibliography ===
- Akira Imatani (1993). 天皇と天下人. 新人物往来社. ISBN 4404020732. "Akira Imatani"Practice of attacking fallen warriors"; 2000; p.153 chapter 4"
- Fukushima, Katsuhiko (2017). "天正十二年小牧・長久手合戦と丹波国衆" [The Battle of Komaki and Nagakute in 1581 and the Tanba Kokushu]. 丹波 (19): 16–32.
- Fukushima, Katsuhiko (2023). "荻野直正（赤井直正）―明智光秀の前に立ちはだかった"名高キ武士" / Ogino Naomasa (Akai Naomasa) - The "famous warrior" who stood in the way of Akechi Mitsuhide". In Amano, Tadayuki (ed.). 戦国武将列伝8 畿内編 下 [Sengoku Warlords' Biographies 8: Kinai Volume 2]. 戎光祥出版. pp. 159–168. ISBN 978-4-86403-447-0.
- Hotta Masaatsu (1923), Kansei Choshu family records; Volume 564 (in Japanese), 國民圖書, p. 1073
- "Tadakatsu Honda". Kuwana-city Tourist guide. Kuwana-City.
- Arthur Lindsay Sadler (2014). The Maker of Modern Japan The Life of Tokugawa Ieyasu. Taylor & Francis. ISBN 9781136924705.
- Tanaka, Kaoru (2007). 松本藩. シリーズ藩物語. 現代書館. ISBN 978-4-7684-7108-1.
- Carol Richmond Tsang (2020). War and Faith Ikkō Ikki in Late Muromachi Japan. Brill. pp. 215, 219, 303. ISBN 9781684174577.
- Stephen Turnbull (2012). Tokugawa Ieyasu. Bloomsbury Publishing. pp. 13, 27, 34. ISBN 9781849085755.
- Stephen Turnbull (2013). The Samurai A Military History. Taylor & Francis. pp. 162–3. ISBN 9781134243693.
