= Mōri Katsunaga =

Mōri Katsunaga (毛利 勝永; 1577 – June 4, 1615) or Mōri Yoshimasa was an officer for the Toyotomi clan following the sixteenth-century Azuchi-Momoyama period through the early years of the seventeenth-century Edo period in Japan.

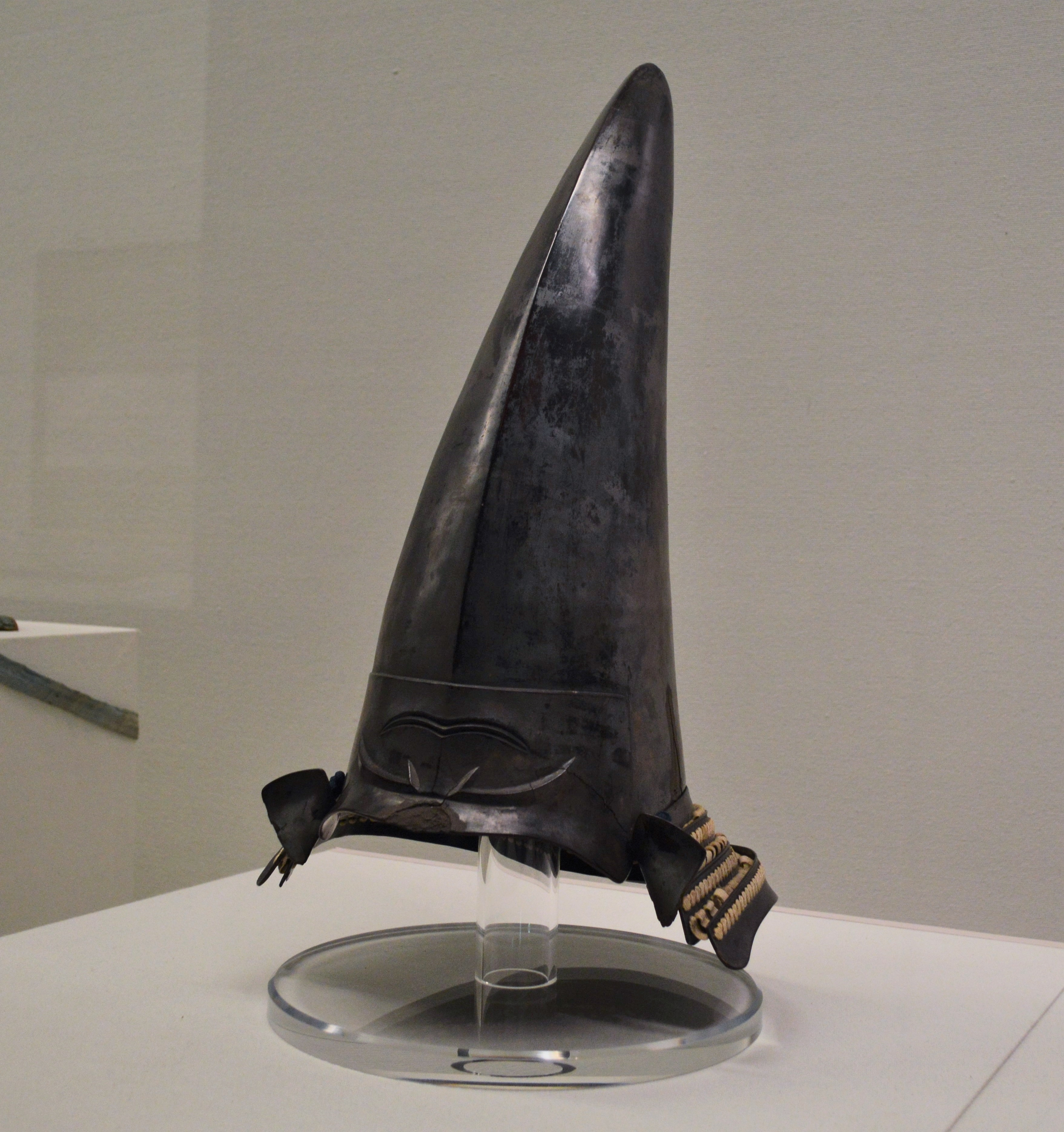
White-laced buffalo helmet (said to have been worn by Mori Katsunaga during the Battle of Osaka. On display at the Kochi Castle History Museum, Kochi Prefecture.)

Katsunaga fought in the Japanese invasions of Korea (1592–1598), and in the Battle of Sekigahara he joined the western legion but was defeated. Later, during the Siege of Osaka, Katsunaga, by tricking a guard, infiltrated Osaka castle. He defeated Honda Tadatomo (an officer for the Tokugawa) there in the summer.
