= Honda Tadatomo =

Daimyo in the early Edo period; lord of Otaki

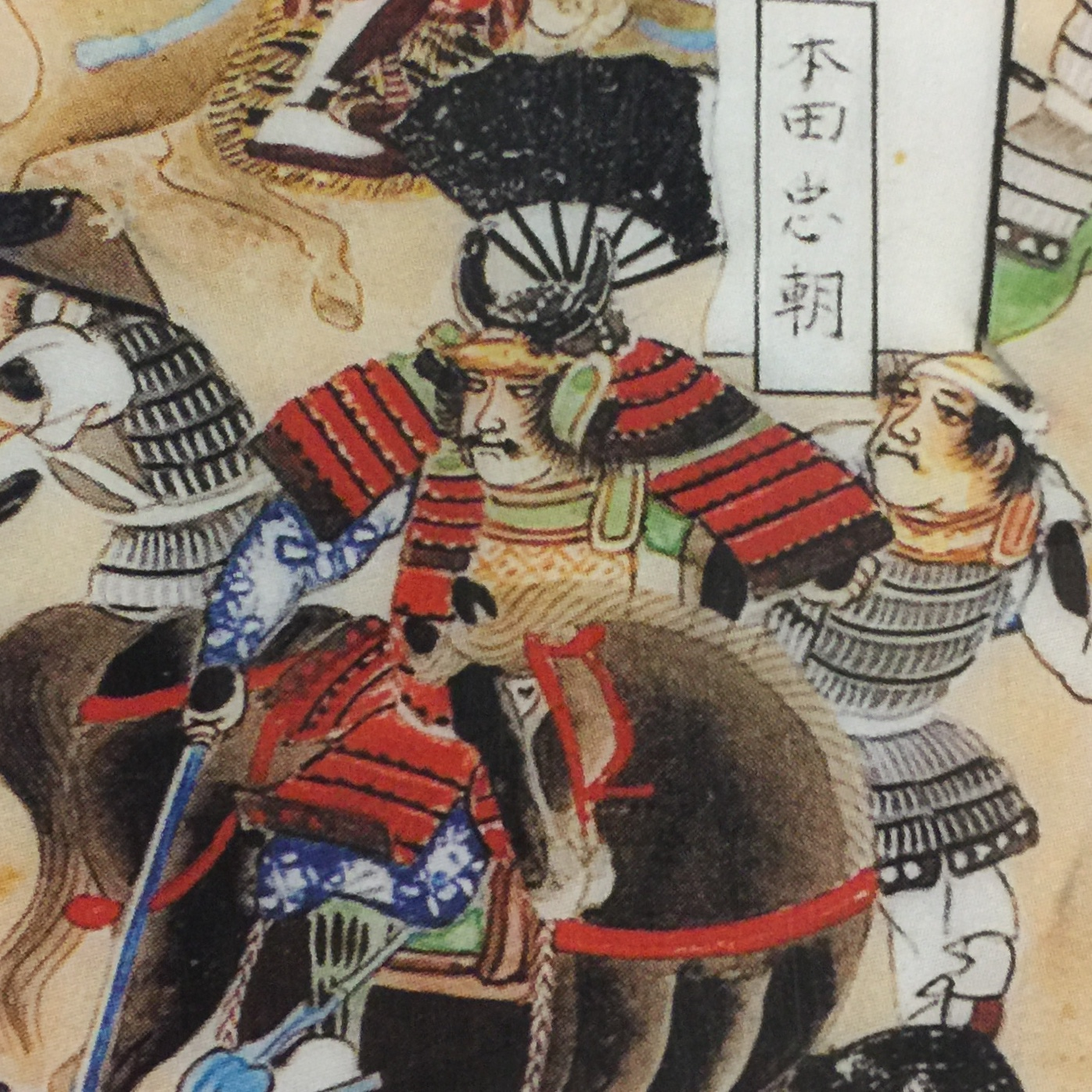
Honda Tadatomo

Honda Tadatomo (本多 忠朝; 1582 – June 3, 1615) was a Japanese samurai lord who was a retainer of the Tokugawa clan following the Azuchi–Momoyama period of the 16th century to the Edo period of the 17th century of Japan. Tadatomo was the younger son of Honda Tadakatsu, one of Four Guardians of the Tokugawa.

== Life ==
Tadatomo received a 100,000-koku domain at Ōtaki in Kazusa Province following the year 1600. In the year 1609, Tadatomo sheltered Don Rodrigo, who was the Spanish Governor of Philippines.

During the winter campaign of Siege of Osaka, Tadatomo fought well and made a lot of contributions. However, he was defeated in a battle because of getting drunk. He was scolded by Tokugawa Ieyasu after the defeat for this mistake. This incident however changed the fate of Tadatomo. In the next year, 1615, Tadatomo fought very valiantly during the Battle of Tennōji, one of the final battles of the summer campaign of Siege of Osaka, to regain his honor by clearing his shame during the winter campaign. He led an attack that led to the death of Mōri Katsunaga. Tadatomo himself did not survive the battle. He died at the age of 34.

Before his death, Tadatomo was said to be regret making critical mistakes caused by his drinking habit. His final words include "I shall help those who drink" (酒のために身をあやまる者を救おう) and "What I should have done was to quit drinking. Those who visit my tomb, must obtain the hate of alcohol, and quit drinking." (戒むべきは酒なり、今後わが墓に詣でる者は、必ず酒嫌いとなるべし) Since his death, Tadatomo is known as the "God of alcohol quitting" among the public. In Japan, a lot of people who wish to quit drinking, or those who wish their family will quit drinking, visits Tadatomo's tomb and pray.

== Tomb ==
Tadatomo's tomb is inside Isshin-ji, a Pure Land Buddhist temple located very close to the camp of the Tokugawa army during the Siege of Osaka.
