= Ōdaka Castle =

- 大高城
- Midori-ku, Nagoya, Aichi, Japan
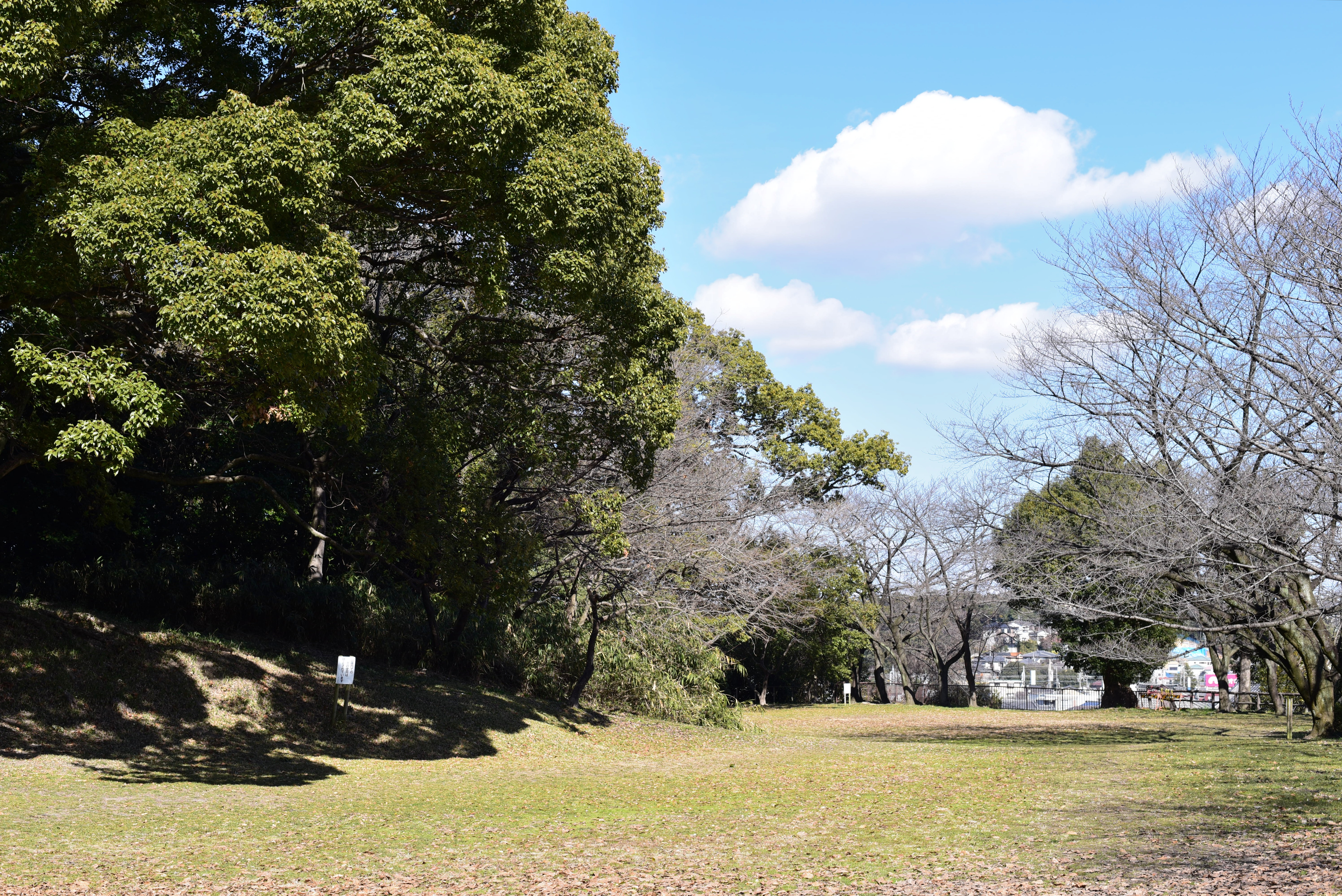
- Ruins of Ōdaka Castle

Site information
- Type: hirajiro-style Japanese castle
- Open to the public: park
- Condition: Ruins

Location
- Ōdaka Castle Ōdaka Castle (Japan)
- Coordinates: 35°04′10″N 136°56′33″E

Site history
- Built: Muromachi period
- In use: Sengoku period

Ōdaka Castle (大高城, Ōdaka-jō) was a Sengoku period flatland-style Japanese castle located in what is now part of Midori Ward of the city of Nagoya, Aichi in the Tōkai region of Japan. The ruins, together with that of the detached fortresses of Marune-toride (丸根砦跡) and Washizu-toride (鷲津砦跡) have been collectively protected as a National Historic Site since 1944.

== Background ==
It is not known when Ōdaka Castle was built, but records indicate that Toki Yoriyasu (1318-1388), the Nanboku-chō period shugo of Owari Province made Ikeda Yoritada castellan of Ōdaka, so the castle dates to at least this time. It was later held by the Mizuno clan, but in the Tenbun era (1532-1555), the castle was controlled by Oda Nobuhide. In 1548, it was unsuccessfully attacked by the forces of Imagawa Yoshimoto. However, after Oda Nobuhide's death, it fell into Imagawa hands with the defection of Yamaguchi Noritsugu together with Narumi Castle and Kitsukake Castle, as Yamaguchi despised Nobuhide's son, Oda Nobunaga. Nobunaga responded by construction of the fortresses of Marune and Washizu in 1559, and the Imagawa responded by installing Udono Nagateru as castellan of Ōdaka. Matsudaira Motoyasu (later known as Tokugawa Ieyasu) was sent by Imagawa Yoshimoto to assist Udono Nagateru at Ōdaka, but upon hearing word of Imagawa Yoshimoto's death at the Battle of Okehazama turned instead to recover his ancestral home at Okazaki Castle and declared his independence from the Imagawa clan.

Ōdaka Castle was abandoned soon afterwards. The site was later occupied by the residence of the hereditary karō of Owari Domain, the Shimizu clan, until the Meiji restoration.

The site is now the Odaka Castle Ruins Park, with some remnants of its kuruwa, double moats and earthen ramparts. The site of the tenshu in the inner bailey is slightly elevated, and is now occupied by a small Shinto shrine, the Shiroyama Hachiman-sha. It is located about 10 minutes on foot from the JR Central Tōkaidō Main Line Ōdaka Station.

== Gallery ==
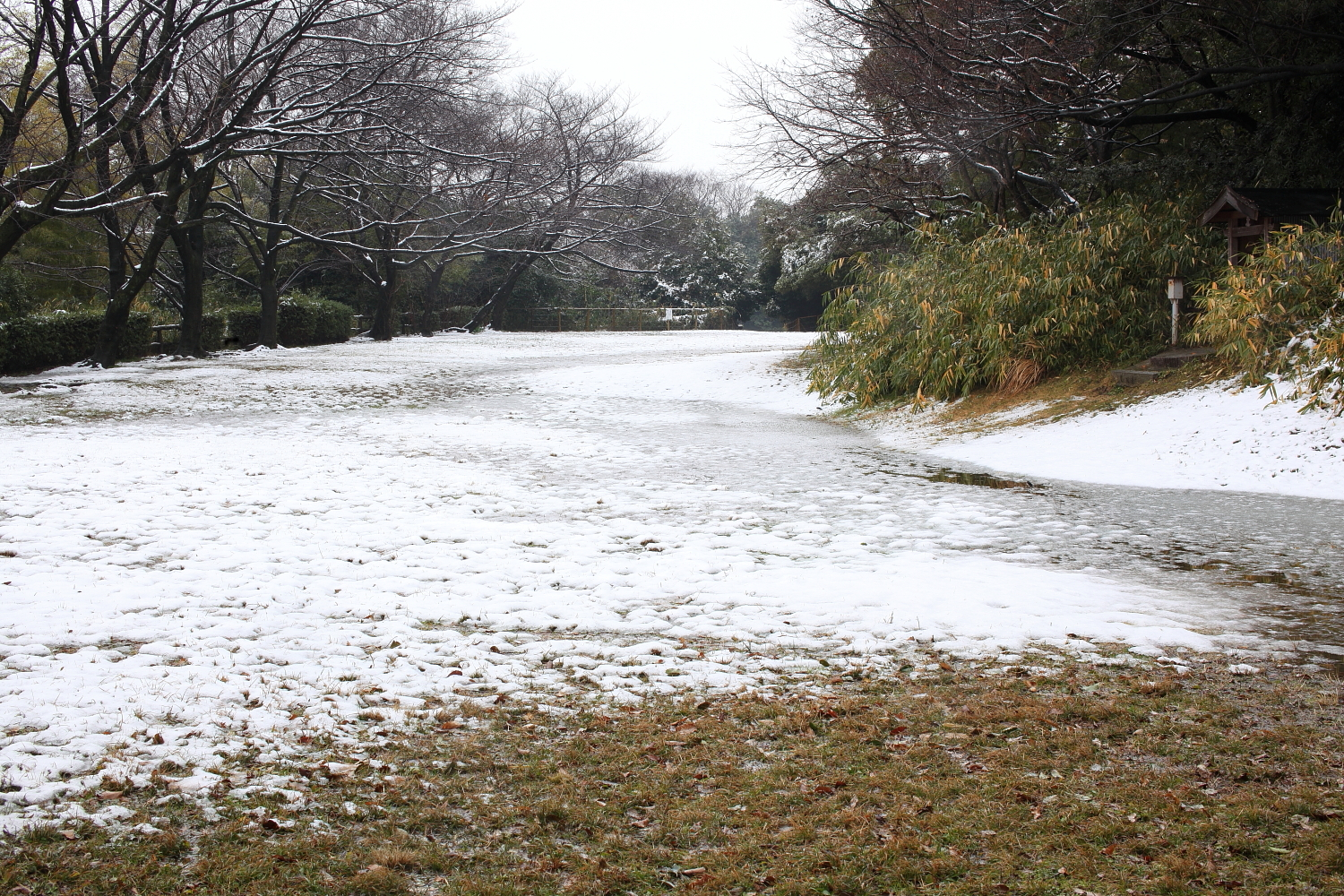
Site of the Main Bailey

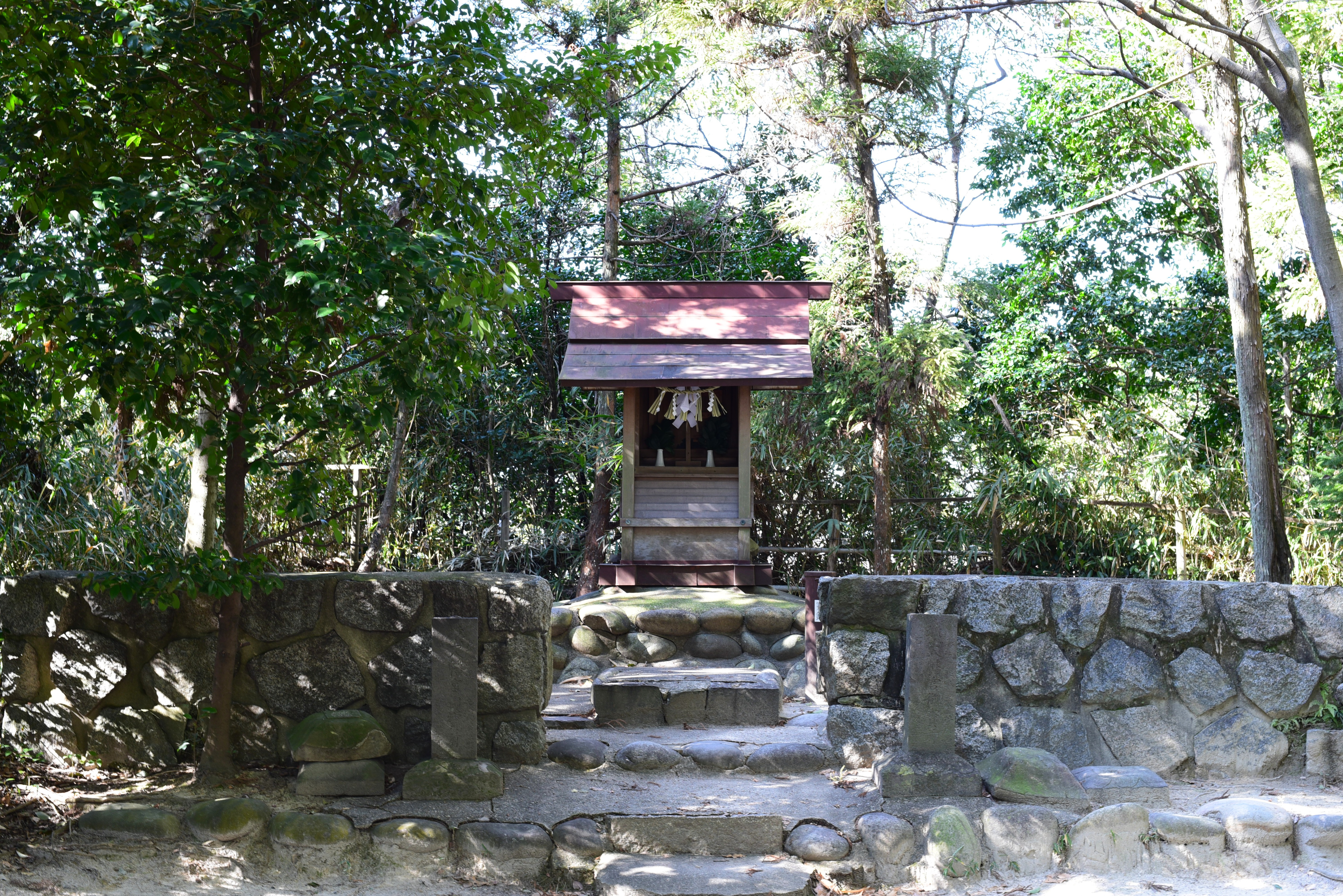
Shiroyama Hachiman-sha

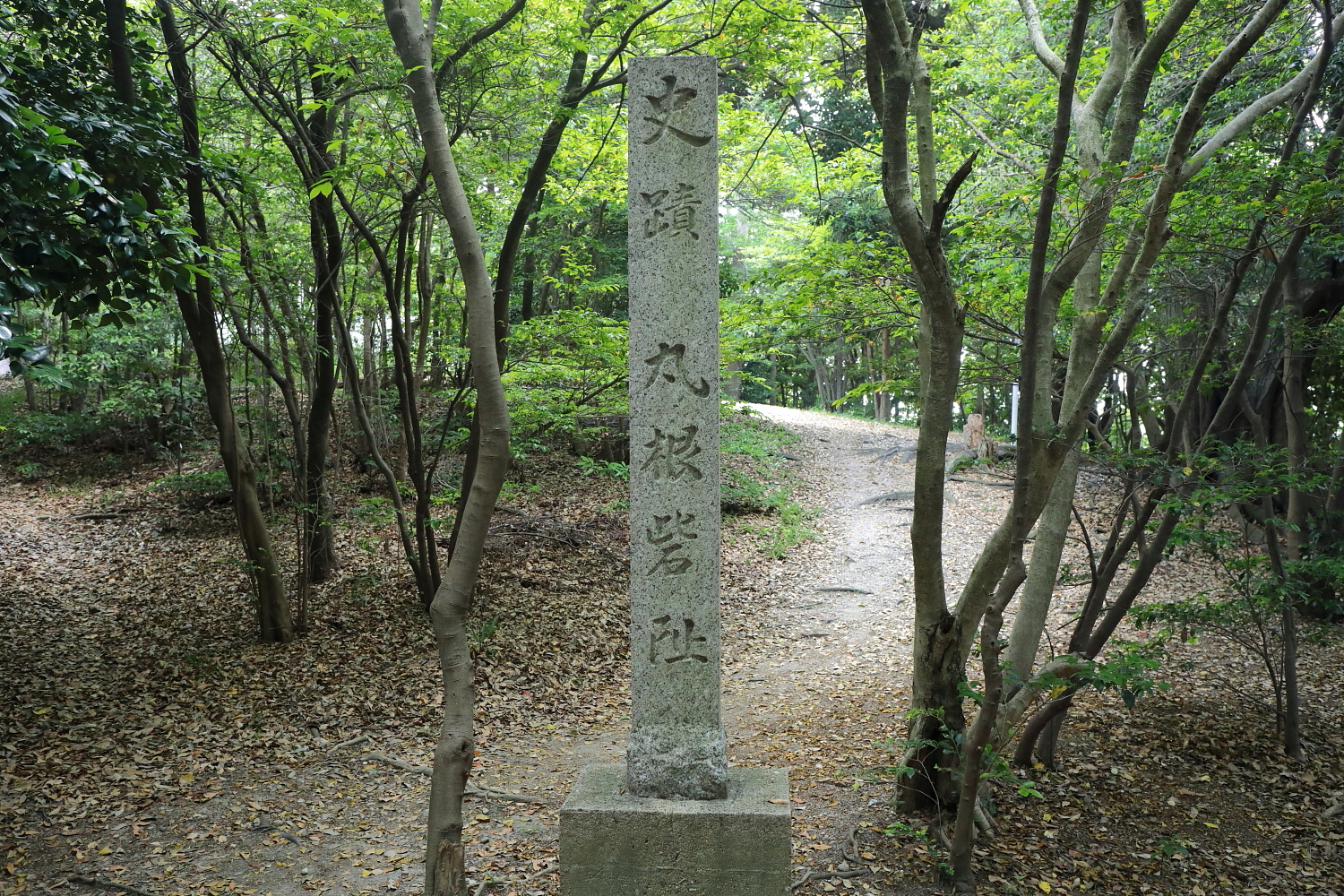
Ruins of Marune Castle

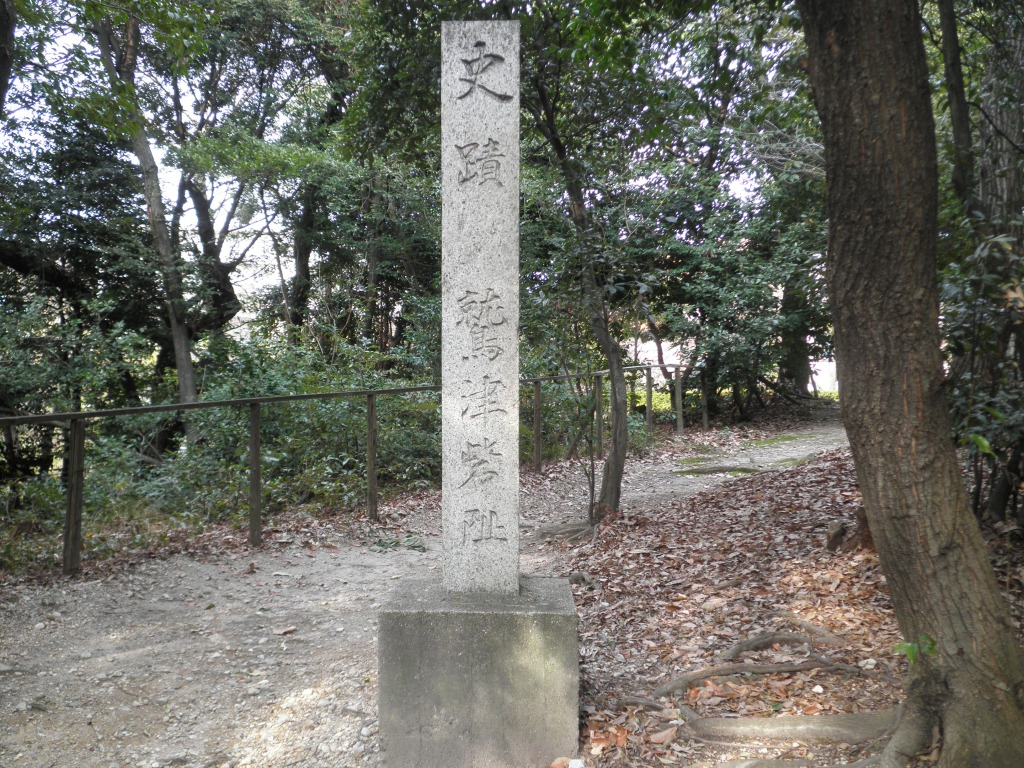
Site of Washizu Castle

== See also ==
- List of Historic Sites of Japan (Aichi)
