= Masamura Pachinko Museum =

Museum in Nagoya, Aichi, Japan

Coordinates: 35°07′14.7″N 136°57′49.7″E

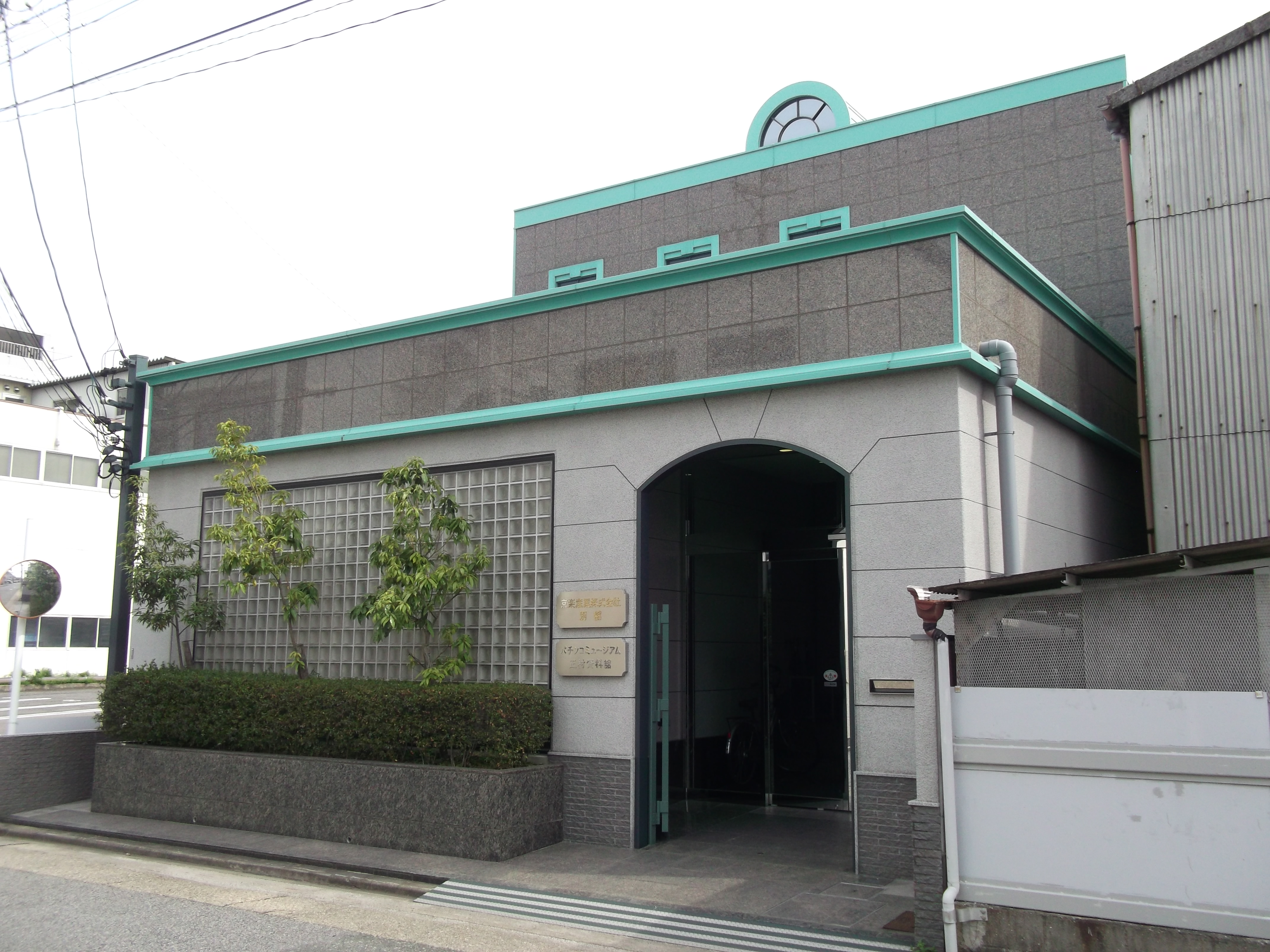
Masamura Pachinko Museum

The Masamura Pachinko Museum（パチンコミュージアム正村資料館） is a small Japanese pachinko museum currently located at 210 Nakasunachō in Tempaku-ku, Nagoya, Aichi Prefecture（愛知県名古屋市天白区中砂町210番地）.

== History ==
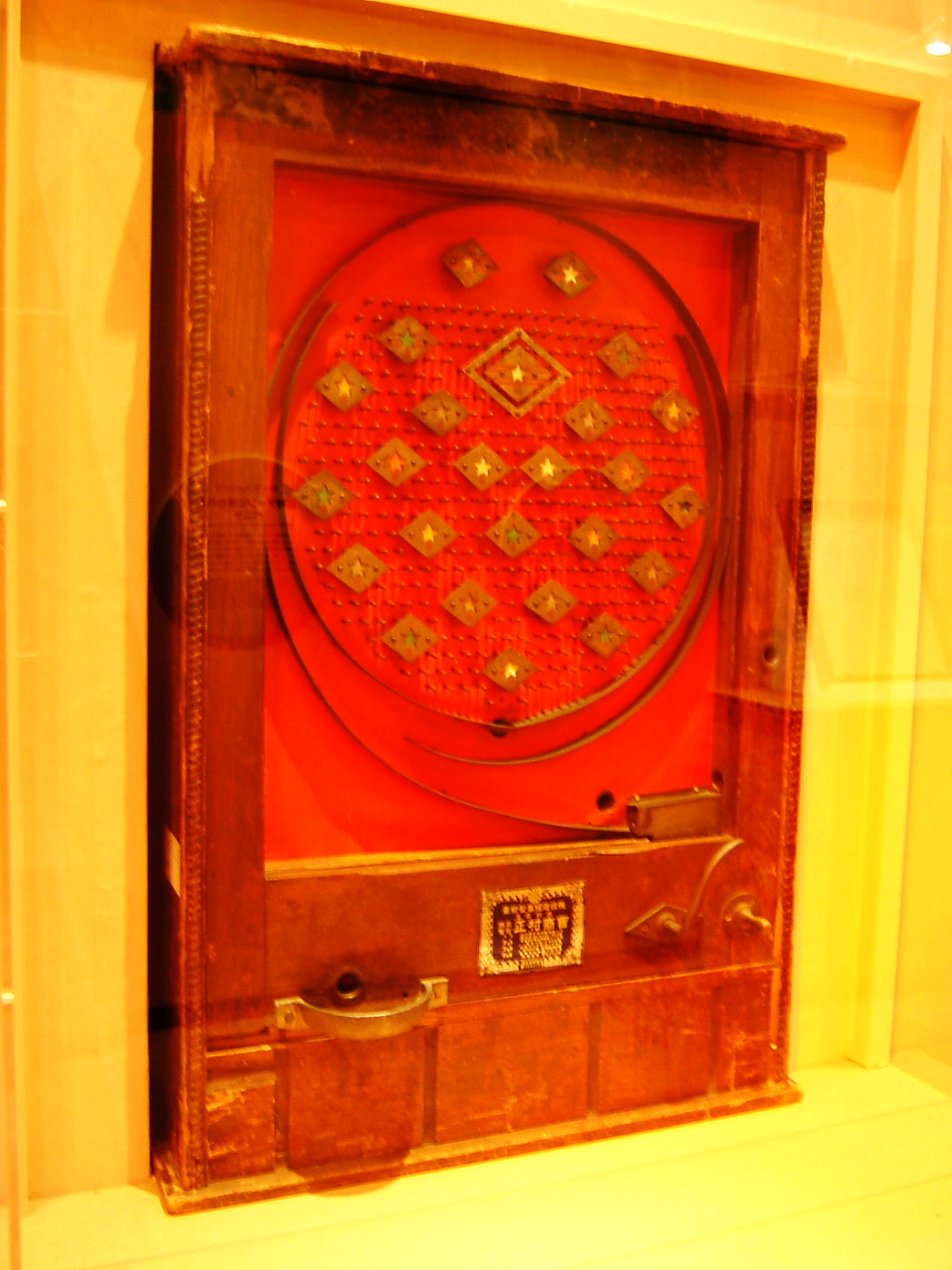
Masamura Gauge All 15

Pachinko is a popular gambling game in Japan, that traces its roots back to the early 20th century. The Masamura trading company from Nagoya constructed a museum in tribute to the company's founder Masamura Takeuchi on the third floor of the old Masamura Building in Nishi-ku. He is often acknowledged to be the creator of modern pachinko, by turning this children's game into an adult hobby. In the years after World War II, when supplies were short, he was able to build together some of the first pachinko machines made out of old tea chests and greenhouse glass. The legendary Masamura Gauge All 15 is remembered as the precursor to modern day Pachinko machines.

The museum documents the history in detail. It shows a different theory of the history of Pachinko though. Although the usual theory of the origins of pachinko states that the game is an adaptation of the American "Corinthian Game", which was a kind of very old pinball game. The museum however argues that the early machines might come from the vertical "wall machines" that were found in the late 19th century European penny arcades.

The museum has been relocated from Jōsai 4-19-6 (愛知県名古屋市西区城西四丁目19番6号) not far outside the Jōshin Station.
