= Three Great Spears of Japan =

Three Japanese spears

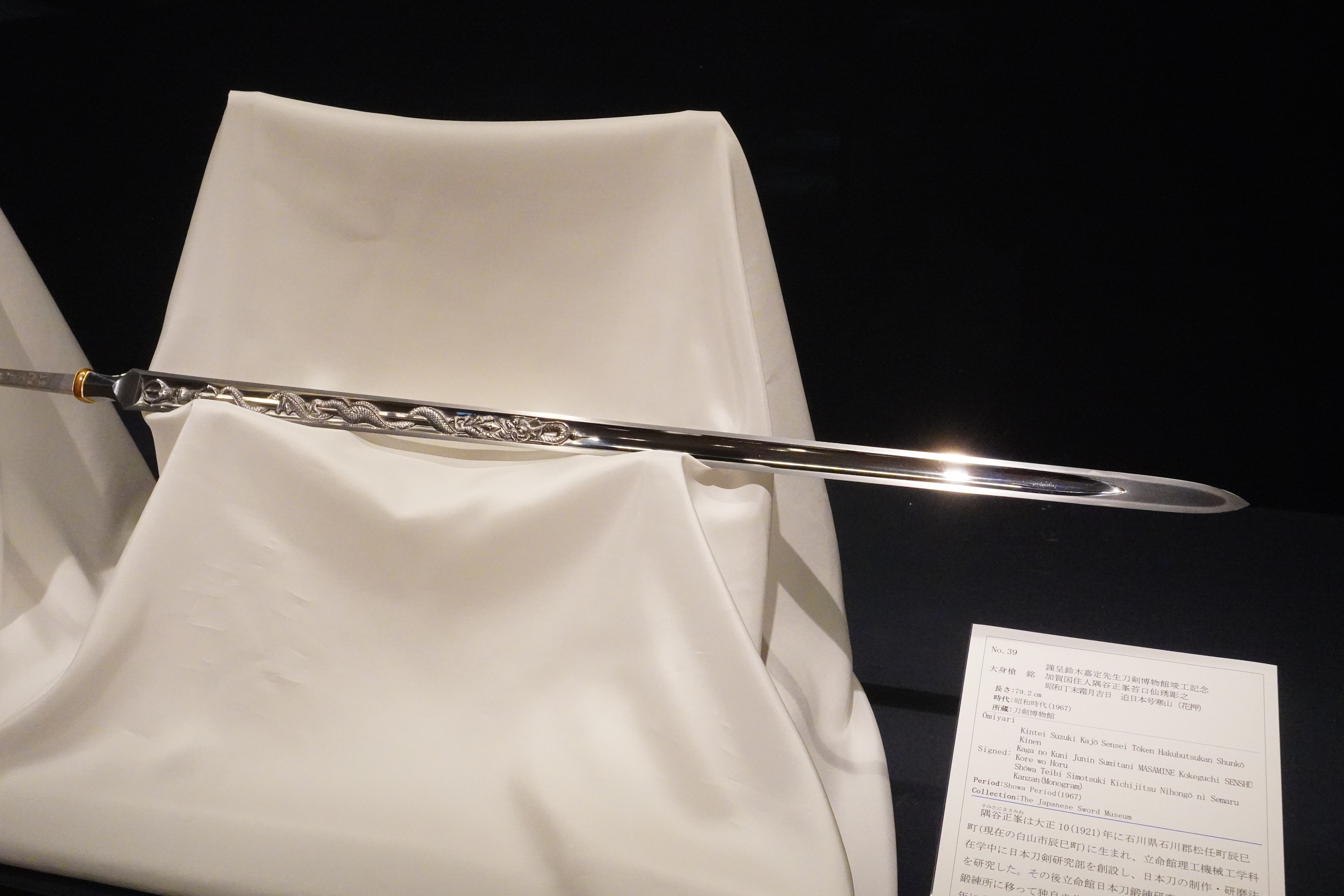
A reproduction of the Nihon-go, one of the Three Great Spears of Japan. Forged in 1967 by Living National Treasure Masamine Sumitani and engraved with a horimono by Sensyū Kokeguchi.

The Three Great Spears of Japan (天下三名槍; "Three Famous Spears under Heaven") are three individual spears (yari) that were made and crafted by the greatest historical blacksmiths of Japan:

1. Tonbokiri (蜻蛉切; also read Tonbogiri): This spear once wielded by Honda Tadakatsu, one of the great generals of Tokugawa Ieyasu. It was forged by Masazane, a disciple of Muramasa. It is now owned by a private individual and lent to the Sano Art Museum for its collection. The type of blade shape is sasaho yari.
2. Nihongō (日本号; also read Nippongō, Hinomotogō): A famous spear that was once used in the Imperial Palace. Nihongo later found its way into the possession of Fukushima Masanori, and then Tahei Mori. It is now at Fukuoka City Museum. The type of blade shape is omi yari.
3. Otegine (御手杵): It was a spear that Yuki Harutomo, a daimyo, ordered Shimada Gisuke, a swordsmith, to make. It was lost in the Bombing of Tokyo in 1945. The type of blade shape was omi yari.

== See also ==
- Tenka-Goken (Five Swords under Heaven) - five individual swords traditionally viewed as the best Japanese swords
