= Tonbokiri =

Legendary Japanese spear

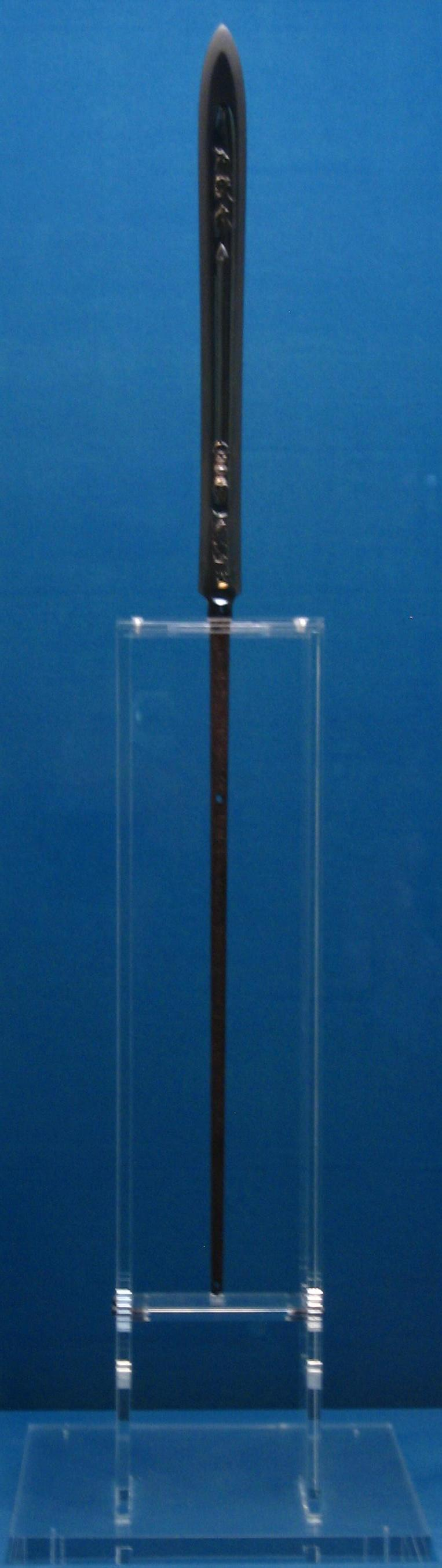
Replica of the Tonbokiri, made in 1847, in the Tokyo National Museum

The Tonbokiri (蜻蛉切) is one of three legendary Japanese spears created by the famed swordsmith Sengo Masazane, said to be wielded by the daimyō Honda Tadakatsu, a leading general of Tokugawa Ieyasu.

== Name ==
The spear derives its name from the myth that a dragonfly landed on its blade and was instantly cut in two. Thus tonbo (Japanese for "dragonfly") and kiri (Japanese for "cutting"), translating this spear's name as "Dragonfly Cutter".

== History ==
The weapon, along with Nihongō and Otegine, is listed as one of "three great spears" in the Kyōhō Meibutsucho, a listing of famous Koto blades made before the Nanbokucho period and compiled by the Hon'ami family during the Kyōhō era (1716–1735).

The Tonbokiri is owned by a private individual and is on loan to the Sano Art Museum for its collection.
