= Richard Merkin =

American artist

- Merkin in 1973
- Born: October 9, 1938; Brooklyn, New York
- Died: September 5, 2009 (aged 70); Croton-on-Hudson, New York
- Education: Syracuse University, Michigan State University, Rhode Island School of Design
- Known for: Painting and illustration
- Spouse: Heather G. Merkin

Richard Marshall Merkin (October 9, 1938 – September 5, 2009) was an American painter, illustrator and arts educator. Merkin's fascination with the 1920s and 1930s defined his art and shaped his identity as a professional dandy. Many of his works depict the interwar years, painting narrative scenes in bright colors of jazz musicians, film stars, writers, and sports heroes. Merkin was as well known for his outré sense of clothing style and collections of vintage pornography (in particular Tijuana bibles) as he was for his painting and illustration work.

He appears on the cover of the Beatles' Sgt. Pepper's Lonely Hearts Club Band (1967) and in a scene in the 1974 film The Great Gatsby.

== Biography ==
Merkin was born in a Jewish family in Brooklyn, New York, in 1938, and raised in East Flatbush. He held an undergraduate degree in fine art from Syracuse University in 1960, a Master's Degree in art from Michigan State University in 1961, and Master of Fine Arts in painting from the Rhode Island School of Design (RISD) in 1963. In 1962–63 he received a Louis Comfort Tiffany Foundation Fellowship in Painting and, in 1975, the Richard and Hinda Rosenthal Foundation Award from the National Institute of Arts and Letters.

Merkin began teaching at RISD in 1963 and remained there for 42 years, during which time he built his reputation in New York. After he moved back to New York in 1967, he commuted every week to RISD to teach painting and drawing. At RISD, Merkin was loved and revered. One alum described him as "fearless beyond measure." Some notable students Merkin taught at RISD include Chris Frantz and Tina Weymouth of the band Talking Heads and Martin Mull.

Merkin on the cover of the Beatles' Sgt. Pepper's Lonely Hearts Club Band (left) and the photograph his image was sourced from (right)

Before Merkin was well known as an artist, his newfound friend Peter Blake featured him on the cover of the Beatles' Sgt. Pepper's Lonely Hearts Club Band (1967), on the top row between Fred Astaire and a 'Vargas Girl'. Four decades later, Merkin stated of his experience:

I went to England in 1966 ... and I got to meet a lot of artists that I enormously admired: David Hockney, Peter Blake, R. B. Kitaj ...

I spent that summer in London, and I became a close friend of Peter Blake ... [S]ix months later, I got a photograph in the mail of the cover of Sgt. Pepper's ... The photograph of me comes from a very early exhibition catalogue of mine ...

I sold the photograph ... for [probably] $200. That photograph would be worth $10,000 now!

People say to me, "Didn't you love the Beatles?" I'd say, "... I didn't give a goddamn about the Beatles!" I loved Bill Evans, I love Bobby Short. Now I like [Sgt. Pepper's], it's grown on me over time.

Merkin was briefly featured in a party scene in the 1974 film The Great Gatsby.

Beginning in 1986, Merkin was a contributing editor for Vanity Fair. Starting in 1988, he was a regular contributor of illustrations to The New Yorker, as well as Harper's and The New York Times' Sunday magazine. From 1988–1991, he wrote a monthly style column called "Merkin on Style" for Gentlemen's Quarterly. Merkin also designed several album covers for the jazz record label Chiaroscuro Records for artists such as Mary Lou Williams, Ruby Braff, and Ellis Larkins.

Merkin died on September 5, 2009, at his home in Croton-on-Hudson, New York, after a long illness. He was 70 years old. He was survived by his wife Heather Merkin.

Merkin's career at The New Yorker spanned twenty years, three covers, and nearly three hundred illustrations. Merkin is represented in the permanent collections of the Museum of Modern Art, the Smithsonian Institution, Brooklyn Museum and the Whitney Museum, among others.

== Style ==
Merkin was known for his dandy sensibility. He told The New York Times, "I deplore fashion. ... What I like is style." In 1986, Merkin told the Daily News Record, a fashion publication: "Dressing, like painting, should have a residual stability, plus punctuation and surprise ... Somewhere, like in Krazy Kat, you've got to throw the brick." Upon his death, his friend, menswear designer Alan Flusser said of him,

He was one of the few men who knew how to wear clothes, in a bespoke Bohemian manner. ... You have to be way beyond fashion to do this.

Merkin's friend, the writer Tom Wolfe wrote:

He was the greatest of that breed, the Artist Dandy, since Sargent, Whistler and Dali. Like Dali, he had one of the few remaining Great Mustaches in the art world. ... What made Merkin so sought after as an illustrator was his eccentric approach to modernist art. He used Modernism's all-over flat designs--that is, every square inch of the canvas was covered by flat, unmodulated blocs of color of equal value, creating not three but two dimensions--but his works were full of people, rendered in the same fashion, in comic poses and situations and extravagantly caricatured.

The New Yorker noted that Merkin

loved and evoked the great spirit of the nineteen-twenties, thirties, and forties in his work – he was, moreover, "a connoisseur of the good life."

== Works ==
=== Bibliography ===
- 1967 – The Stuff That Dreams Are Made Of, catalogue of exhibition held at the Byron Gallery, Madison Avenue, New York.
- 1968 – Jazz Age: As Seen Through the Eyes of Ralph Barton, Miguel Covarrubias & John Held, Jr, RISD art exhibition catalog with introduction by Richard Merkin featuring writing and works Ralph Barton, Miguel Covarrubias, John Held Jr
- 1969 – On Art and Perfume or Did Mondrian Use Masking Tape? M.I.T. Office of Publications, 1969. Exhibition catalog, Hayden Gallery, M.I.T., November 7 to December 2, 1969.
- 1979 – Velvet Eden - The Richard Merkin Collection of Erotic Photography, by Richard Merkin and Bruce McCall. Merkin was also an avid collector of vintage pornography, and part of his collection was published in this book.
- 1992 – Better Days Recent Paintings By Richard Merkin, written by Tom Wolfe and Richard Merkin (published by Helander Gallery)
- 1993 – Memoirs of a Woman of Pleasure, written by John Cleland and cover illustration By Richard Merkin
- 1995 – Leagues Apart: The Men and Times of the Negro Baseball Leagues, by Larry Ritter and illustrated by Richard Merkin
- 1997 – Tijuana Bibles: Art and Wit in America's Forbidden Funnies, 1930s-1950s, written by Bob Adelman, Richard Merkin and Art Spiegelman

=== Notable exhibitions ===
- 1962 – Boston Arts Festival
- 1963 – DeCordova Museum
- 1964 – Rhode Island Arts Festival
- 1964 – DeCordova Museum
- 1965 – DeCordova Museum
- 1965 – Obelisk Gallery, Boston
- 1967–1968 – Whitney Museum of American Art
- 1967 – Byron Gallery, Madison Avenue, New York between February 15 – March 11, 1967.
- 1979 – Gallery Camino Real, Florida
- 2004 – Solo exhibition, Gallery 444, San Francisco
- 2010 – Solo exhibition, Garrison Art Center
- 2010 – Big Paper Winter, group exhibition, Woodward Gallery
