= Neko-dera =

Another name for a temple related to cats

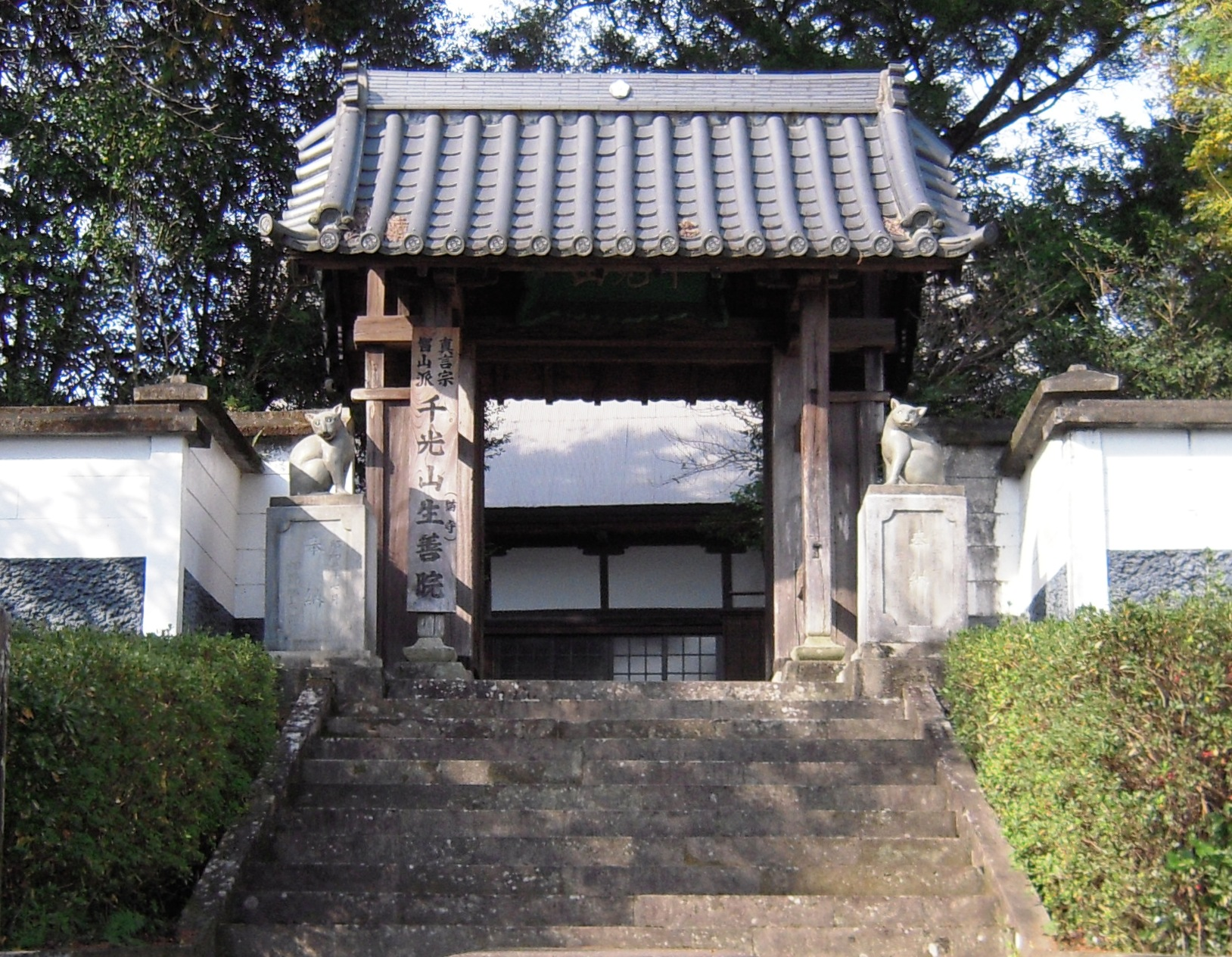
Sanmon at Shōzen-in with "komaneko"

Neko-dera (Japanese: 猫寺; lit. 'cat temple') is the common name for Buddhist temples in Japan that have strong ties to cats. Many such places are dedicated to the veneration of cats due to the belief they were either saved or cursed by cats in the past.

== Main "Neko-dera" ==
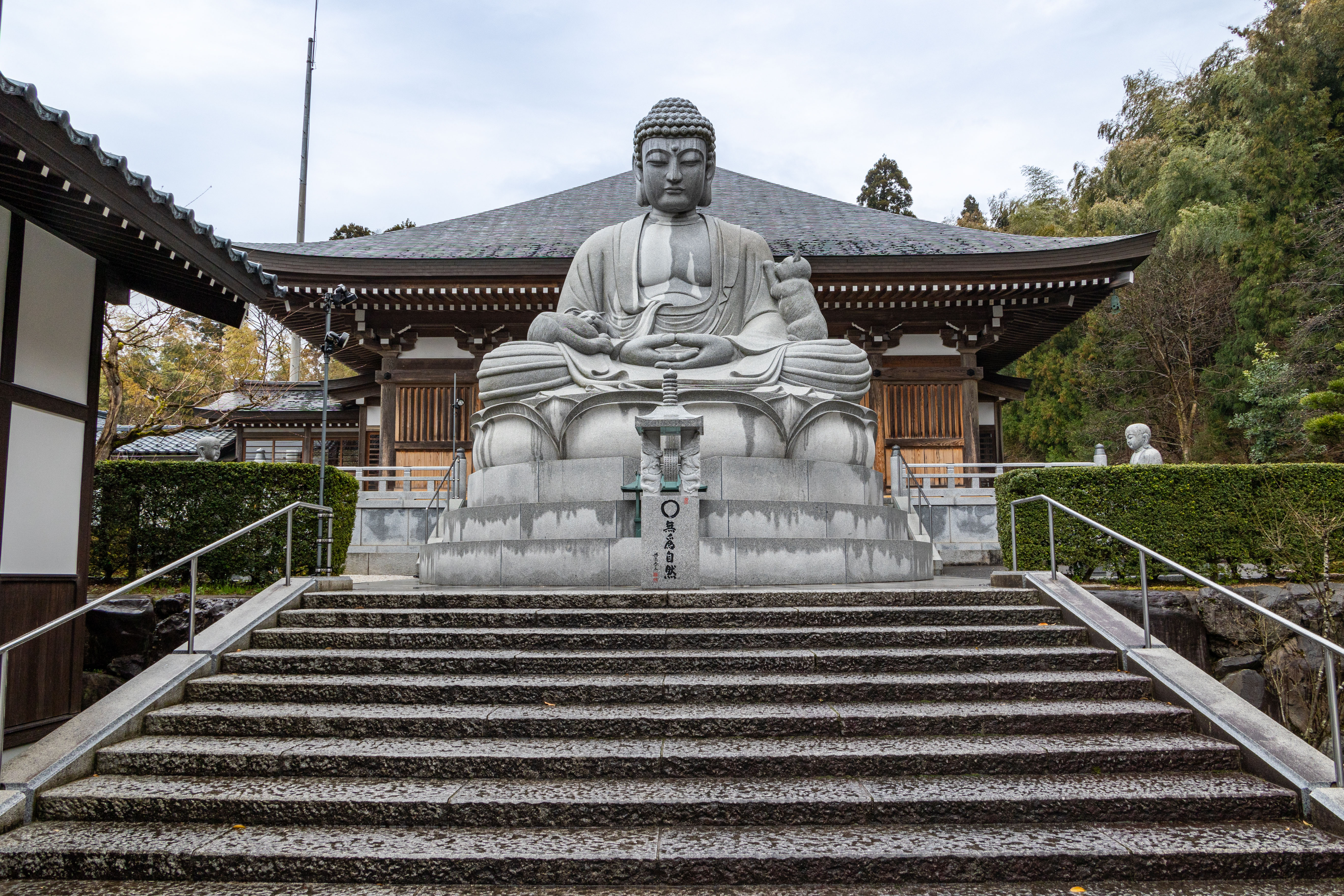
Image of the Buddha with cats at Gotanjō-ji

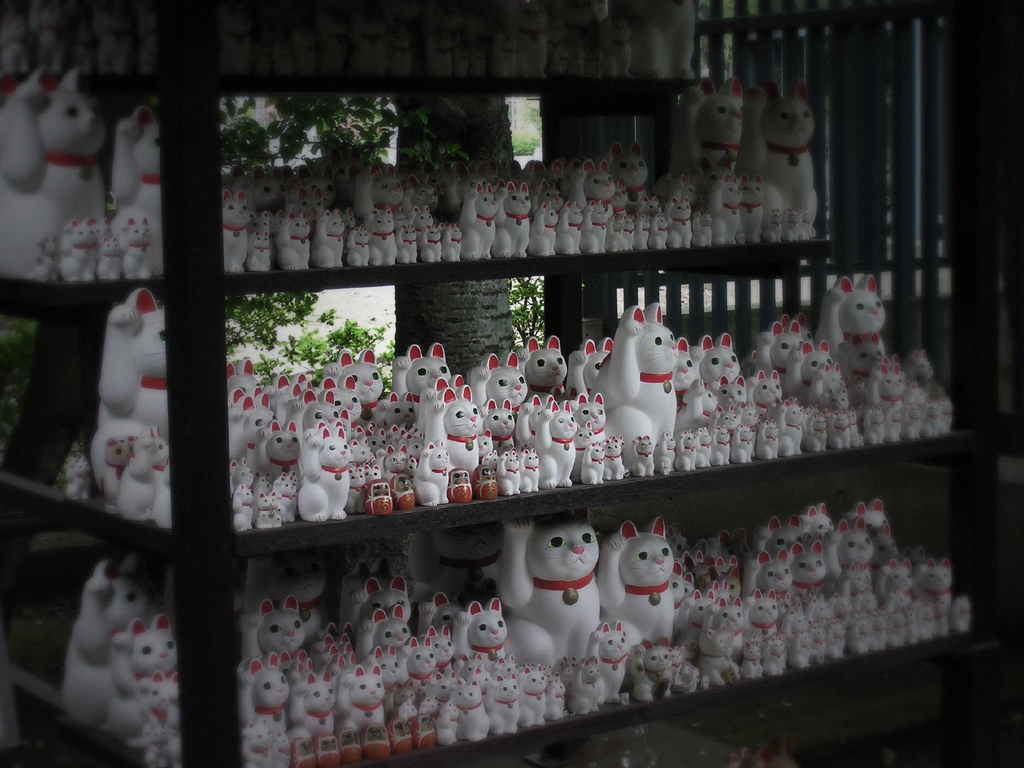
Maneki-neko at Gōtoku-ji

Shōnen-ji in Kamigyō-ku, Kyoto is commonly known as Neko-dera. According to legend, the third abbot of the temple had a cat who one day disguised itself as a beautiful princess and began to dance despite the financial hardships the abbot faced. After being chased out of the temple, she appeared to him in a dream, informing him that she had successfully persuaded the once-distanced Matsudaira family to financially support the temple again. This led to the reestablishment of the temple, an act of repayment for her past behavior. Today, the temple holds memorial services for animals, including cats.

Shōzen-in in Mizukami, Kumamoto retains a legend which states that its founding was due to the Sagara family being cursed by a vengeful cat spirit, leading to the sudden death of the 19th head of the family, Sagara Tadafusa.

Daikeizan Gōtoku-ji is said to be the birthplace of the maneki-neko. According to legend, Ii Naotaka, the daimyō of the Hikone Domain was beckoned to the temple gate by a cat, narrowly escaping a thunderstorm. This story is also the origin of the mascot Hikonyan.

Jishō-in in Shinjuku has enshrined a hibutsu image called Neko-Jizō (猫地蔵), a cat-like image of Kṣitigarbha displayed publicly during Setsubun. The origins of this image is based on the legend of Ōta Dōkan coming out victorious after the Battle of Ekoda and Numabukurohara with the help of a cat.

Gotanjō-ji in Echizen, Fukui serves as a shelter for sick and abandoned cats.

== See also ==
- Kaibyō
- Kasha (folklore)
