= List of images on the cover of Sgt. Pepper's Lonely Hearts Club Band =

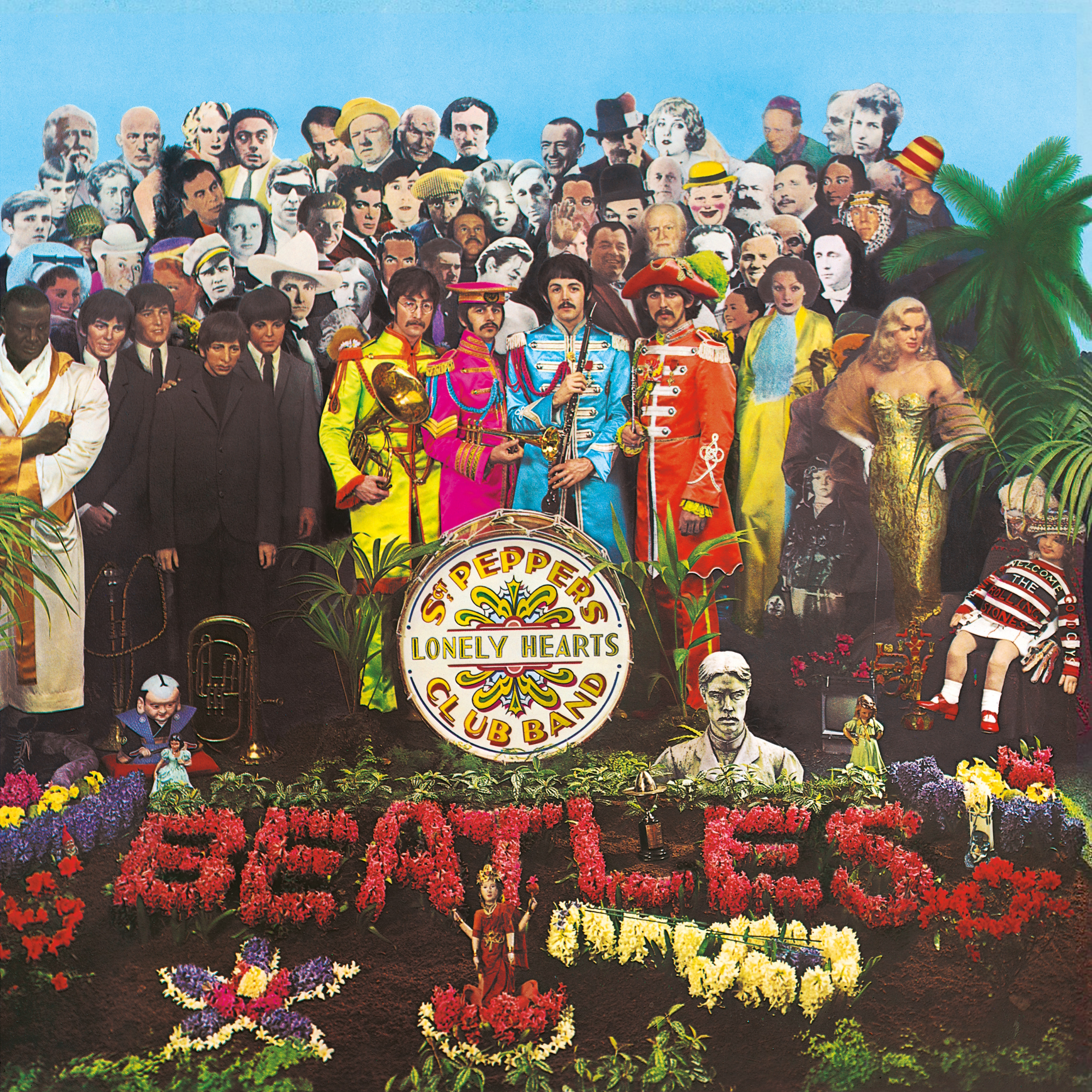
Sgt. Pepper's Lonely Hearts Club Band (1967)

The Beatles' 1967 album Sgt. Pepper's Lonely Hearts Club Band has a widely recognized album cover that depicts several dozen celebrities and other images. It was created by artists Jann Haworth and Peter Blake. Besides the Beatles themselves, most individuals are depicted via roughly life-sized photographic cut-outs. The lineup was chosen by the band, Blake, and others. It encompasses actors, musicians, visual artists, writers, gurus, and other historical figures.

The crowd also includes wax sculptures and pin-up art, with various other objects arranged in the foreground. Some figures were modelled but excluded to avoid controversy, namely Adolf Hitler and Mahatma Gandhi. Jesus Christ was excluded due to John Lennon's recent "more popular than Jesus" remark and the band regarded Elvis Presley too highly to feature him as merely a face within the crowd.

== Concept ==
The cover image was created by Jann Haworth and Peter Blake, who in 1967 won the Grammy Award for Best Album Cover, Graphic Arts, for their work on it. The image was made by posing the Beatles in front of life-sized black and white photographs pasted onto hardboard and hand-tinted. Blake has said that the intention was to show a new band surrounded by fans after a performance. In an interview with American Songwriter, he said:

I suggested that they had just played a concert in the park. They were posing for a photograph and the crowd behind them was a crowd of fans who had been at the concert. Having decided on this, then, by making cut-outs, the fans could be anybody, dead or alive, real or fictitious. If we wanted Hansel and Gretel, I could paint them and they could be photographed and blown up. I asked the four Beatles for a list and I did one myself. Robert Fraser did a list and I can't remember whether Brian Epstein did one or not. The way that worked out was fascinating. John gave me a list and so did Paul. George suggested only Indian gurus, about six of them, and Ringo said, "Whatever the others say is fine by me" and didn't suggest anyone. It's an insight into their characters. All kinds of people were suggested. Hitler was there; he is actually in the set-up, but he is covered by the Beatles themselves as we felt he was too controversial. The same applied to Jesus. There were only two of their contemporaries on the cover. Bob Dylan was suggested by John and I put on Dion because he is a great favourite of mine.

== People ==
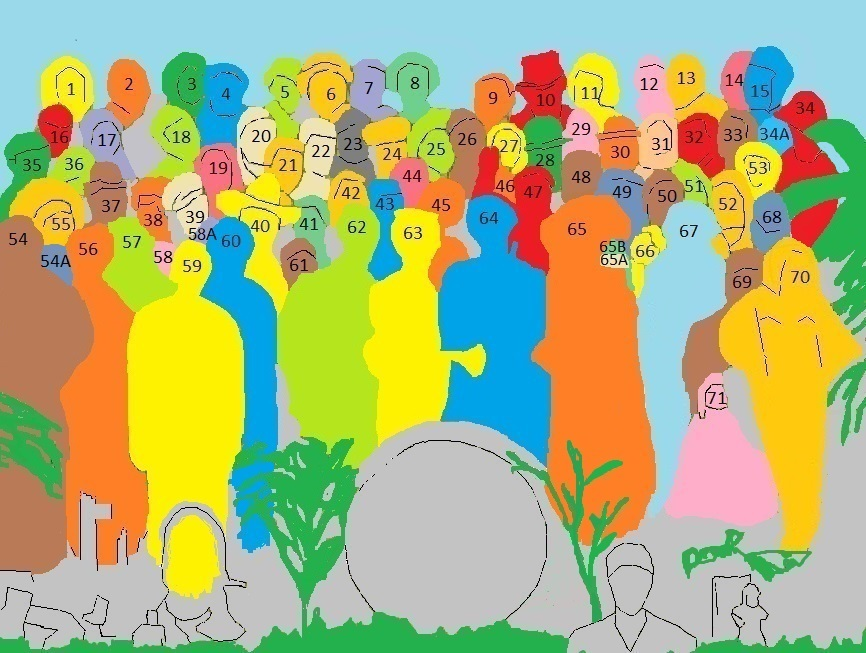
Identification chart

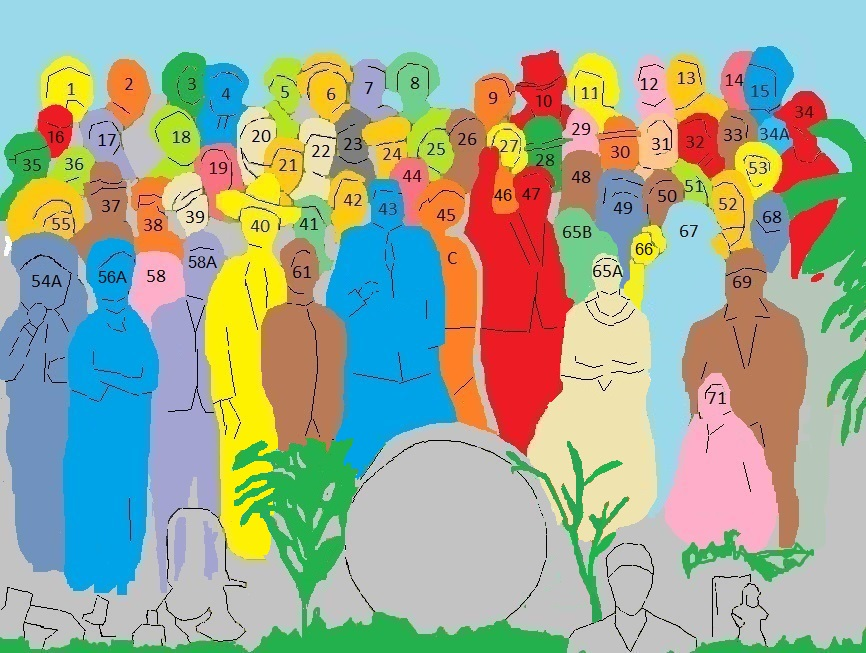
With the Beatles and most of the wax statues removed

=== Top row ===
- (1) Sri Yukteswar Giri (Hindu guru)
- (2) Aleister Crowley (occultist)
- (3) Mae West (actress)
- (4) Lenny Bruce (comedian)
- (5) Karlheinz Stockhausen (composer)
- (6) W. C. Fields (comedian/actor)
- (7) Carl Jung (psychiatrist)
- (8) Edgar Allan Poe (writer)
- (9) Fred Astaire (actor/dancer)
- (10) Richard Merkin (artist and friend of Peter Blake)
- (11) The Vargas Girl (by artist Alberto Vargas)
- (12) Leo Gorcey (image was removed from cover, but a space remains)
- (13) Huntz Hall (actor)
- (14) Simon Rodia (designer and builder of the Watts Towers)
- (15) Bob Dylan (singer/songwriter)

=== Second row ===
- (16) Aubrey Beardsley (illustrator)
- (17) Sir Robert Peel (19th-century British Prime Minister)
- (18) Aldous Huxley (writer)
- (19) Dylan Thomas (poet)
- (20) Terry Southern (writer)
- (21) Dion DiMucci (singer/songwriter)
- (22) Tony Curtis (actor)
- (23) Wallace Berman (artist)
- (24) Tommy Handley (comedian)
- (25) Marilyn Monroe (actress)
- (26) William S. Burroughs (writer)
- (27) Sri Mahavatar Babaji (Hindu guru)
- (28) Stan Laurel (actor/comedian)
- (29) Richard Lindner (artist)
- (30) Oliver Hardy (actor/comedian)
- (31) Karl Marx (political philosopher)
- (32) H. G. Wells (writer)
- (33) Sri Paramahansa Yogananda (Hindu guru)
- (34A) James Joyce (Irish poet and novelist) – barely visible below Bob Dylan
- (34) Anonymous (hairdresser's wax dummy)

=== Third row ===
- (35) Stuart Sutcliffe (artist/former Beatle)
- (36) Anonymous (hairdresser's wax dummy)
- (37) Max Miller (comedian)
- (38) A "Petty Girl" (by artist George Petty)
- (39) Marlon Brando (actor)
- (40) Tom Mix (actor)
- (41) Oscar Wilde (writer)
- (42) Tyrone Power (actor)
- (43) Larry Bell (artist)
- (44) David Livingstone (missionary/explorer)
- (45) Johnny Weissmuller (Olympic swimmer/Tarzan actor)
- (46) Stephen Crane (writer) – barely visible between Issy Bonn's head and raised arm
- (47) Issy Bonn (comedian)
- (48) George Bernard Shaw (playwright)
- (49) H. C. Westermann (sculptor)
- (50) Albert Stubbins (English footballer)
- (51) Sri Lahiri Mahasaya (guru)
- (52) Lewis Carroll (writer)
- (53) T. E. Lawrence ("Lawrence of Arabia")

=== Front row ===
- (54) Wax model of Sonny Liston (boxer)
- (55) A "Petty Girl" (by George Petty)
- (56) Wax model of George Harrison
- (57) Wax model of John Lennon
- (58) Shirley Temple (child actress) – barely visible behind the wax models of John and Ringo, first of two appearances on the cover
- (59) Wax model of Ringo Starr
- (60) Wax model of Paul McCartney
- (61) Albert Einstein (physicist) – largely obscured
- (62) John Lennon holding a French horn
- (63) Ringo Starr holding a trumpet
- (64) Paul McCartney holding a cor anglais
- (65) George Harrison holding a piccolo
- (65A) Bette Davis (actress) – hair barely visible on top of George's shoulder
- (66) Bobby Breen (singer)
- (67) Marlene Dietrich (actress/singer)
- (68) Mahatma Gandhi was planned for this position, but was deleted prior to publication
- (69) An American legionnaire
- (70) Wax model of Diana Dors (actress)
- (71) Shirley Temple (child actress) – second appearance on the cover

== Props ==
- A hookah (water pipe)
- A Fukusuke, Japanese figure associated with good luck
- A stone figure of Snow White
- A baritone horn
- A drumhead, designed by fairground artist Joe Ephgrave
- An idol of the Hindu goddess Lakshmi
- A trophy
- An antique stone bust of a Victorian man brought over from Lennon's house (which provided the basis for the album's cutout portrait of Sgt. Pepper)
- A 9-inch (23 cm) Sony television set, apparently purchased in Japan by McCartney but provided by Lennon
- A stone figure of a girl
- Cloth doll by Haworth of Shirley Temple wearing a sweater that reads "Welcome The Rolling Stones Good Guys" – third and last appearance on the cover
- A white toy car
- A three-stringed left-handed flower guitar
- Another stone figure
- A garden gnome
- A cloth snake
- Flowers
- Palm trees
- Fern

== Excluded and obscured people ==
- (12) Leo Gorcey – modelled and originally included to the left of Huntz Hall, but subsequently removed when a fee of $400 ($3,988 in 2026) was requested for the use of the actor's likeness
- (45C) Adolf Hitler – requested by Lennon ("just to be a naughty boy" according to producer George Martin) and modelled behind the band (to the right of Larry Bell) and replaced by Johnny Weissmuller. Blake uniquely claims that Hitler was hidden behind the band during the final shoot. (Note: This is not apparent from any published photographs showing the nearly complete setup—even in those unobscured by the band.)
- (54A) Unidentified figure – barely visible behind the wax figure of Harrison (Note: Blake later stated that he was unaware of the figure's identity.)
  - A second unidentified figure in a behind-the-scenes photo
- (56A) Sophia Loren (actress) – behind the Beatles' waxworks
- (58A) Marcello Mastroianni (actor) – behind the Beatles' waxworks, only the top of the hat slightly visible
- (65B) Timothy Carey (actor) – modelled and originally included but largely obscured by Harrison in the final picture
- (68) Mahatma Gandhi – modelled and originally included to the right of Lewis Carroll, but subsequently removed. EMI head Joseph Lockwood felt that the Indian market would regard Gandhi's depiction amongst a group of entertainers as disrespectful.
- Jesus Christ – requested by Lennon, but not modelled due to the recent controversy ignited by Lennon's "more popular than Jesus" statement
- Elvis Presley – one of the Beatles' inspirations, the band regarded Elvis too highly to feature him as merely a face within the crowd

== See also ==
- Sgt. Pepper's Lonely Hearts Club Band
- The Beatles timeline
- Outline of the Beatles
- Wax sculpture
