= Fukusuke =

Traditional porcelain dolls associated with good luck in Japan

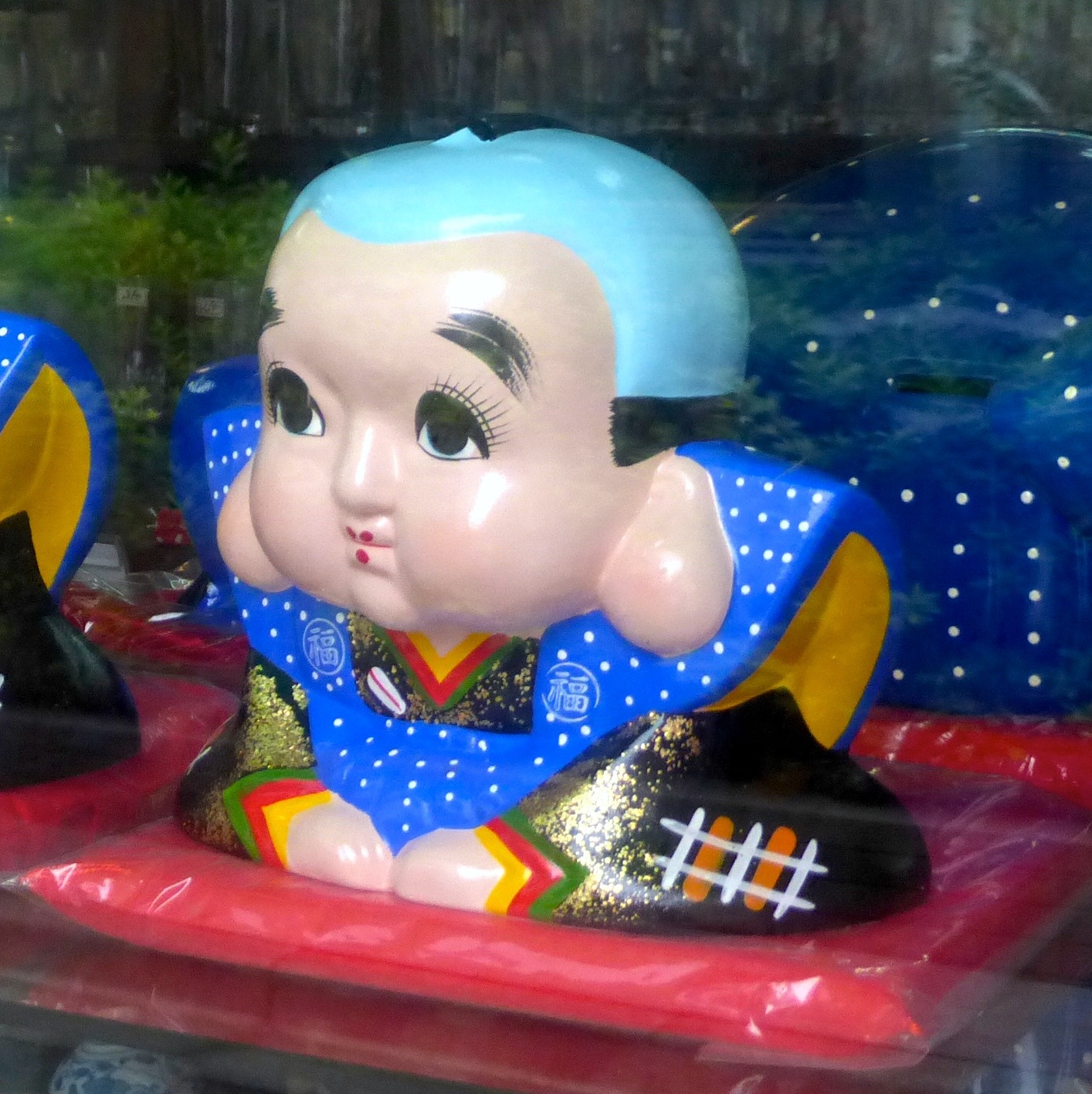
An example of a Fukusuke doll

Fukusuke (福助) are traditional dolls associated with good luck in Japan. A Fukusuke doll is the depiction of a man kneeling seiza style, with a large head and a topknot.

== History ==
It was originally a doll enshrined in tea houses or brothels in the Edo period to bring good luck. In those days, it was considered that Fukusuke would bring "perennial youth, wealth and honor".

The doll usually wears a kataginu (かたぎぬ), a kind of vest with exaggerated shoulders. While this kind of garment was worn by samurai or court officials, some say that Fukusuke was based on a daimyō of Kyoto. The origin of the Fukusuke doll is not clear, others say that its origin is found in the kami of luck or fuku no kami (福の神) called Kanō Fukusuke (叶福助) in the Edo period.

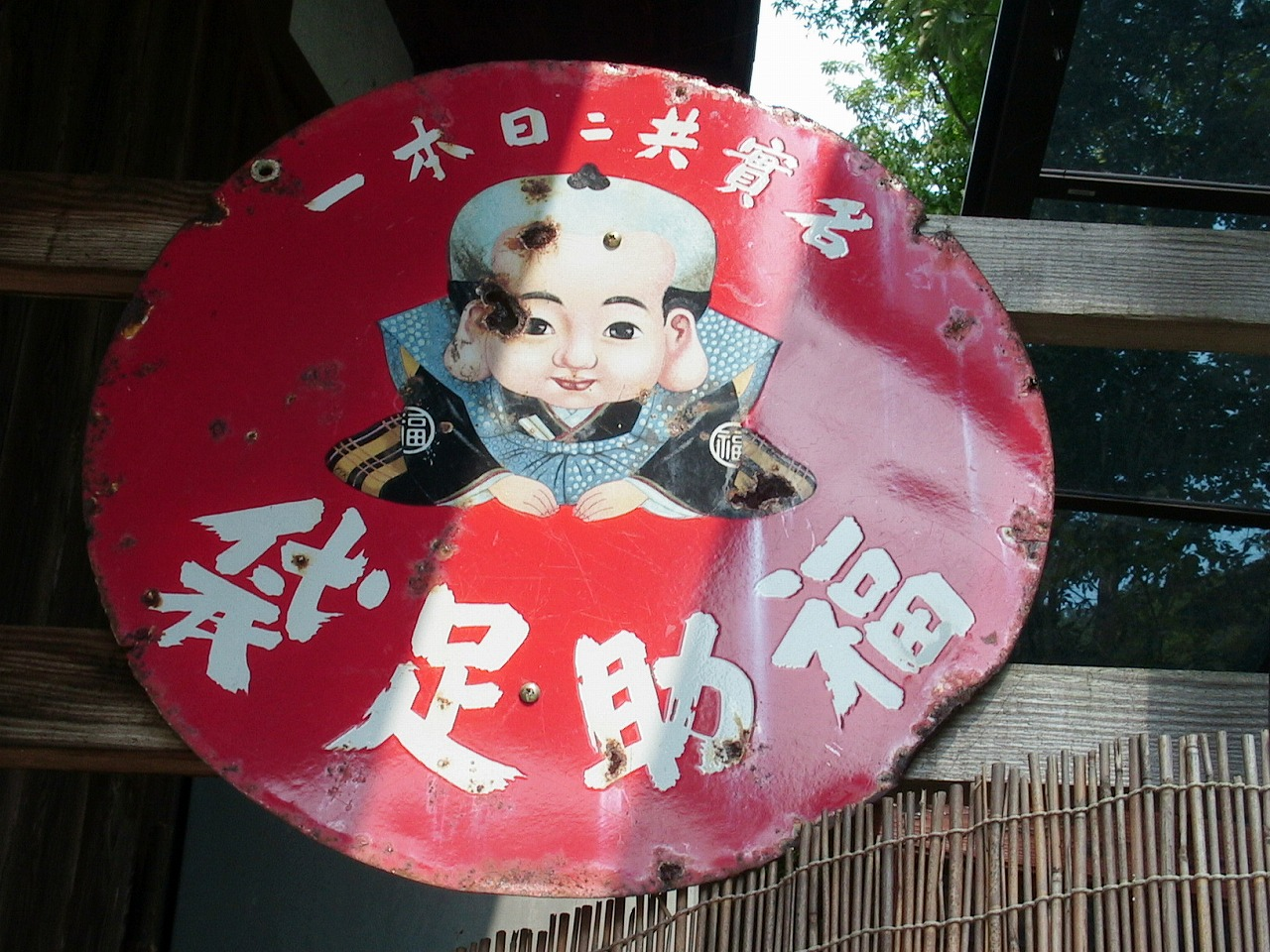
The logo of the Fukusuke Corporation is a Fukusake.

Fukusuke is often seen in business establishments, and is today treated as a common good luck icon. Many are made of Chinese porcelain and others handcraft.

== Sgt. Pepper's Lonely Hearts Club Band ==
Fukusuke was one of the characters featured on the cover of the Beatles' album Sgt. Pepper's Lonely Hearts Club Band (1967).

== See also ==
- Daruma
- Maneki-neko
- Tanuki a Japanese raccoon dog, wears a straw hat which protects him from bad luck, an account book, and a bottle of sake in his hands, all symbols of prosperity in business.
