= Calico cat =

Cat with a three-colored coat

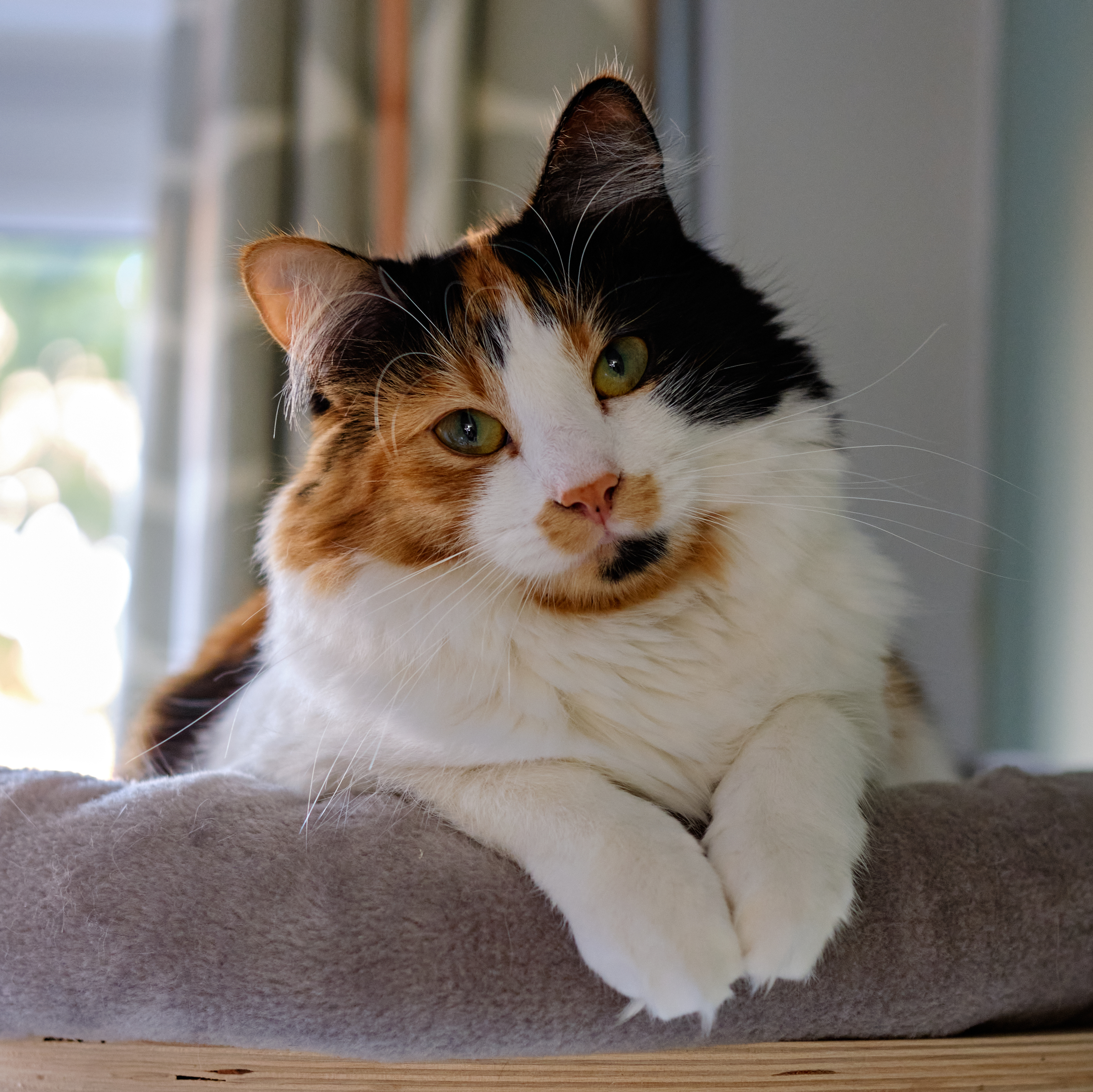
A long-haired adult calico cat

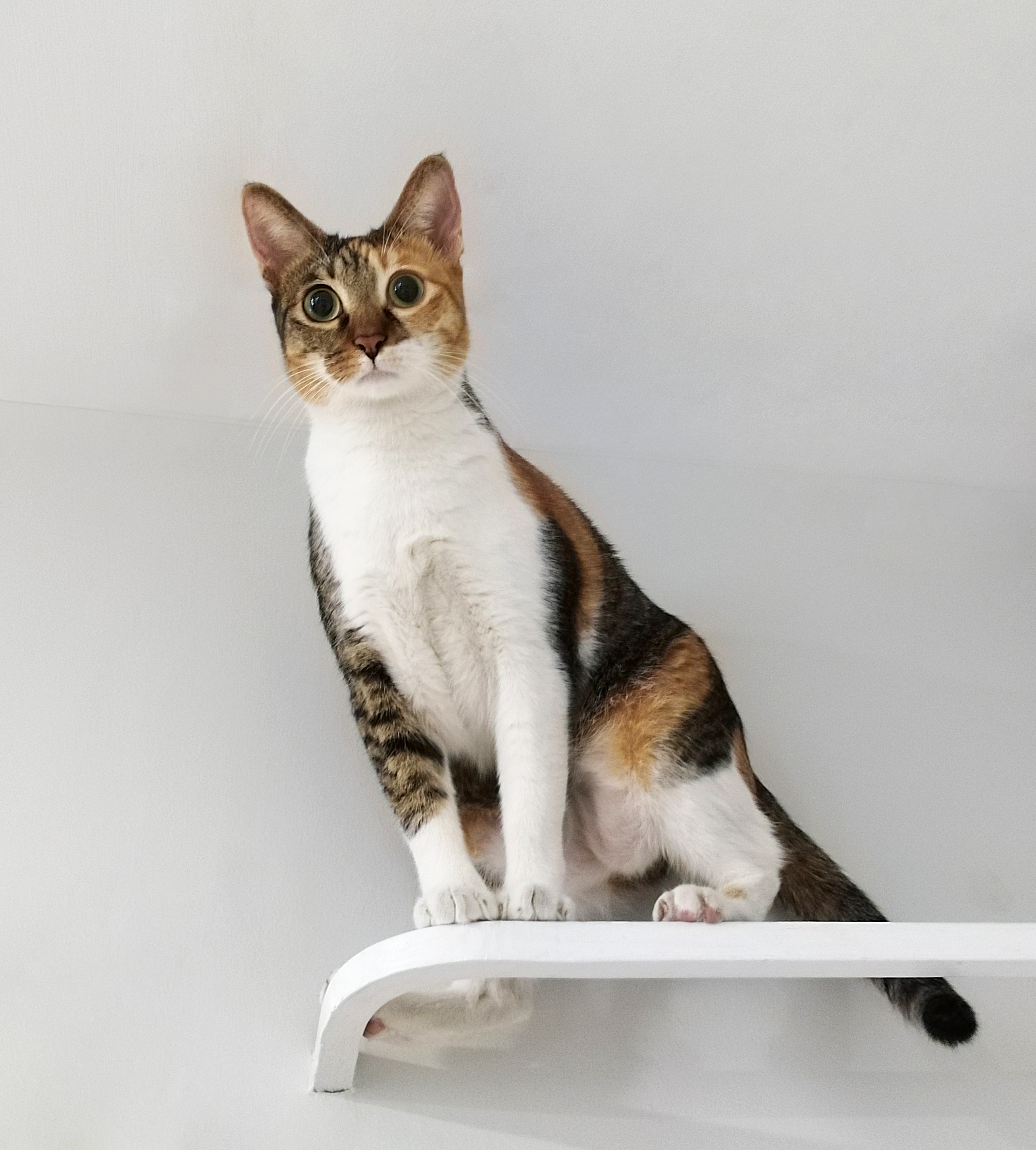
Calico cat with tabby markings (Caliby/Tabico)

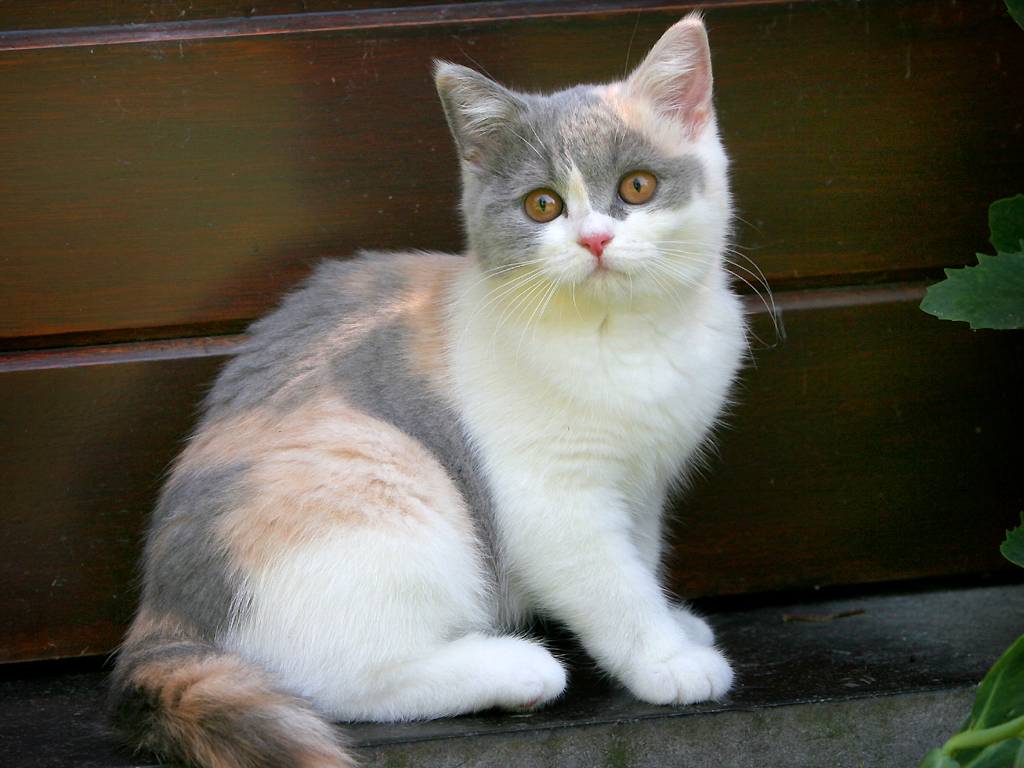
Calico cat of blue (diluted) tortoiseshell and white

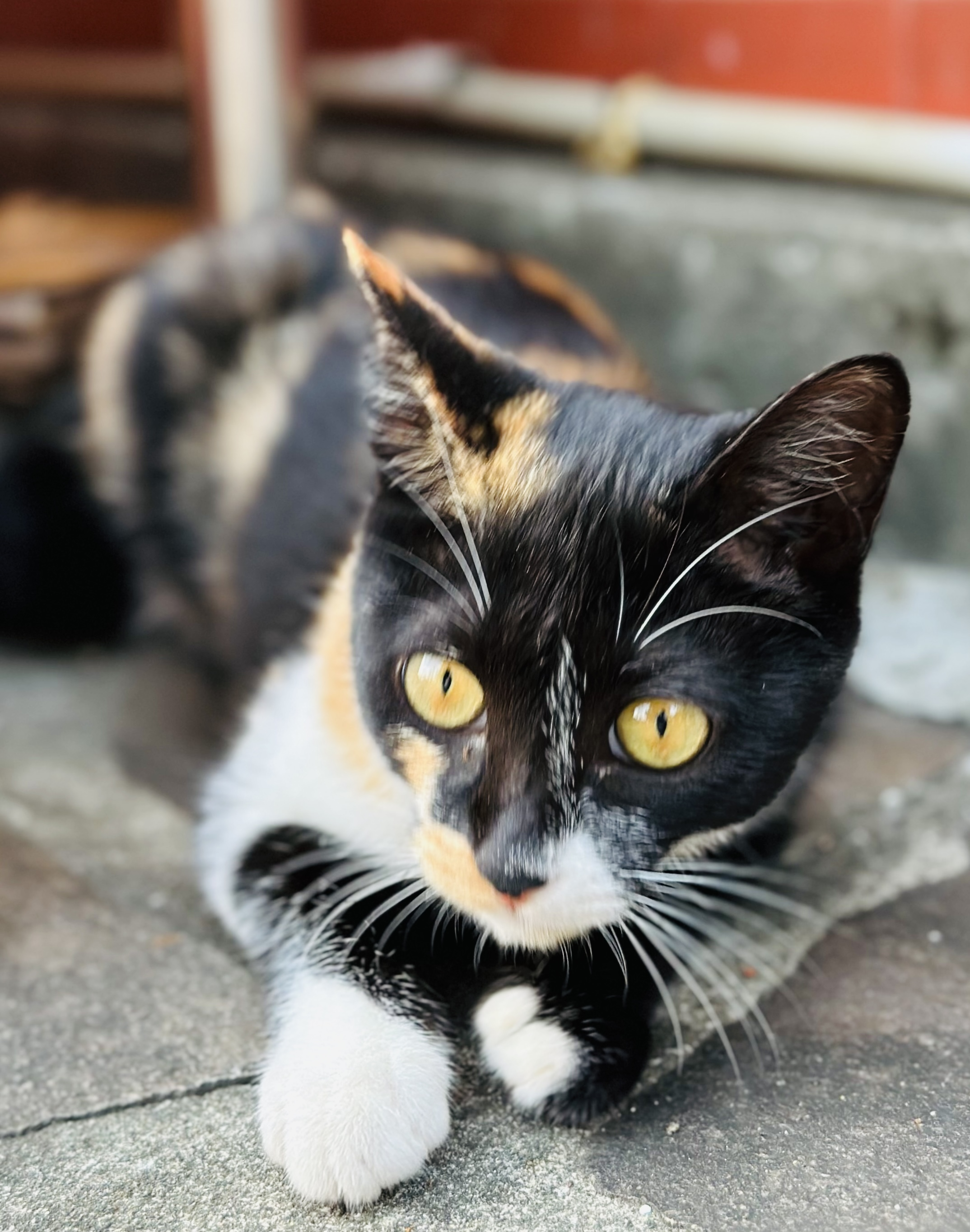
Calico cat with predominantly black coloration

A calico cat is a domestic cat of any breed with a tricolor coat of black-based and red-based pigments with white. Outside of North American English, this coat pattern is called tricolor or tortoiseshell and white.

Calico is not to be confused with a tortoiseshell, which is a bicolored coat of black-based and red-based pigments, without white markings. The calico cat is most commonly thought of as being 25% to 75% white with large orange and black patches; however, they may have other colors and patterns. Cats with diluted coloration (e.g. blue tortoiseshell and white) have colloquially been called calimanco or clouded tiger. (Note: In North American English) Occasionally, the tricolor calico coloration is combined with a tabby patterning, called tortoiseshell tabby (torbie/y) with white. A calico-patched tabby cat may colloquially be referred to as caliby or tabico.

Derived from a colorful printed calico fabric, (Note: "Calico" fabric refers to the design in the US, but only to plain fabric in the UK.) when the term "calico" is applied to cats, it refers only to a color pattern of the fur, not to a cat breed or any reference to any other traits, such as their eyes. Breed standards set by cat registries limit the breeds among which they permit registration of cats with calico coloration. (Note: Those breeds are the Manx cat, American Shorthair, Maine Coon, British Shorthair, Persian cat, Arabian Mau, Japanese Bobtail, Exotic Shorthair, Siberian, Turkish Van, Turkish Angora, and the Norwegian Forest Cat.) Calico cats are almost exclusively female except under rare genetic conditions, e.g. in the case of chimerism or Klinefelter syndrome.

== History ==
=== Etymology ===
The fabric called "calico" was originally from the city of Calicut in southwestern India. Printed calico was imported into the United States from Lancashire, England, in the 1780s, and a linguistic separation occurred there. While Europe maintained the word "calico" for the fabric, in the US it was used to refer to the printed design or pattern. These colorful, small-patterned printed fabrics gave rise to the use of the word "calico" to describe a cat coat of tricolor; "calico" as an adjective being synonymous to "mottled" or "resembling printed calico".

=== Origin ===
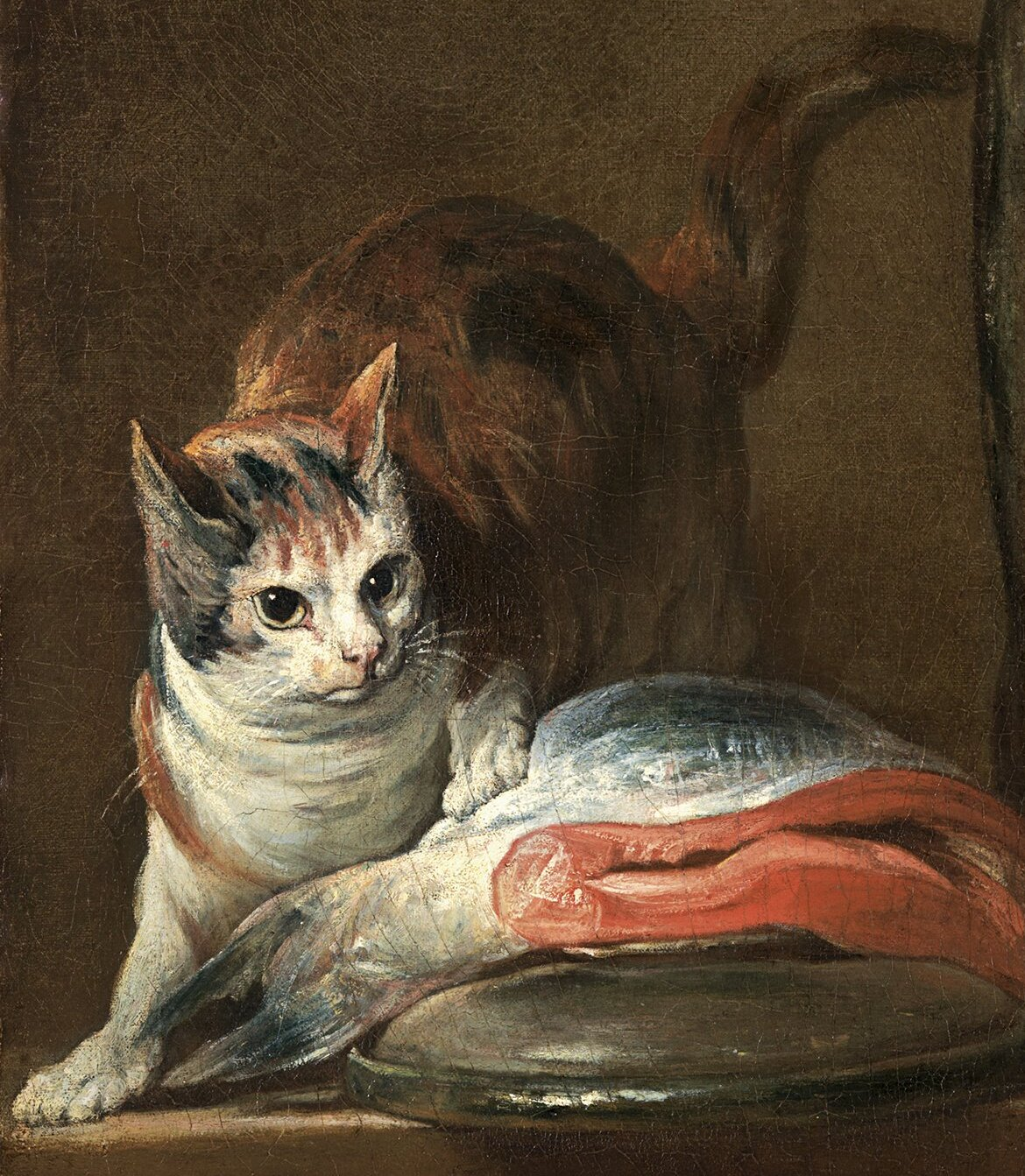
Detail from Still life with Cat and fish by Jean Siméon Chardin, 1728

The tricolor coat characteristic of calico cats does not define any breed, but occurs incidentally in cats that display a range of color patterns. Accordingly, the effect has no definitive historical background. However, the existence of patches in calico cats was traced to a certain degree by Neil Todd in a study determining the migration of domesticated cats along trade routes in Europe and North Africa. The proportion of cats having the orange mutant gene found in calico cats was traced to the port cities along the Mediterranean in Greece, France, Spain, and Italy, originating from Egypt.

=== Maryland, US, state cat ===
The calico has been the state cat of Maryland, USA, since 1 October 2001. Calico cats were chosen as the state cat because their white, black, and orange coloring is in harmony with the coloring of the Baltimore oriole (the state bird) and the Baltimore checkerspot butterfly (the state insect).

== Genetics ==
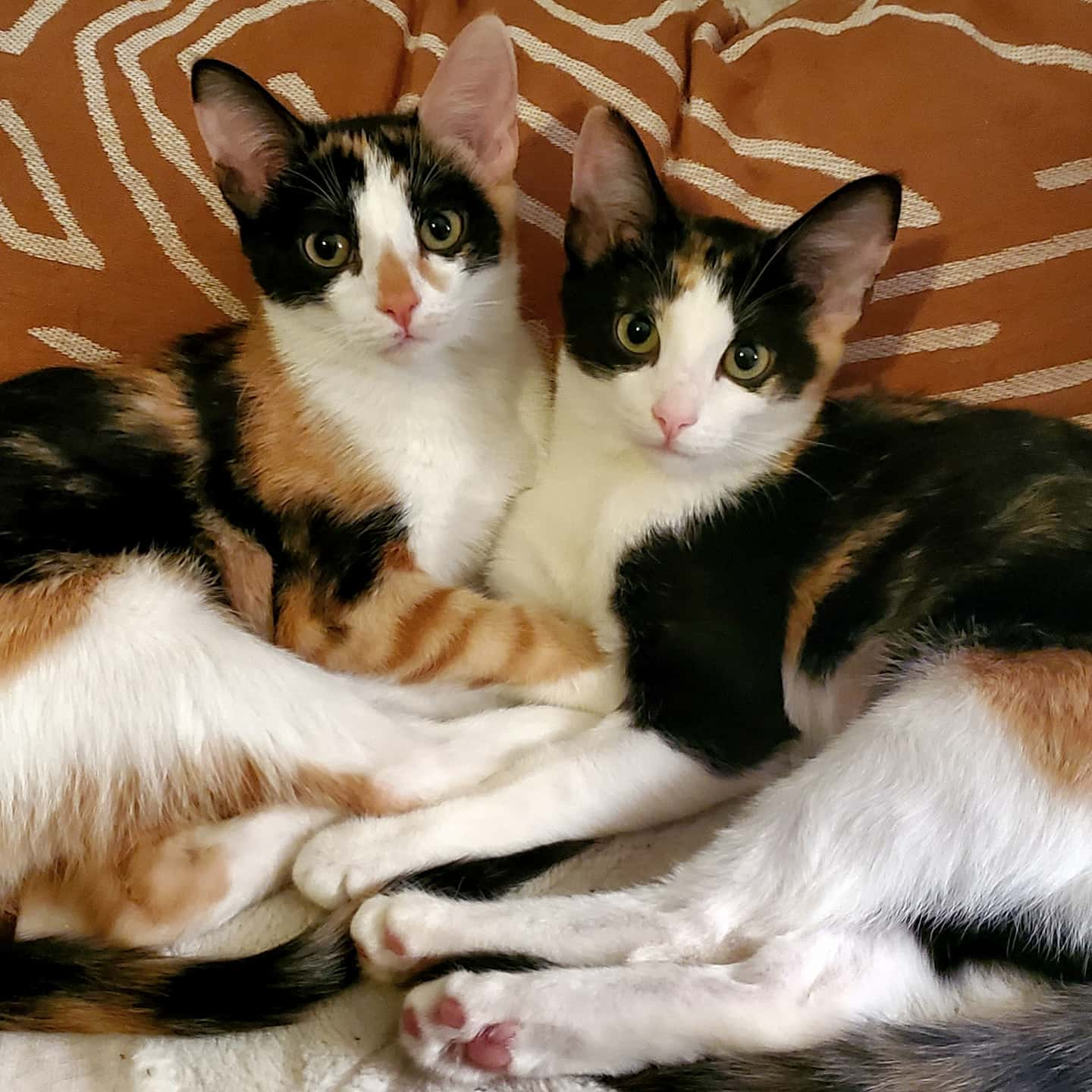
Calico cat sisters, demonstrating the variation in their coat patterns

In genetic terms, calico cats resemble tortoiseshells in most ways, except that the tortoiseshell has no white spotting (piebald). One anomaly is that, as a rule of thumb, the larger the areas of white, the fewer and larger the patches of ginger and dark or tabby coat. In contrast, a non-white-spotted tortoiseshell usually has small patches of color or even something resembling a salt-and-pepper sprinkling. This reflects the genetic effects on relative speeds of migration of melanocytes and X-inactivation in the embryo.

Serious study of calico cats apparently began in 1948 when Murray Barr and his graduate student E. G. Bertram noticed dark, drumstick-shaped masses inside the nuclei of nerve cells of female cats, but not in male cats. These dark masses became known as Barr bodies. In 1959, Japanese cell biologist Susumu Ohno determined the Barr bodies were X chromosomes. In 1961, Mary Lyon proposed the concept of X-inactivation: when one of the two X chromosomes inside a female mammal shuts off. She observed this in the coat color patterns of mice. There are two different alleles in calico cats, one received from each parent, that can determine their fur coloration: each allele is responsible for either orange or black fur. Typically, each allele received would create a solid coat of black and orange fur, but with calico cats X-inactivation occurs at random, which makes for the very distinct fur coat.

Calico cats are almost always female because the locus of the gene for the orange/non-orange coloring is on the X chromosome. In the absence of other influences, such as color inhibition that causes white fur, the alleles present in those orange loci determine whether the fur is orange or not. Female cats, like all female placental mammals, normally have two X chromosomes. In contrast, male placental mammals, including chromosomally stable male cats, have one X and one Y chromosome. Since the Y chromosome does not have any locus for the orange gene, it is not possible for a normal XY male cat to have both orange and non-orange genes together, which is what typically results in tortoiseshell or calico coloring. One rare genetic exception resulting in a male calico occurs when faulty cell division leaves an extra X chromosome in one of the gametes that produced the male cat. That extra X then is reproduced in each of his cells, a condition referred to as XXY, or Klinefelter syndrome, a condition that can negatively impact the cat's health and reduce its lifespan, also ultimately affecting a male cat's ability to father kittens. Such a combination of chromosomes could produce tortoiseshell or calico markings in the affected male, in the same way as XX chromosomes produce them in the female. All but approximately one in ten thousand of the rare calico or tortoiseshell male cats are sterile because of the chromosome abnormality, and breeders reject any exceptions for stud purposes because they generally are of poor physical quality and fertility. Even in the rare cases where a male calico is healthy and fertile, most cat registries will not accept them as show animals.

Male calico cats with Klinefelter syndrome often have behavioral problems such as being antisocial; this is caused by poor cognition and developmental issues. Cats with this chromosome abnormality tend to have poor muscle development that leads to a high risk of broken bones, and it is common for these cats to have a feminine appearance despite being male. Some other effects the syndrome may cause are urinary tract infections and a high amount of body fat, which leads to heart disease, diabetes, and joint pain. Not all male cats with the syndrome are guaranteed to have all the medical issues listed above.

As Sue Hubble stated in her book Shrinking the Cat: Genetic Engineering Before We Knew About Genes,

The mutation that gives male cats a ginger-colored coat and females ginger, tortoiseshell, or calico coats produced a particularly telling map. The orange mutant gene is found only on the X, or female, chromosome. As with humans, female cats have paired sex chromosomes, XX, and male cats have XY sex chromosomes. The female cat, therefore, can have the orange mutant gene on one X chromosome and the gene for a black coat on the other. The piebald gene is on a different chromosome. If expressed, this gene codes for white, or no color, and is dominant over the alleles that code for a certain color (i.e. orange or black), making the white spots on calico cats. If that is the case, those several genes will be expressed in a blotchy coat of the tortoiseshell or calico kind. But the male, with his single X chromosome, has only one of that particular coat-color gene: he can be not-ginger or he can be ginger (although some modifier genes can add a bit of white here and there), but unless he has a chromosomal abnormality he cannot be a calico cat.

Currently, it has been very difficult to reproduce the fur patterns of calico cats by cloning. This is shown in the case of CC, whose genetic donor, Rainbow, was a calico domestic longhair. Copy Cat and Rainbow had different fur patterns.

The study of calico cats may have provided significant findings relating to physiological differences between female and male mammals.

== Folklore ==
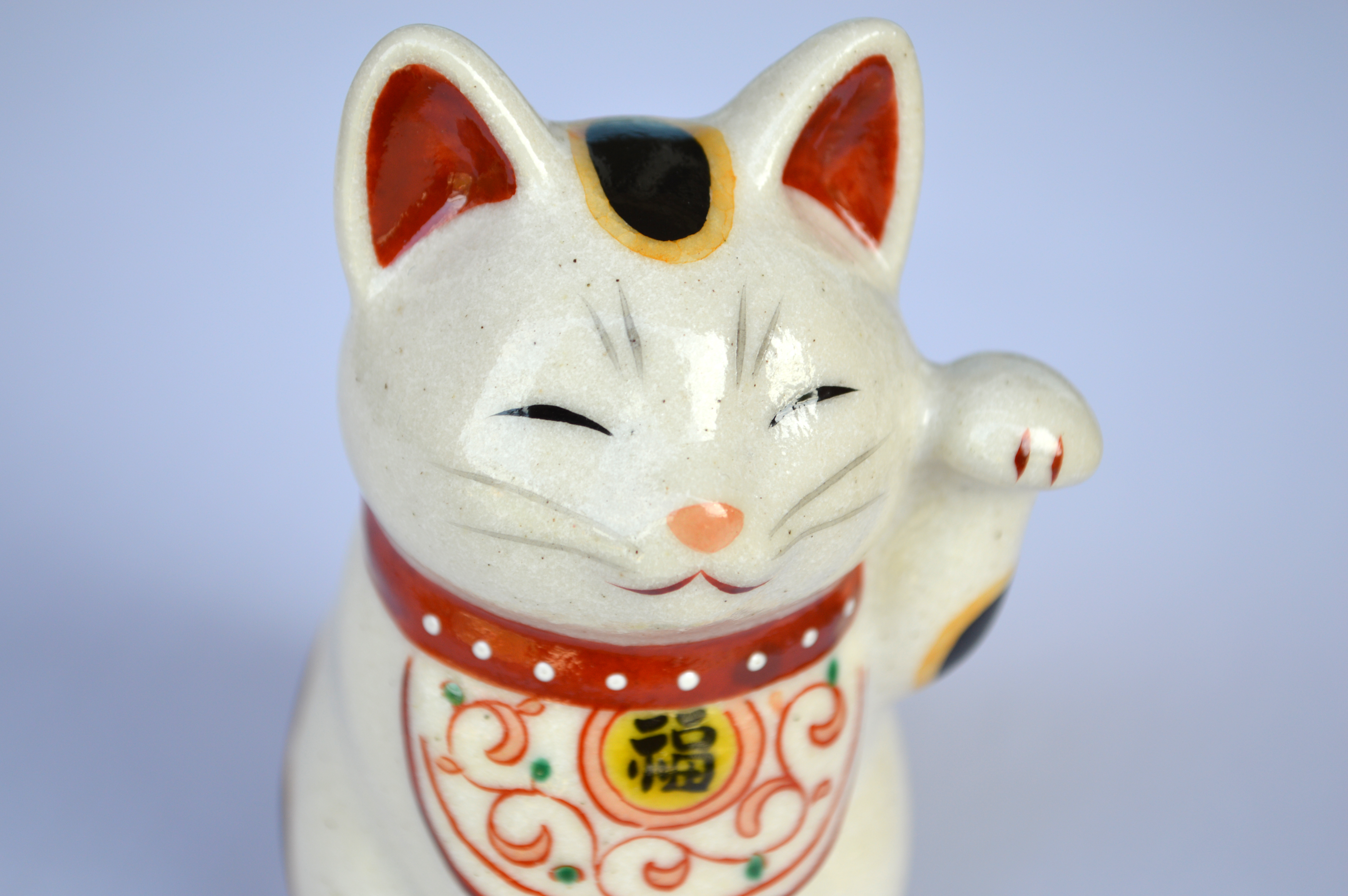
A maneki-neko with calico coloring

Cats with calico coloration are believed to bring good luck in the folklore of many cultures. The German word for a cat with calico coloring is "Glückskatze", meaning "lucky cat". In the United States, such cats are sometimes referred to as money cats. In Japan, Maneki-neko figures depict calico cats, bringing good luck. Japanese sailors often kept a calico as their ship's cat to protect against misfortune at sea.

== Literature ==
In the late nineteenth century, Eugene Field published "The Duel", a poem for children also known as "The Gingham Dog and the Calico Cat".

== See also ==
- Bicolor cat
- Brindle
- Cat coat genetics
- Deaf white cat
- Maltese cat
- Point coloration
- Calico sheep
