= Gōtoku-ji =

Buddhist temple in Setagaya, Tokyo, Japan

- 豪徳寺
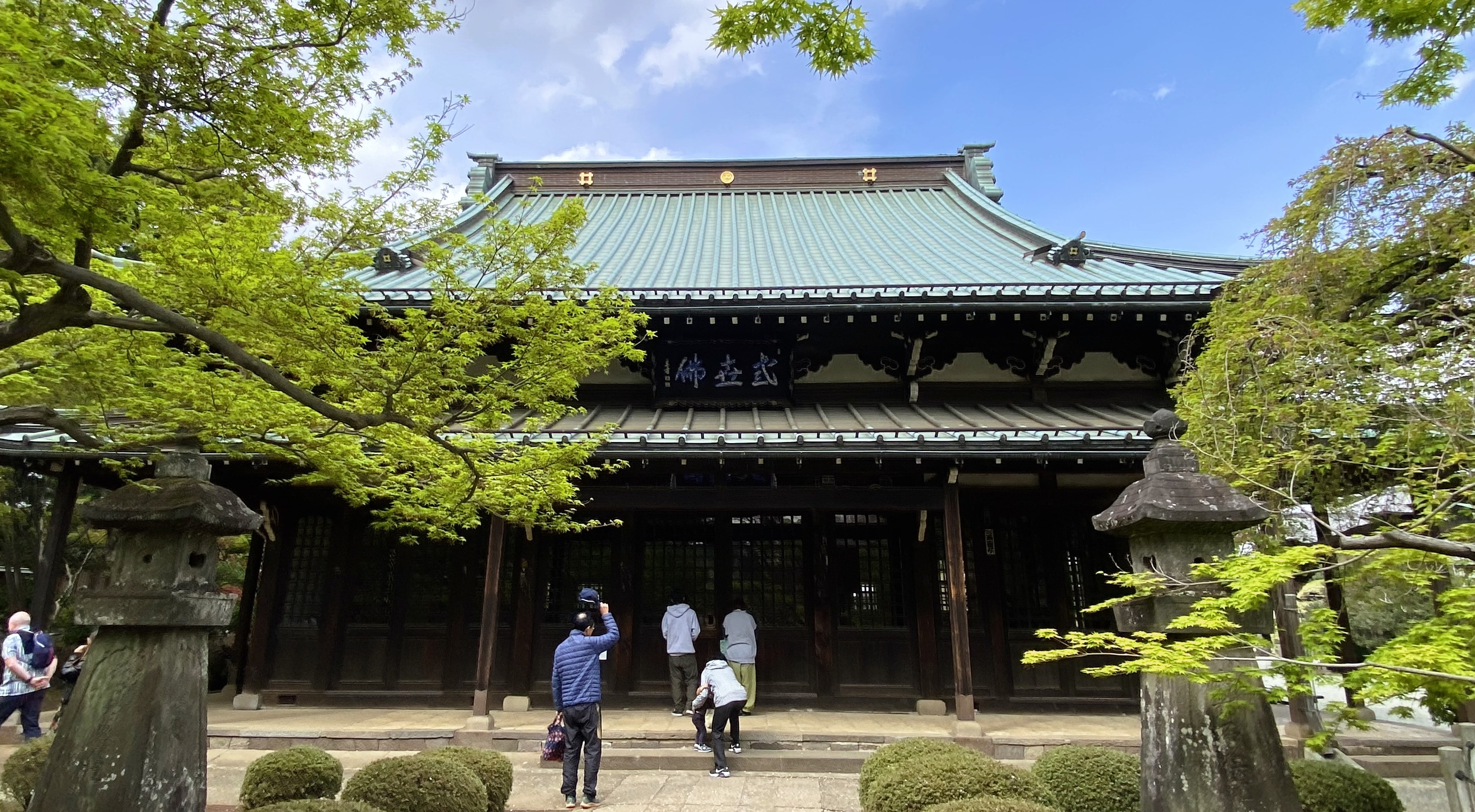
- The butsu-den built in 1677

- Location within Special wards of Tokyo

Religion
- Affiliation: Buddhism
- Status: Active

Location
- Location: Gōtokuji, Setagaya, Tokyo
- Country: Japan
- Coordinates: 35°38′55.6″N 139°38′50.7″E

Architecture
- Completed: 1480

Daikeizan Gōtoku-ji (大谿山 豪徳寺) is a Buddhist temple located in the Gōtokuji district of Setagaya ward, Tokyo, Japan. Gōtoku-ji is a Sōtō Zen temple and served as the Bodai-ji (bodhi temple) of the Ii clan, who were lords of the Hikone Domain, in Edo period.

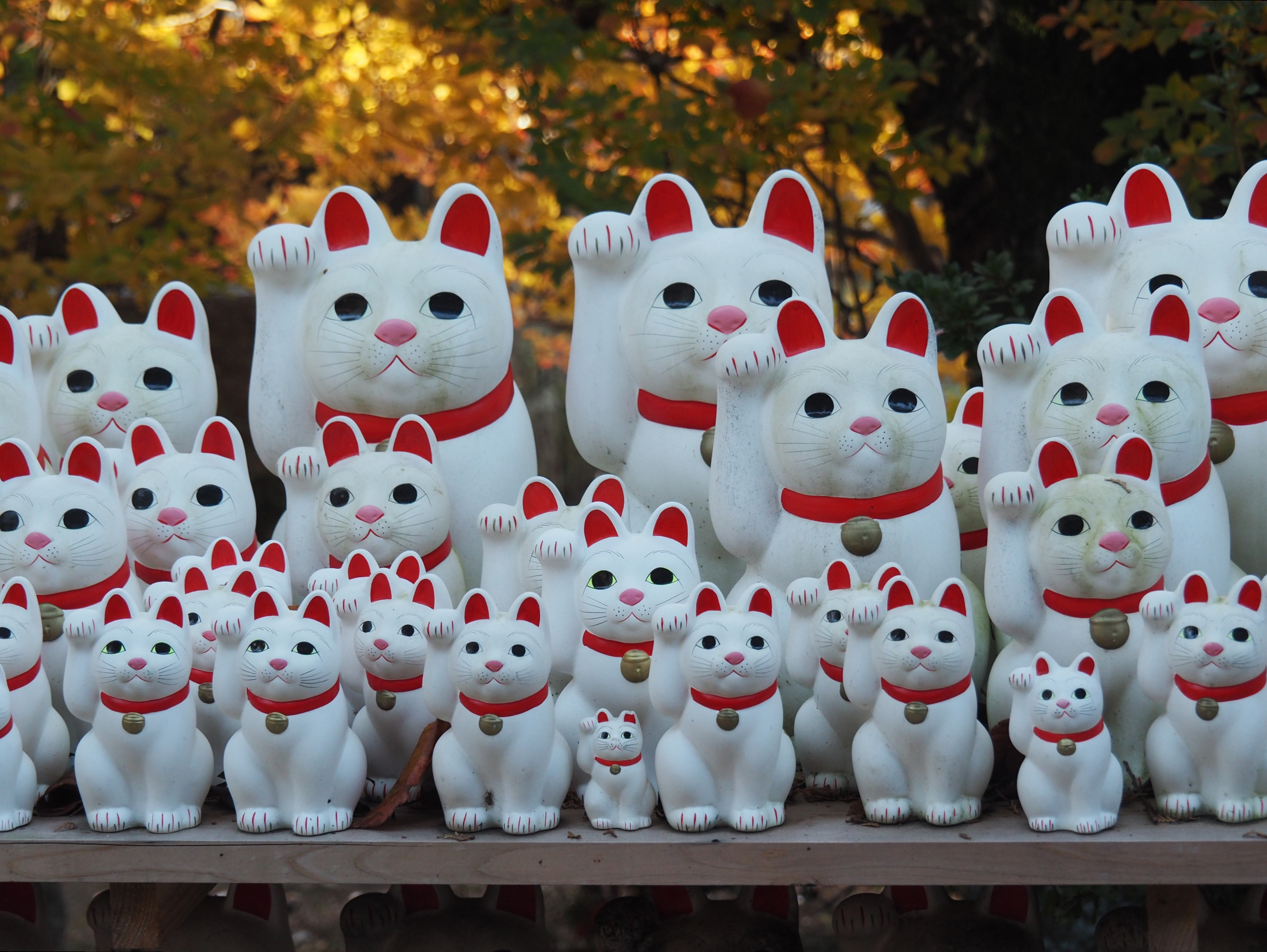
Maneki-neko figurines

It is known as the "cat temple" because of the maneki-neko.

Gōtoku-ji was established as Kōtoku-in in 1480, and was renamed "Edo Bodaiji" when the entire region came under the ownership of the Hikone Domain in 1633. In 1659, it was renamed Gōtoku-ji after the posthumous Buddhist name of the domain's second feudal lord, Ii Naotaka.

The precincts contain the tombs of successive feudal lords of the Ii clan and their wives, including the grave of Ii Naosuke, the 13th head of the Ii clan who also served as a rōjū in the Tokugawa shogunate.

== See also ==
- Neko-dera
