= Calico sheep =

Sheep with more than one colour within its coat

Calico sheep is a type of sheep that has more than one colour within its coat. The colouring is due to a piebald mutation, but the calico sheep is not a recognized breed.

These sheep tend to be very small due to intensive inbreeding and are often mislabeled as a true breed. Rather, they are mere crossbred sheep that have interesting colour patterns.

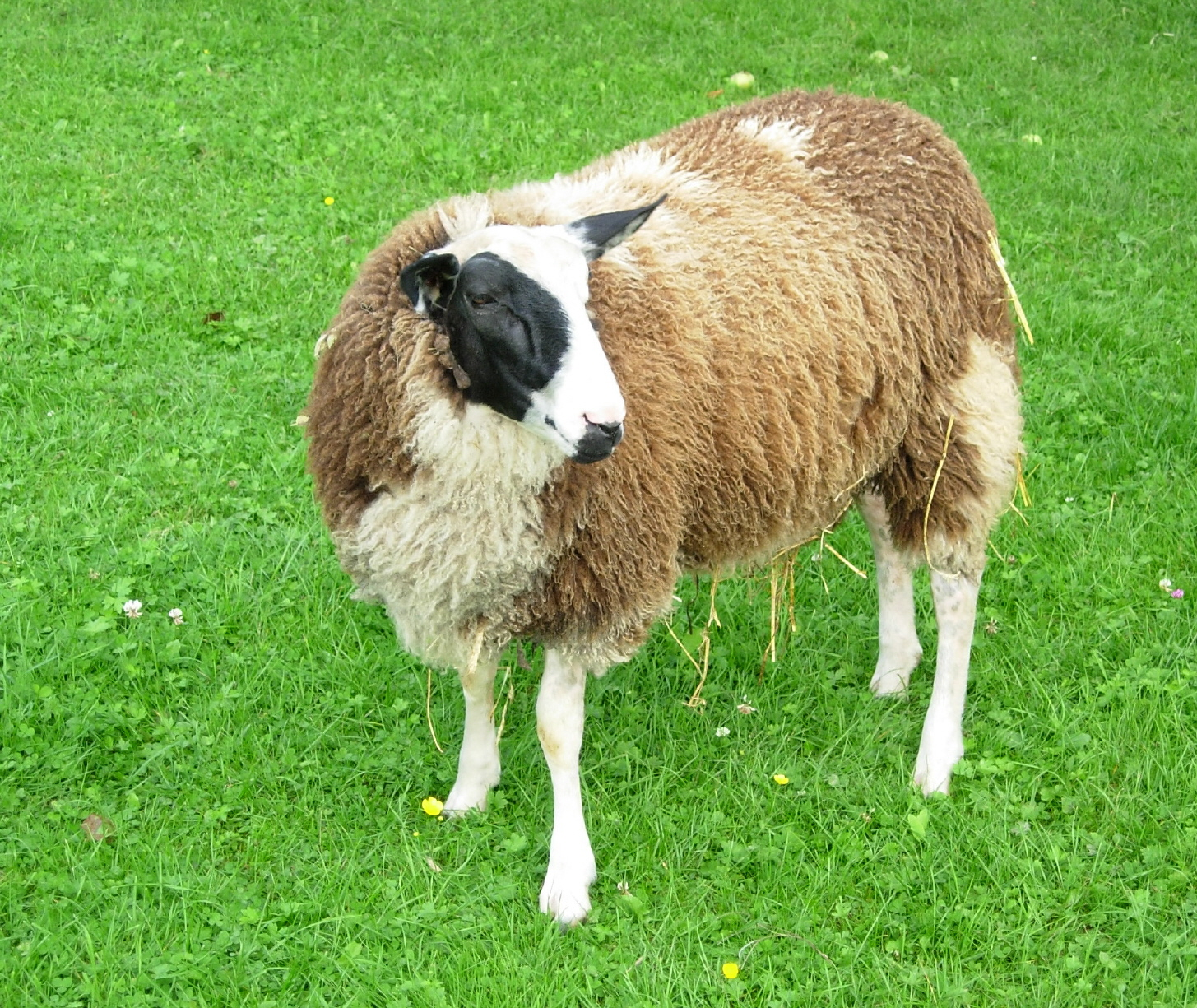
Calico Sheep

== Genetics ==
The calico mutation is due to an autosomal recessive gene, first reported by Roberts.

== History ==
Calico sheep are not related to the black and white sheep that are native to ancient Sudan and to South Africa.

The modern mutation was developed by breeding Shetland sheep with Barbados Blackbelly Sheep.

== See also ==
- Calico cat
