= Maneki-neko =

Japanese figurine of a beckoning cat

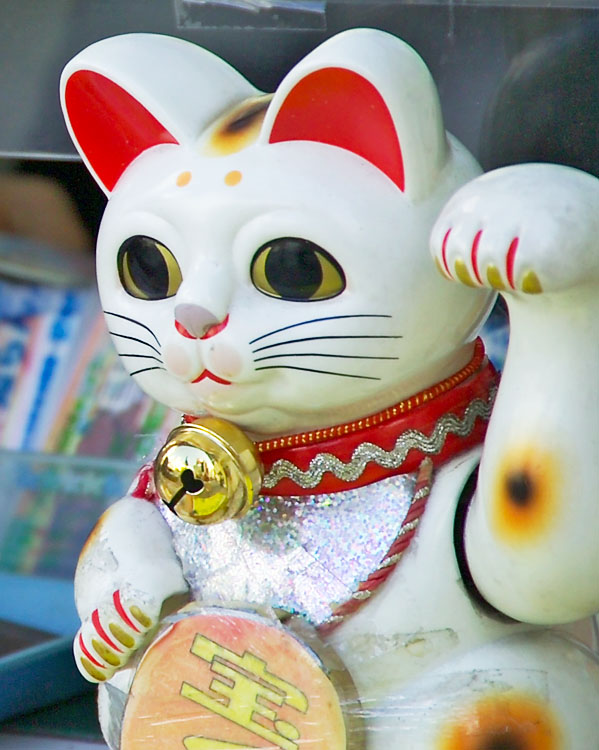
Maneki-neko with motorized arm beckons customers to buy lottery tickets in Tokyo, Japan

The maneki-neko (招き猫, lit. 'beckoning cat') is a common Japanese figurine which is often believed to bring good luck to the owner. In modern times, they are usually made of ceramic or plastic. The figurine depicts a cat, traditionally a calico Japanese Bobtail, with a paw raised in a beckoning gesture. The figurines are often displayed in shops, restaurants, pachinko parlors, dry cleaners, laundromats, bars, casinos, hotels, nightclubs, and other businesses, generally near the entrance, as well as households. Some maneki-neko are equipped with a mechanical paw that slowly moves back and forth.

Maneki-neko come in different colors and styles and vary in degrees of detail. Common colors are white, black, red, and gold. In addition to statues, maneki-neko can be found in the form of keychains, piggy banks, air fresheners, pots, and numerous other media and merchandise. Maneki-neko are sometimes referred to simply as "lucky cats" or "calling cats".

== Common features ==
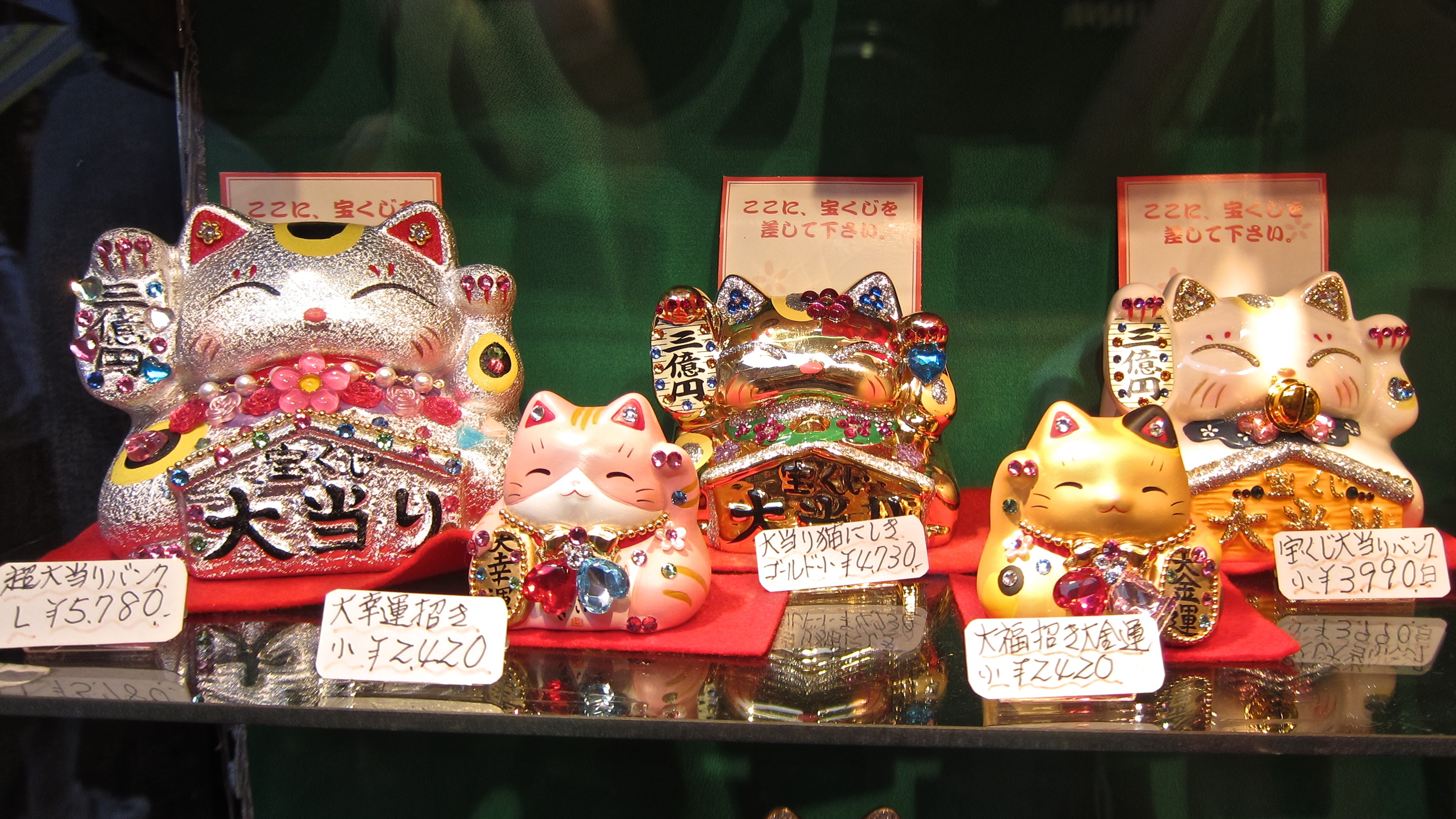
Maneki-neko in a shop, Japan

Maneki-neko are traditionally depicted seated, holding a koban coin, with one paw raised in a beckoning gesture. This may be confused for a waving gesture by non-locals. The typical Japanese beckoning gesture is made by holding up the hand, palm down, and repeatedly folding the fingers down and back, thus the cat's appearance. Some maneki-neko made specifically for western markets will have the cat's paw facing upwards, in a more familiar beckoning gesture.

Maneki-neko can be found with either the right or left paw raised (and sometimes both). The significance of the right and left raised paw differs with time and place. A statue with the left paw raised is to get more customers, while the right paw raised is to get more money. Hence it is also said that the one with left paw is for business and the right is for home.

Battery- and solar-powered maneki-neko are a modern iteration. Those sources power a simple circuit that regulates a current going through a coil, whose electromagnetic field subsequently "pushes" a magnet mounted to the end of the waving arm.

=== Composition ===
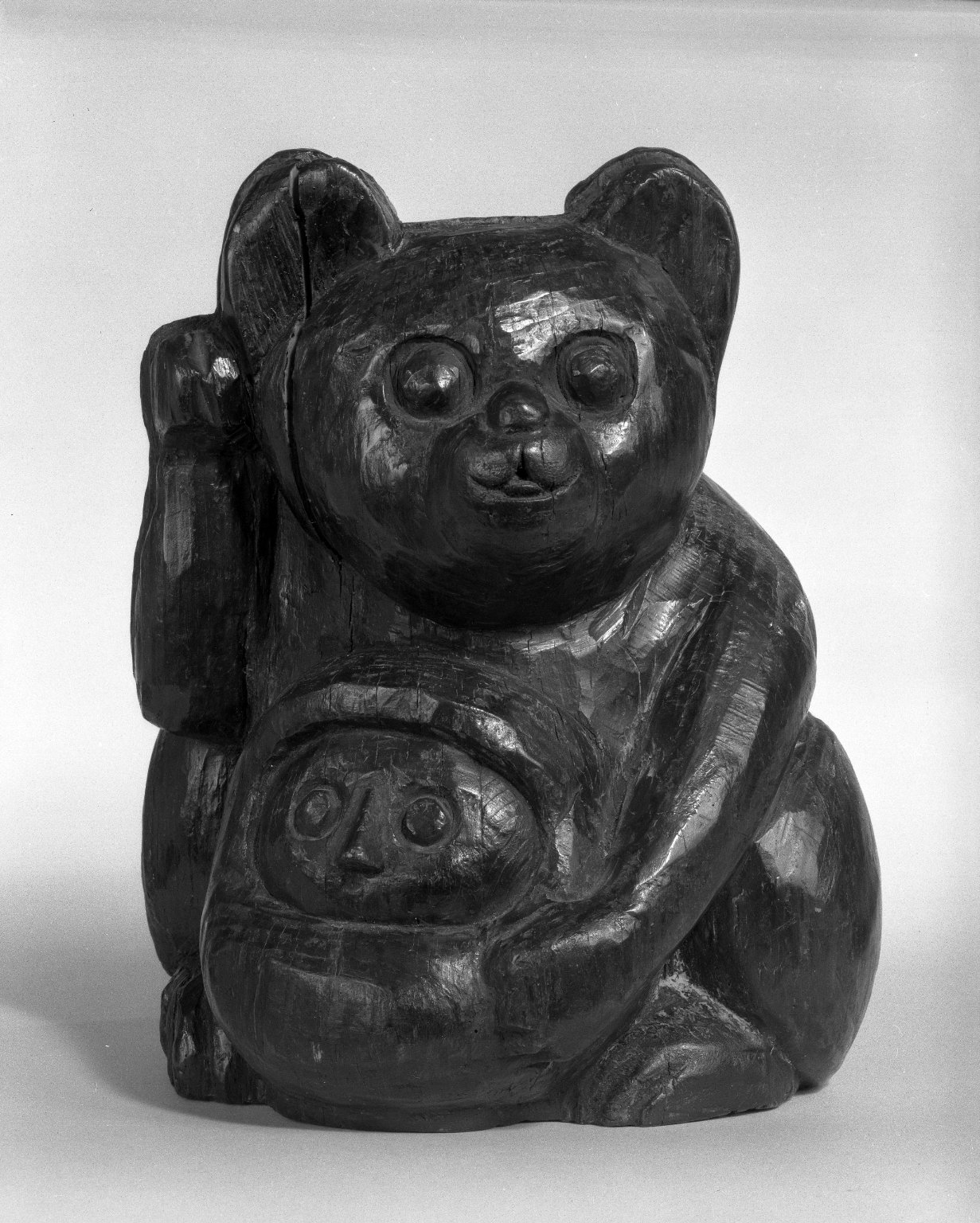
A wooden mold for a maneki-neko and Okiagari-Koboshi Daruma doll from the Edo period, 18th century. Brooklyn Museum.

Antique examples of maneki-neko may be made of carved wood, stone and metal, handmade porcelain or cast iron.

=== Colors ===
Originally, maneki-neko were white, but over the years with the combination of Feng Shui, different color variations appeared. The original white color is to get good luck and overall good fortune, while black is to ward off evil, red is for good health, yellow or gold is for wealth, and pink is for romance.

== History ==
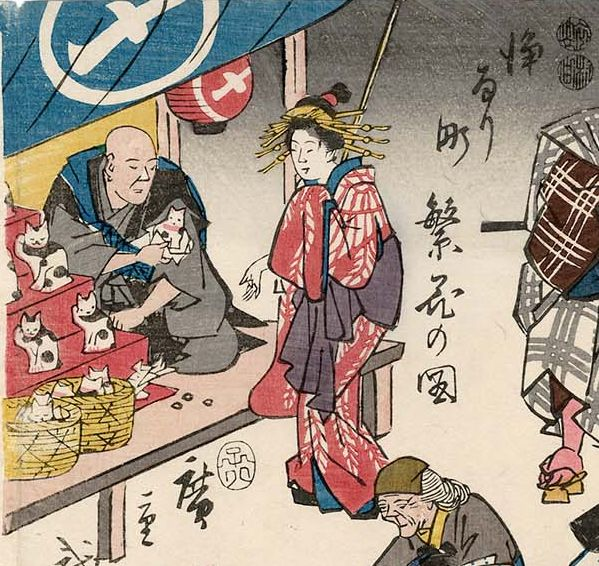
"Joruri-machi Hanka no zu" by Utagawa Hiroshige, 1852

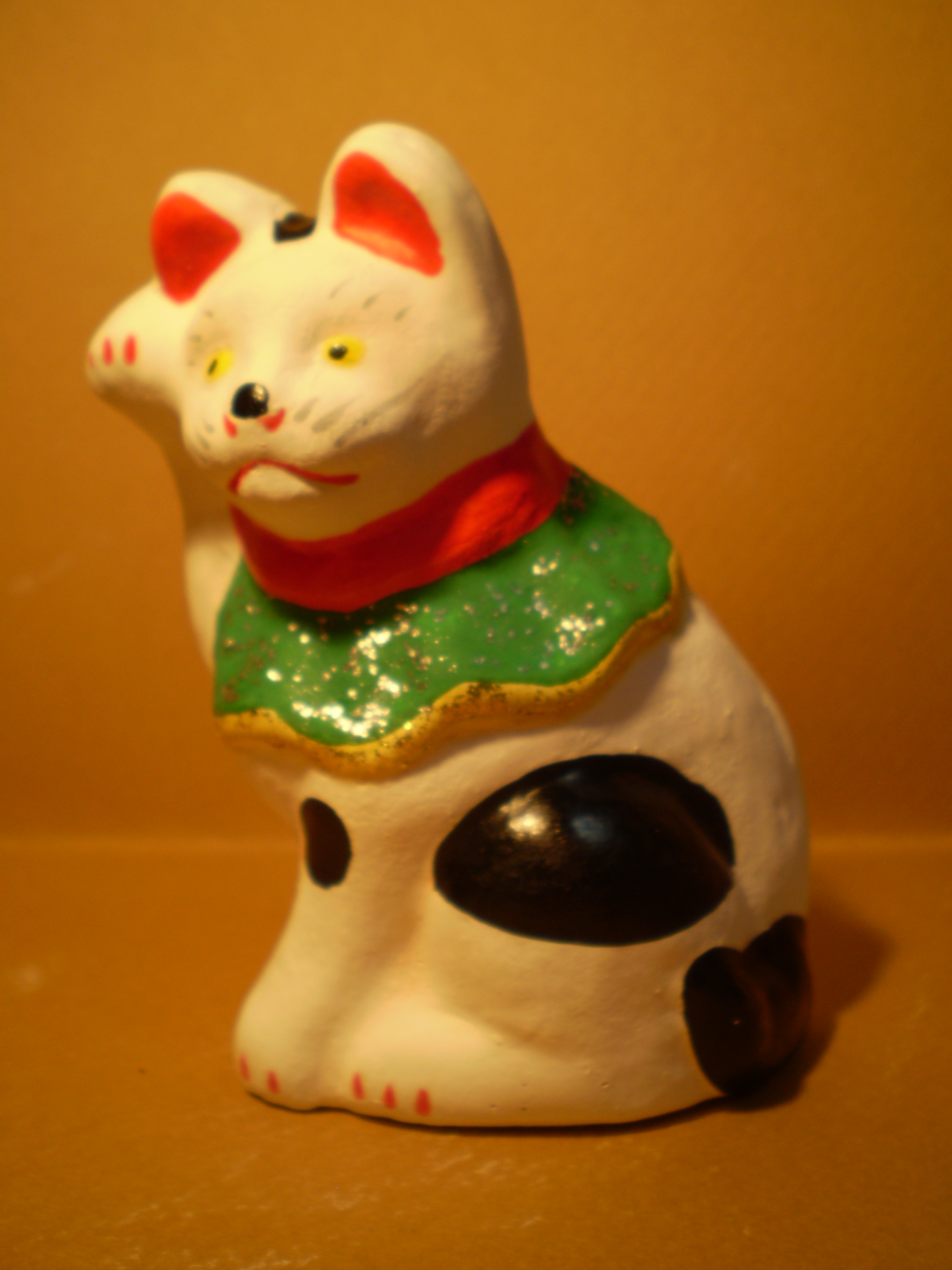
Marushime-neko, a variation of maneki-neko made of Imado ware in the style of the Kaei and Ansei periods of the Edo period

It is commonly believed that maneki-neko originated in Tokyo (then named Edo) or, sometimes, Kyoto. It is a common theory that maneki-neko as figurines originated from Imado ware sold in Asakusa during the Edo period (1603–1868). During the Tenshō era (1573–1592) of the Azuchi-Momoyama period (1573–1592), clay suitable for pottery was discovered in Imado in Asakusa, and local people began to make Imado ware. In the Edo period, potters from the Mikawa Province moved to Imado in Asakusa and further developed Imado ware, and in the Genroku era (1688–1704), Imado dolls were made, which is thought to have given rise to maneki-neko. The earliest known record of maneki-neko as figurines is the marushime-neko, a variation of maneki-neko made of Imado ware in the late Edo period.

One of the earliest records of maneki-neko appear in the Bukō nenpyō's (a chronology of Edo) entry dated 1852. Utagawa Hiroshige's ukiyo-e "Joruri-machi Hanka no zu," painted also in 1852, depicts the marushime-neko, a variation of maneki-neko, being sold at Sensō-ji Temple, Tokyo. In 1876, during the Meiji era, it was mentioned in a newspaper article, and there is evidence that kimono-clad maneki-neko were distributed at a shrine in Osaka during this time. A 1902 advertisement for maneki-neko indicates that by the turn of the century they were popular.

There are a variety of tales in the folklore of Japan concerning the origin of maneki-neko. Several Buddhist temples and Shinto shrines that appear in folklore, such as Gōtoku-ji, Jishōin Shrine and Imado Shrine, are claimed to be the birthplace of the maneki-neko.

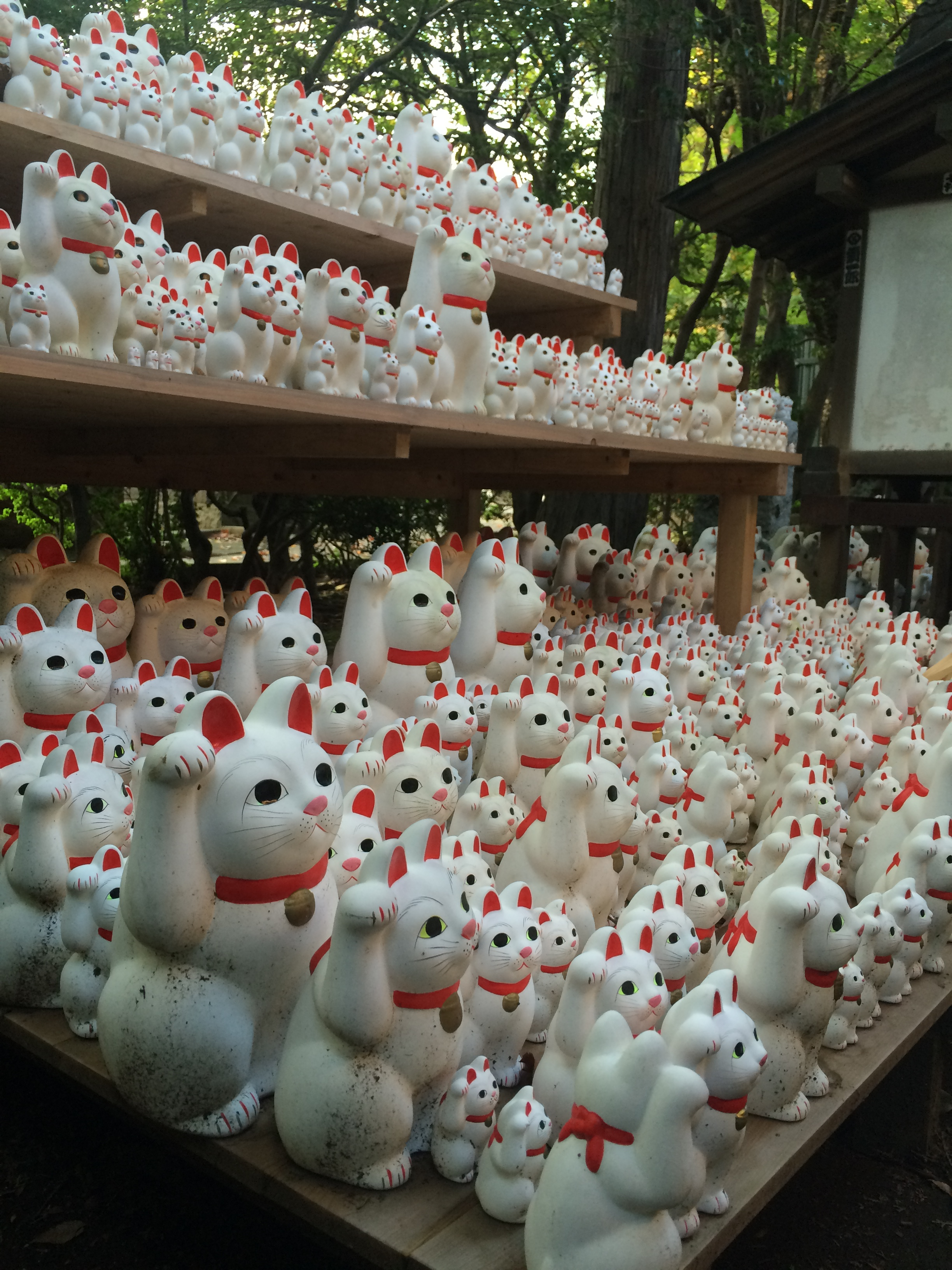
Many maneki-neko are enshrined in Gōtoku-ji Temple. The temple is famous for its folklore as the birthplace of maneki-neko.

The most famous folklore concerns Ii Naotaka during the Kan'ei era (1622–1624) of the Edo period. On their way back from the falconry, Naotaka's party stopped at Gōtoku-ji Temple to rest after being beckoned by a cat at the temple gate. A violent thunderstorm soon followed, and they marvelled at the cat's good fortune and thanked the temple priest for his hospitality. As a result, Gōtoku-ji became the family temple of the Ii clan, and the temple prospered under their patronage. In honour of the cat that brought prosperity to the temple, maneki-neko was created in later generations.

The second folklore concerns Ōta Dōkan, a warlord of the Muromachi period (1336–1573) who later became the first to build Edo Castle. During the Battles of Ekodahara and Numabukuro against the Toshima clan, Dōkan was outnumbered and lost his way. It was then that a cat appeared and beckoned him to enter the Jishōin Temple, where he was later able to turn the tide and win the war. Dōkan was so grateful to the cat that he donated a sculpture of the cat to the temple, and the maneki-neko was created in later generations.

The third folklore concerns an old woman who lived near the Imado Shrine. She had abandoned her cat out of poverty. One day, the cat came to her in a dream and told her that if she made an ornament of the cat, she would be blessed with good luck. The old woman made an ornament of the cat out of Imado ware, a local speciality, and sold it at the Asakusa Shrine, where it became very popular and made her rich, and the maneki-neko was created.

The fourth folklore concerns an oiran (courtesan) named Usugumo in Yoshiwara during the Genroku era of the Edo period. Usugumo was an oiran who worked in Miuraya and always carried a cat with her. People rumoured that Usugumo was a woman bewitched by a demonic cat, and the owner of Miuraya, believing the rumour, cut off the cat's head and killed it. The cat's severed head bit a giant snake lurking in the toilet, saving Usugumo's life. A regular customer gave Usugumo, who was grieving over the cat's death, a wooden carving in the shape of a cat, which was imitated and sold in Asakusa, giving rise to maneki-neko.

According to a folktale, the operator of an impoverished shop (or inn, tavern, temple, etc.) took in a starving stray cat despite barely having enough to feed himself. In gratitude, the cat sat in the front of the store beckoning customers, thus bringing prosperity as a reward to the charitable proprietor. Ever after, the "beckoning cat" has been a symbol of good luck for small business owners.

== Beliefs ==
Superstitions about the maneki-neko include it being able to "beckon...customers into shops" and "bring good fortune and prosperity into households", and it being an embodiment of "fertile, life-enhancing feline energies."

== In popular culture ==
Because of its popularity in Chinese communities (including Chinatowns in the United States), the maneki-neko is frequently mistaken for being Chinese in origin rather than Japanese, and is therefore sometimes referred to as a "Chinese lucky cat" or jīnmāo ("golden cat"). This cat is also prevalent in China domestically, and is usually referred to as simplified Chinese: 招财猫; traditional Chinese: 招財貓; pinyin: zhāocáimāo; Jyutping: ziu1 coi4 maau1.

Hikone City's mascot, Hikonyan, a famous mascot in Japan, was created based on the folklore of Ii Naotaka and the maneki-neko of Gōtoku-ji Temple. Hikone City is home to Hikone Castle, a National Treasure that was the base of the Ii clan for generations.

For the 2015 Trinidad and Tobago general election, won by the then opposition People's National Movement (PNM), a maneki-neko was utilized by the PNM in its campaign advertising days before election day, featuring a maneki-neko waving goodbye to then Prime Minister Kamla Persad-Bissessar alongside headlines of scandals linked to her People's Partnership administration taken from the front page of local newspapers.

The maneki-neko has appeared or been used as an inspiration in Japanese and international media, such as the Pokémon Meowth, Dandadan character Turbo Granny, and as a Joker in the roguelike deck-building game Balatro.

== Gallery ==
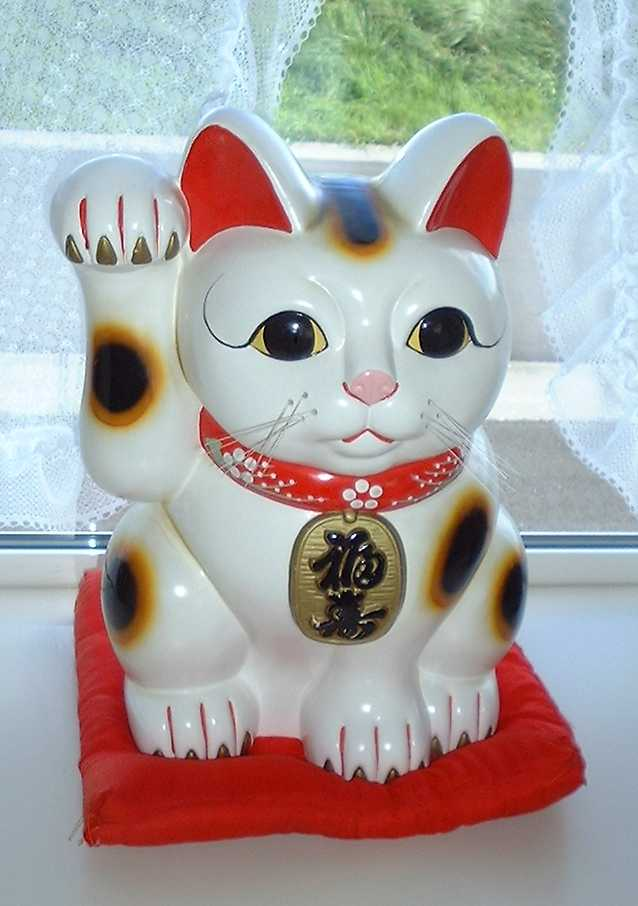

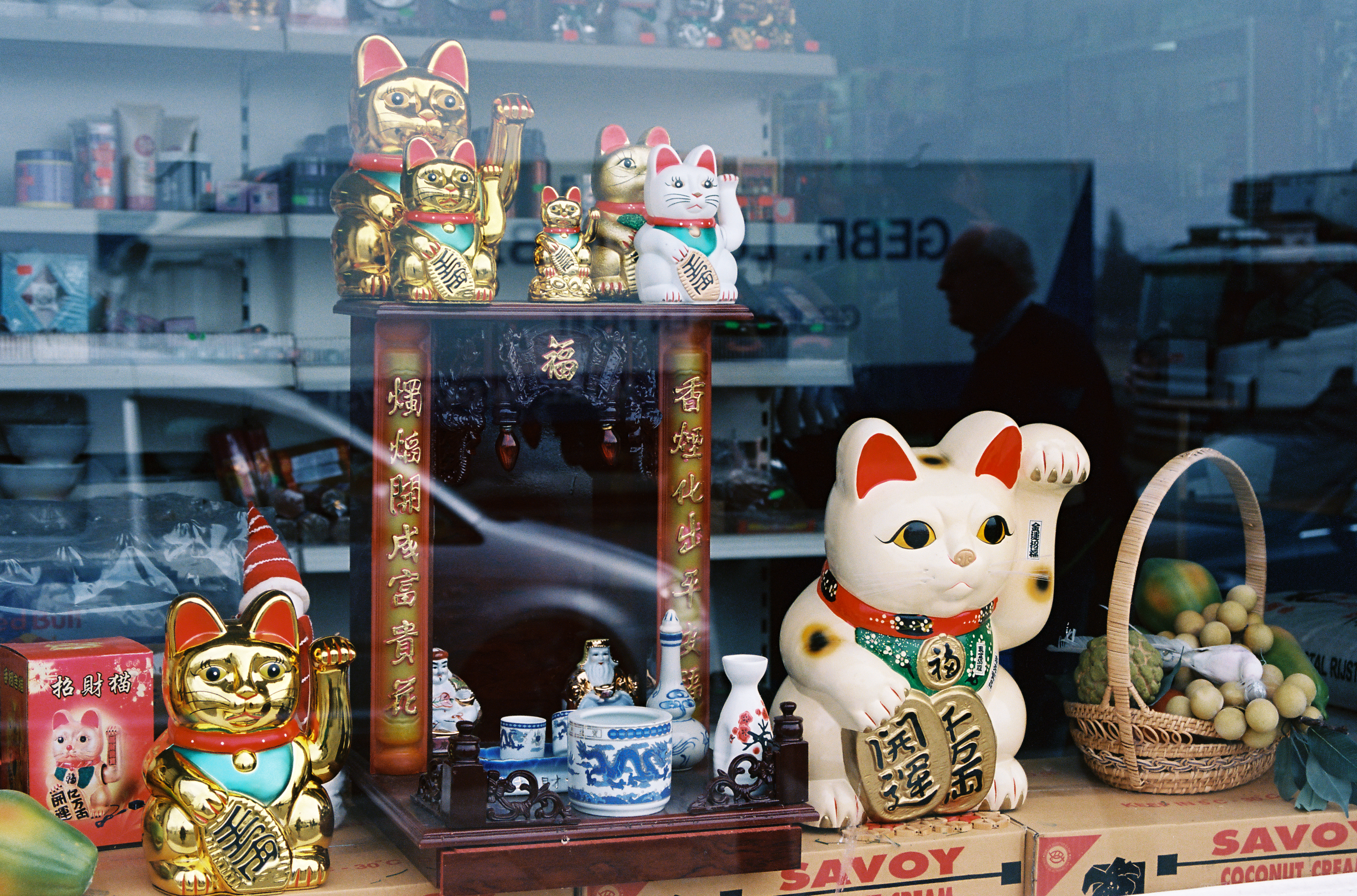

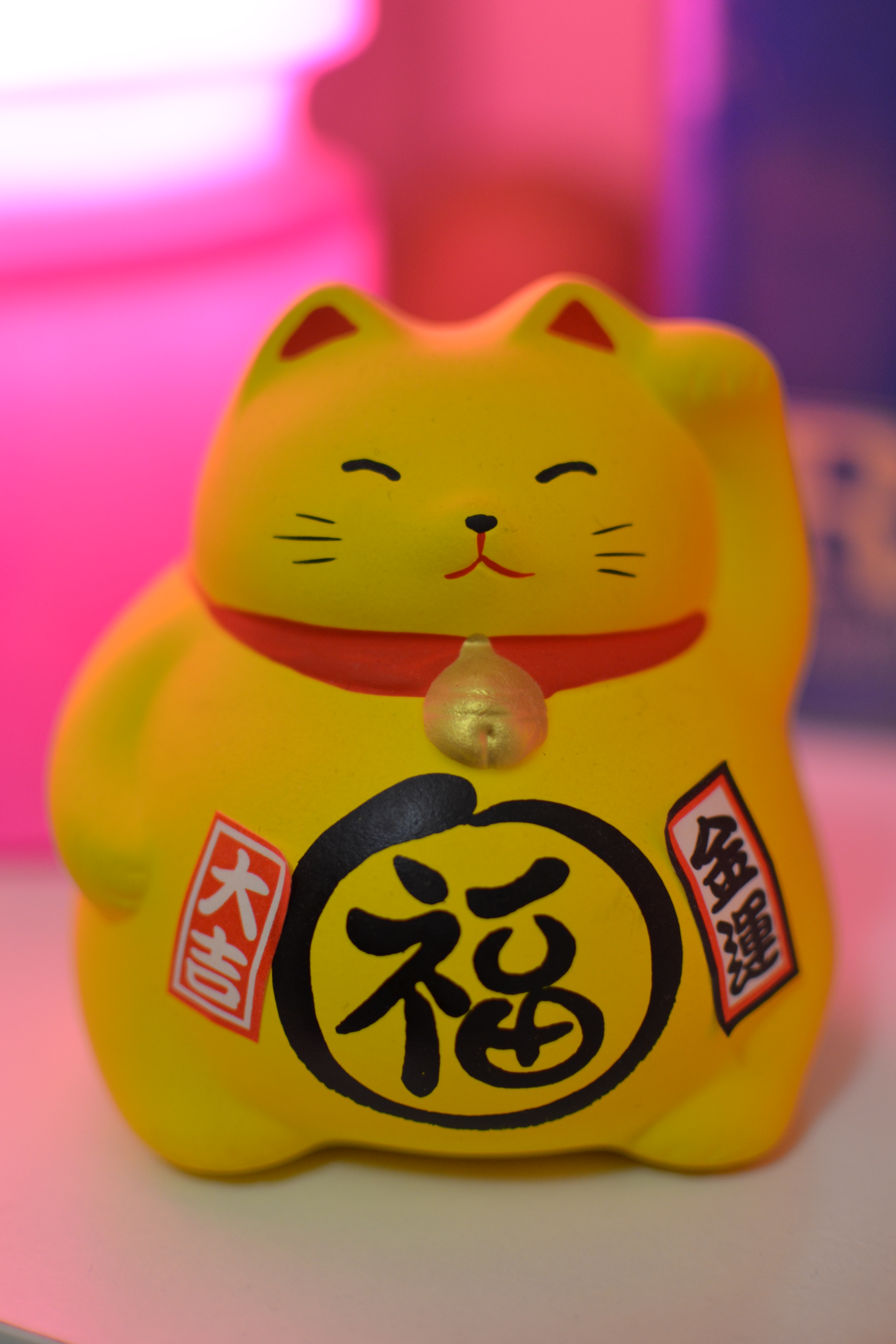

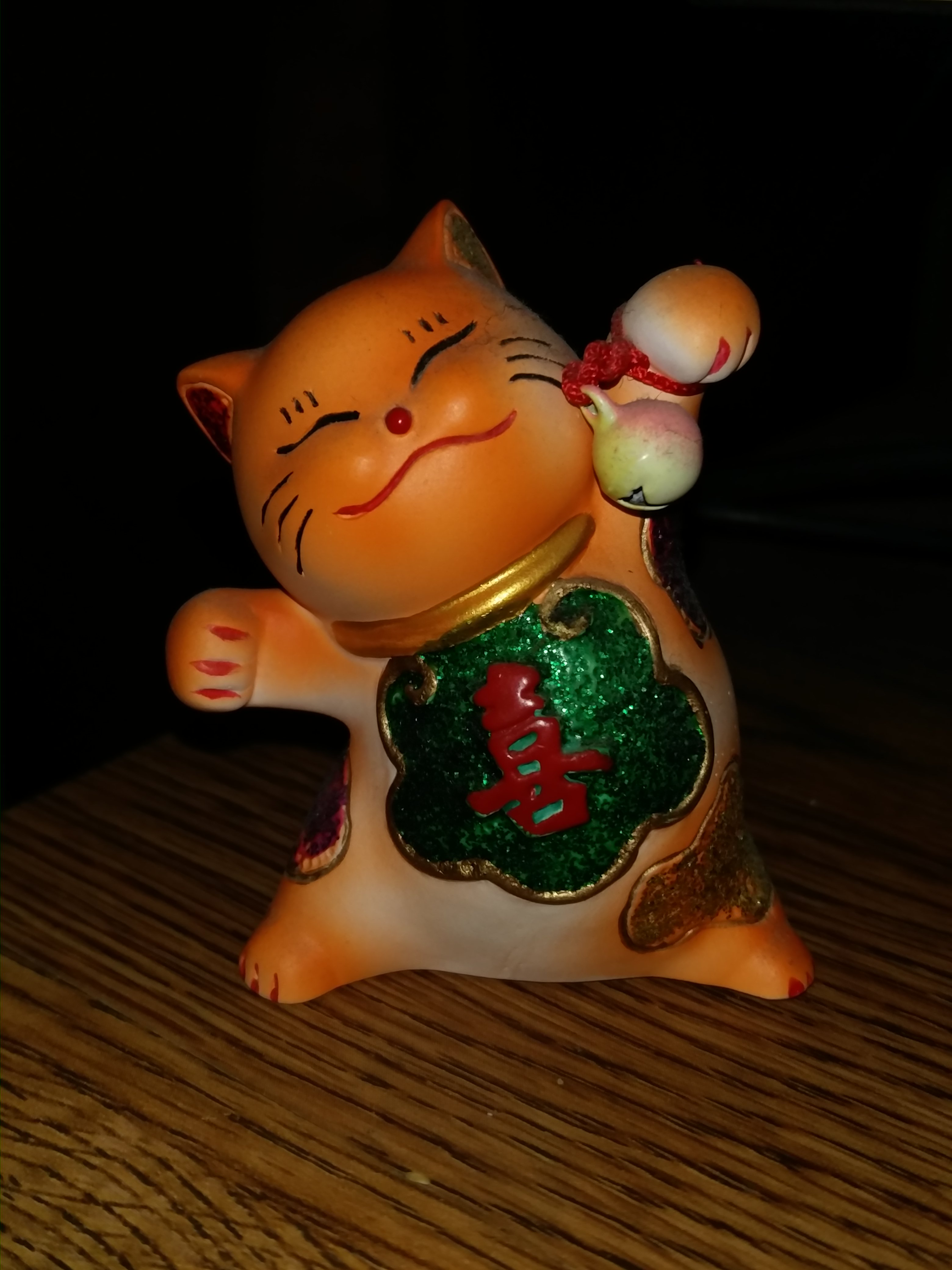

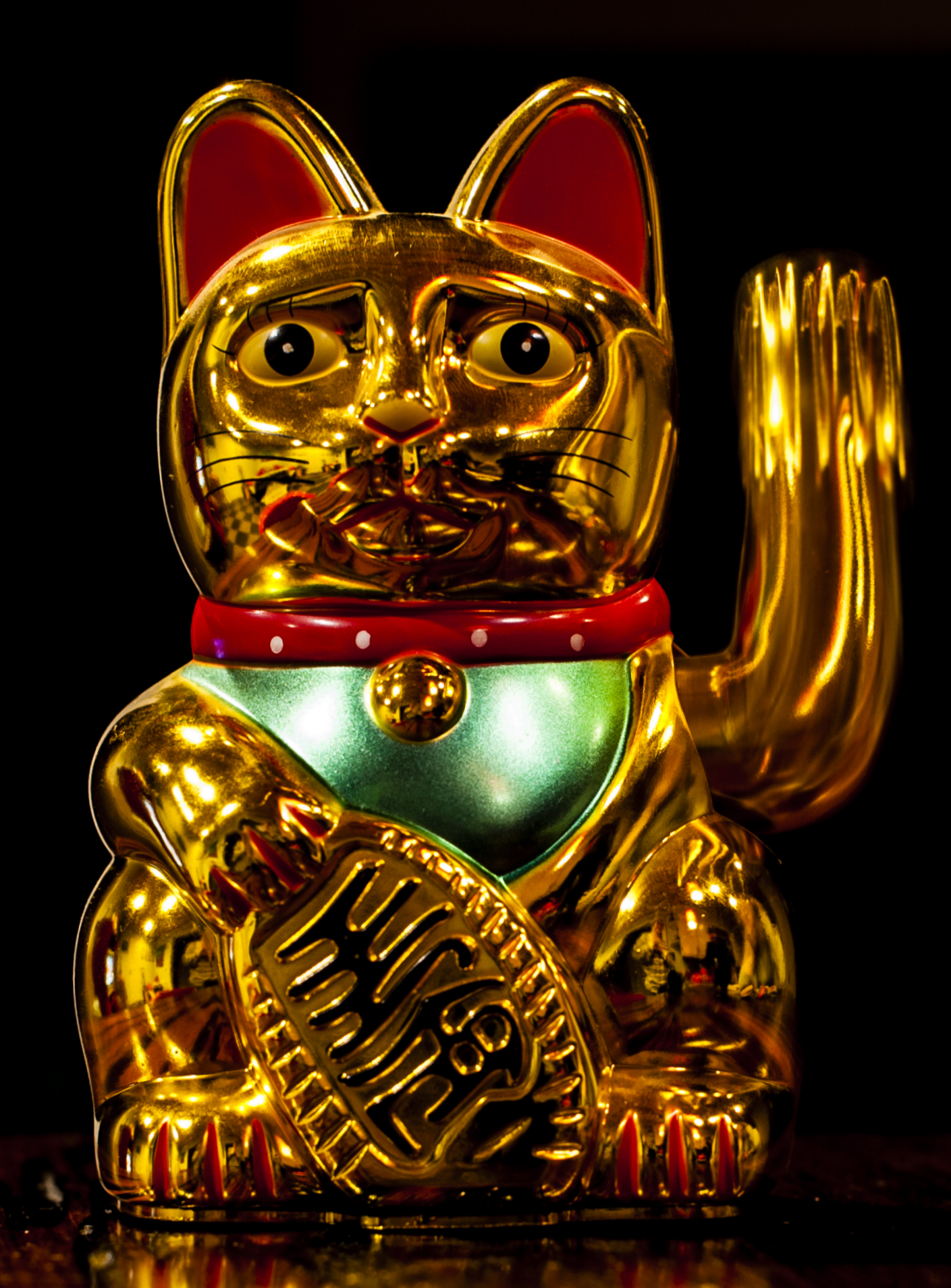

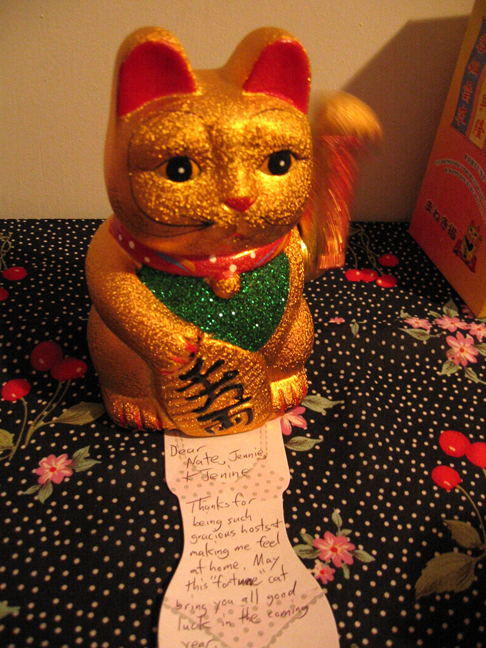

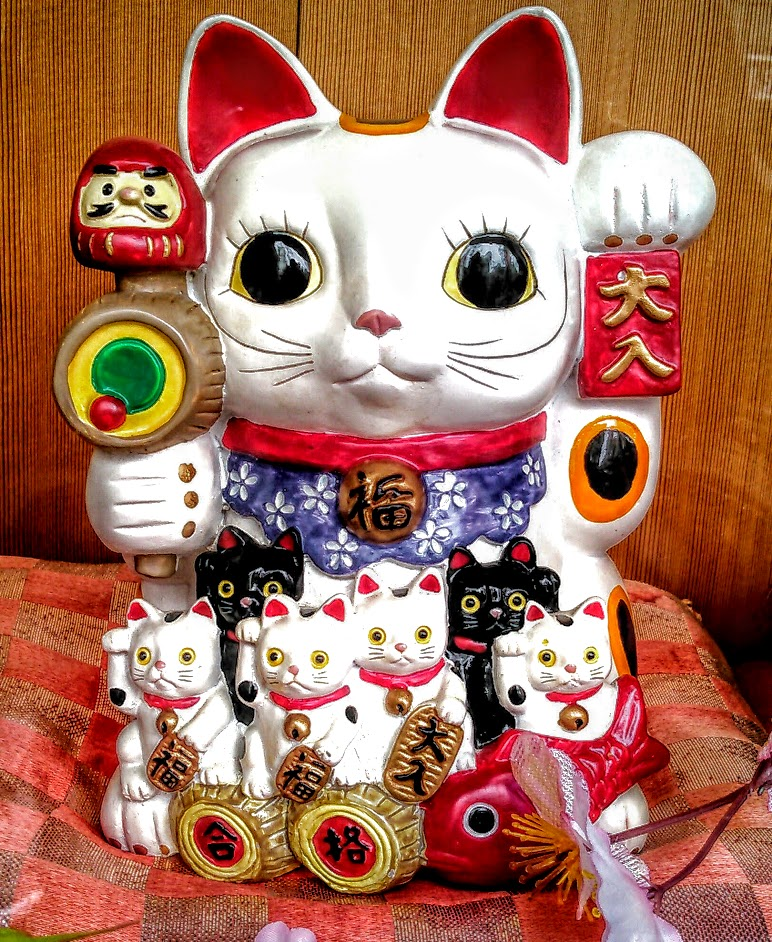

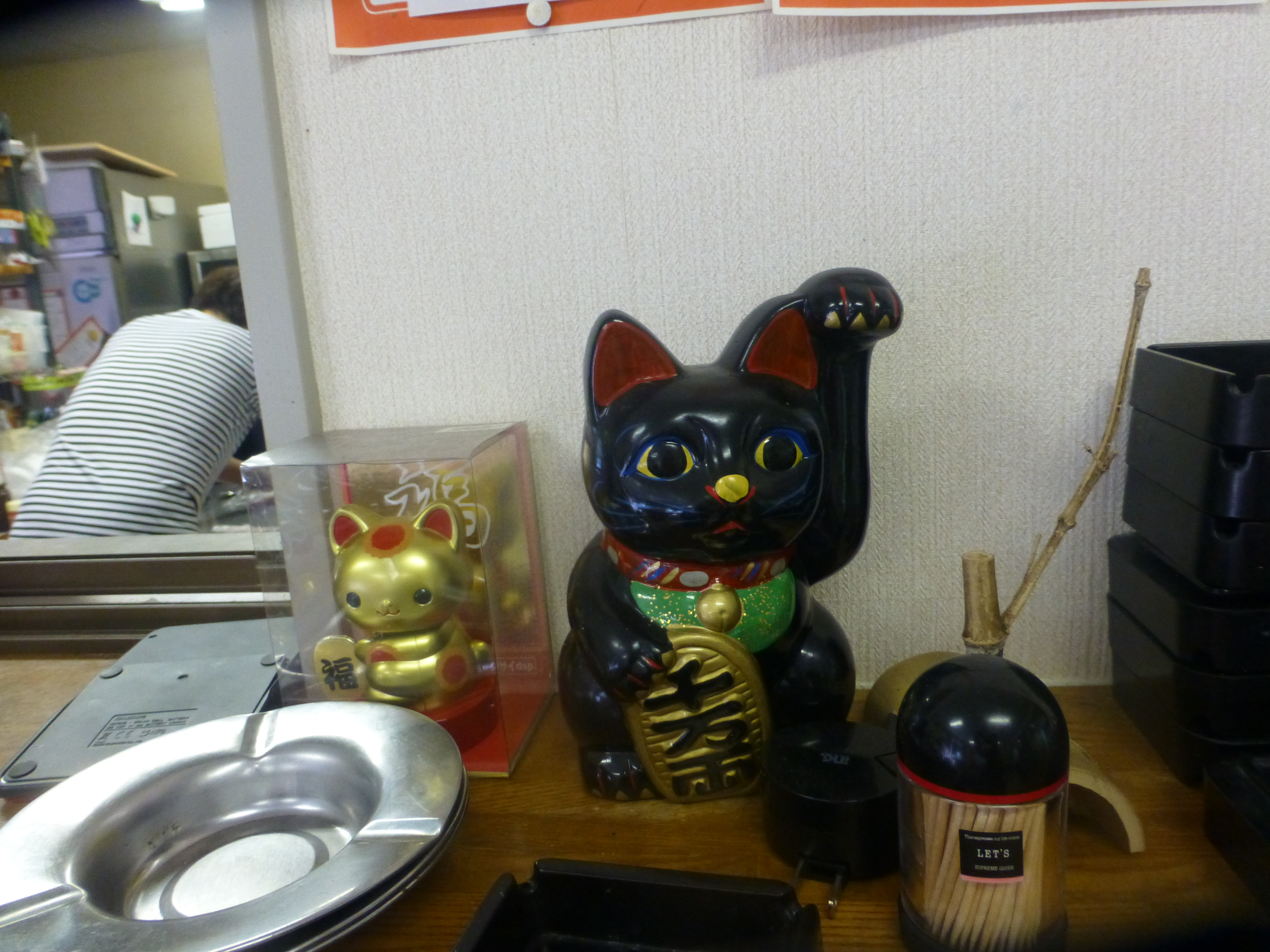

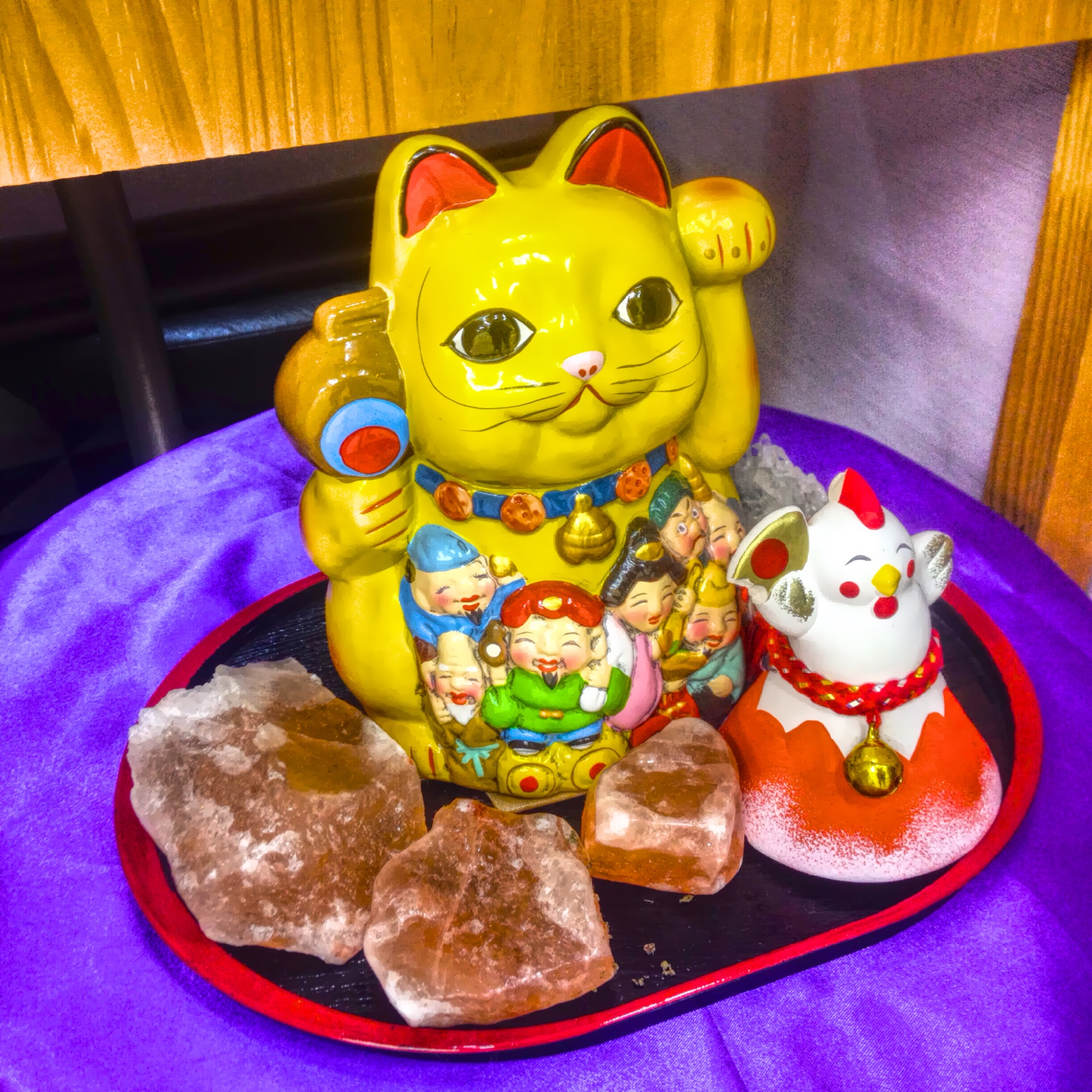

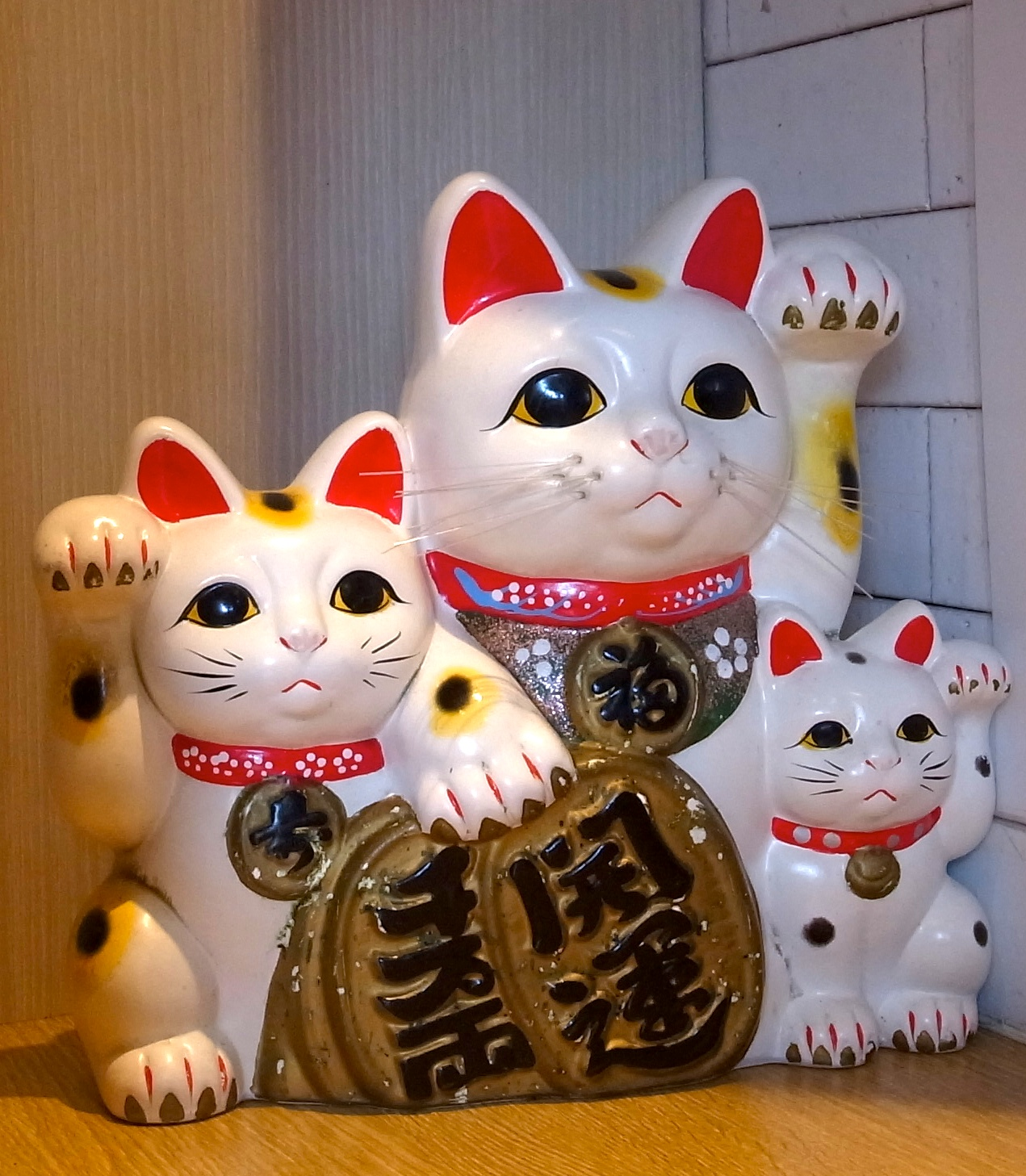

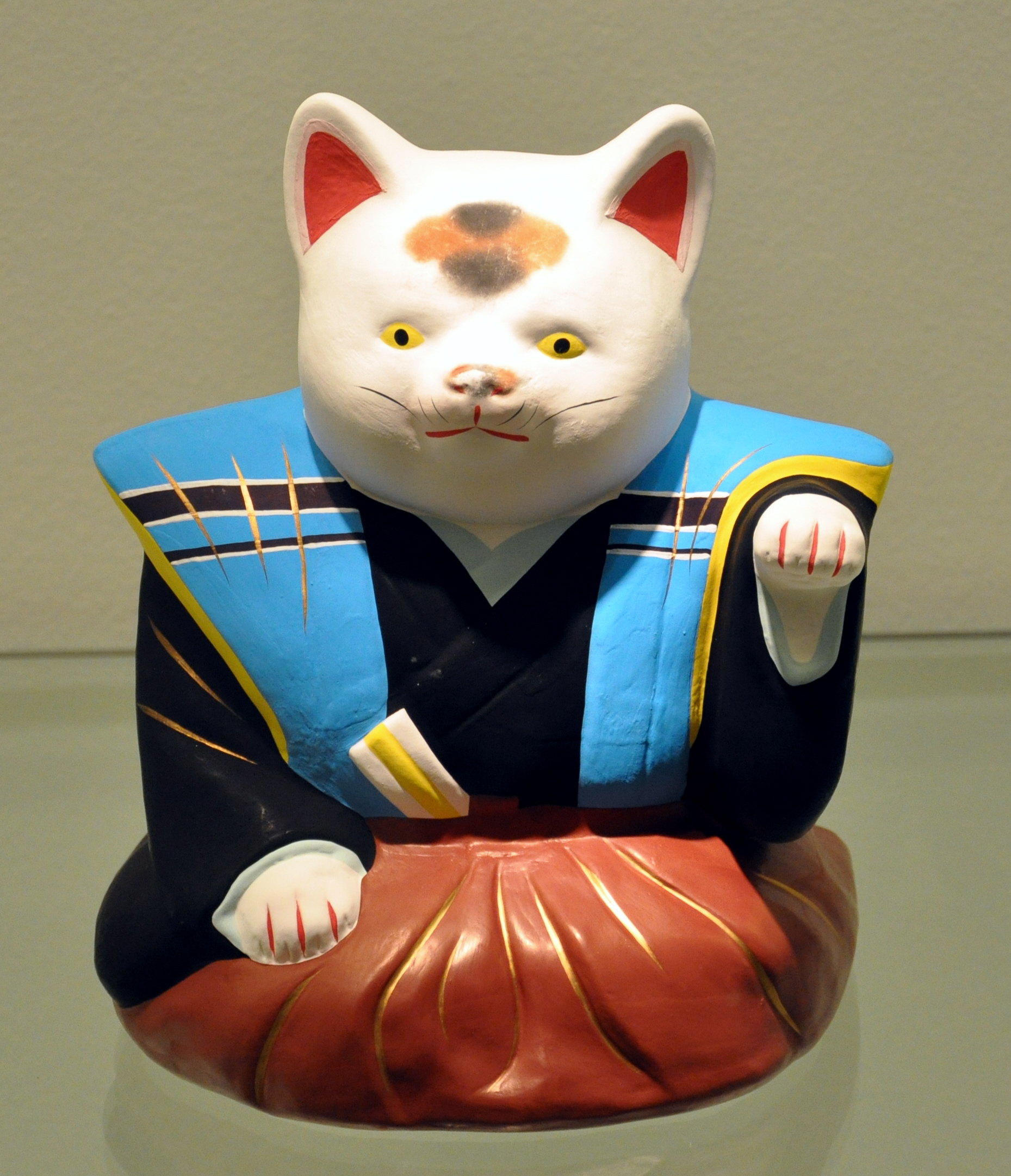

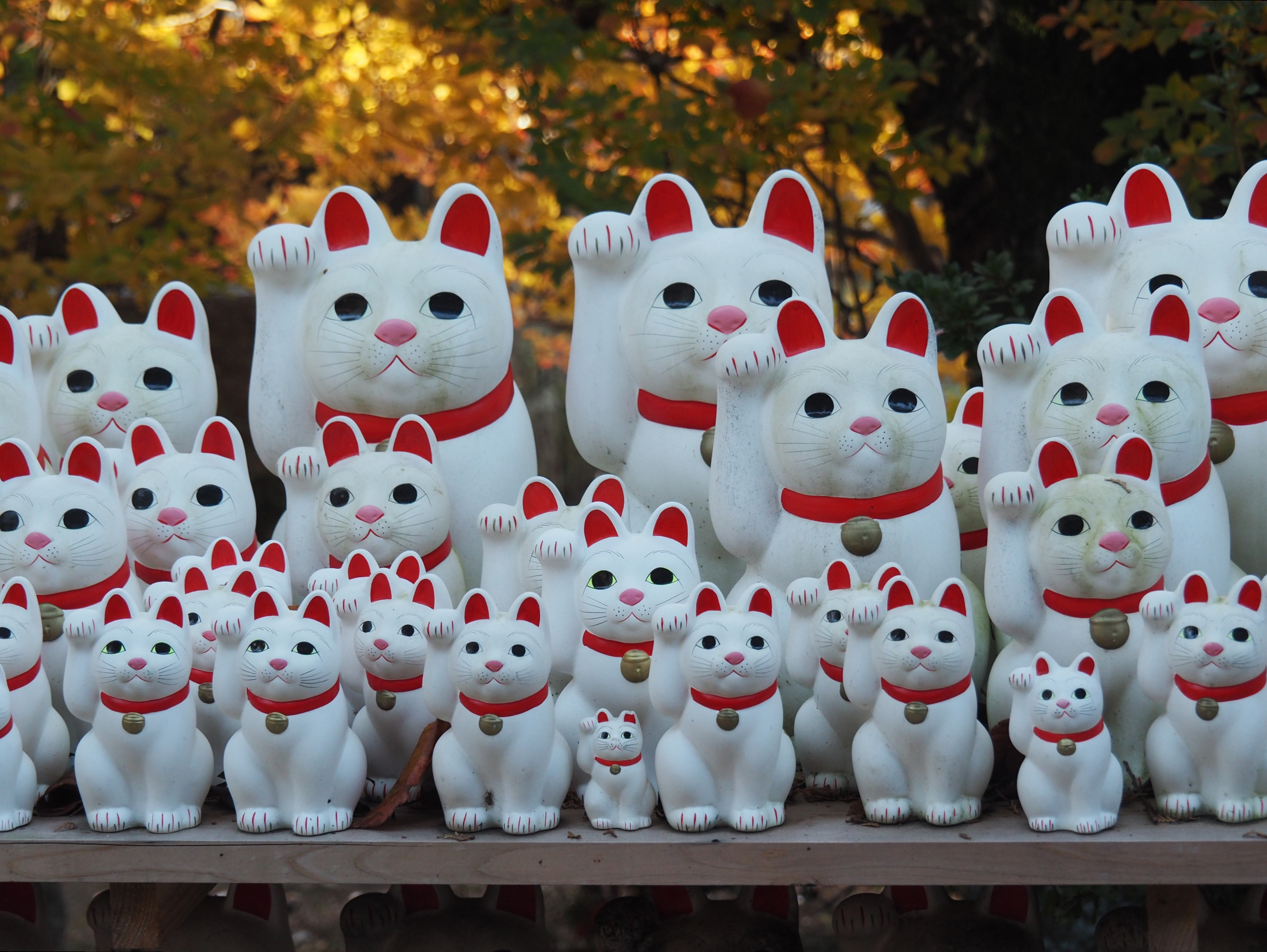

== See also ==
- Bakeneko
- Fukusuke
- Hello Kitty
- Jin Chan
- List of lucky symbols
- Meowth
- Neko-dera
