= 豊原 =

豊原, 豐原 or 丰原, meaning ″abundant field″, may refer to following Asian place names:

- Fengyuan (disambiguation), Chinese transliterated place names
- Toyohara (disambiguation), Japanese transliterated place names
