= Imado doll =

Japanese traditional doll style

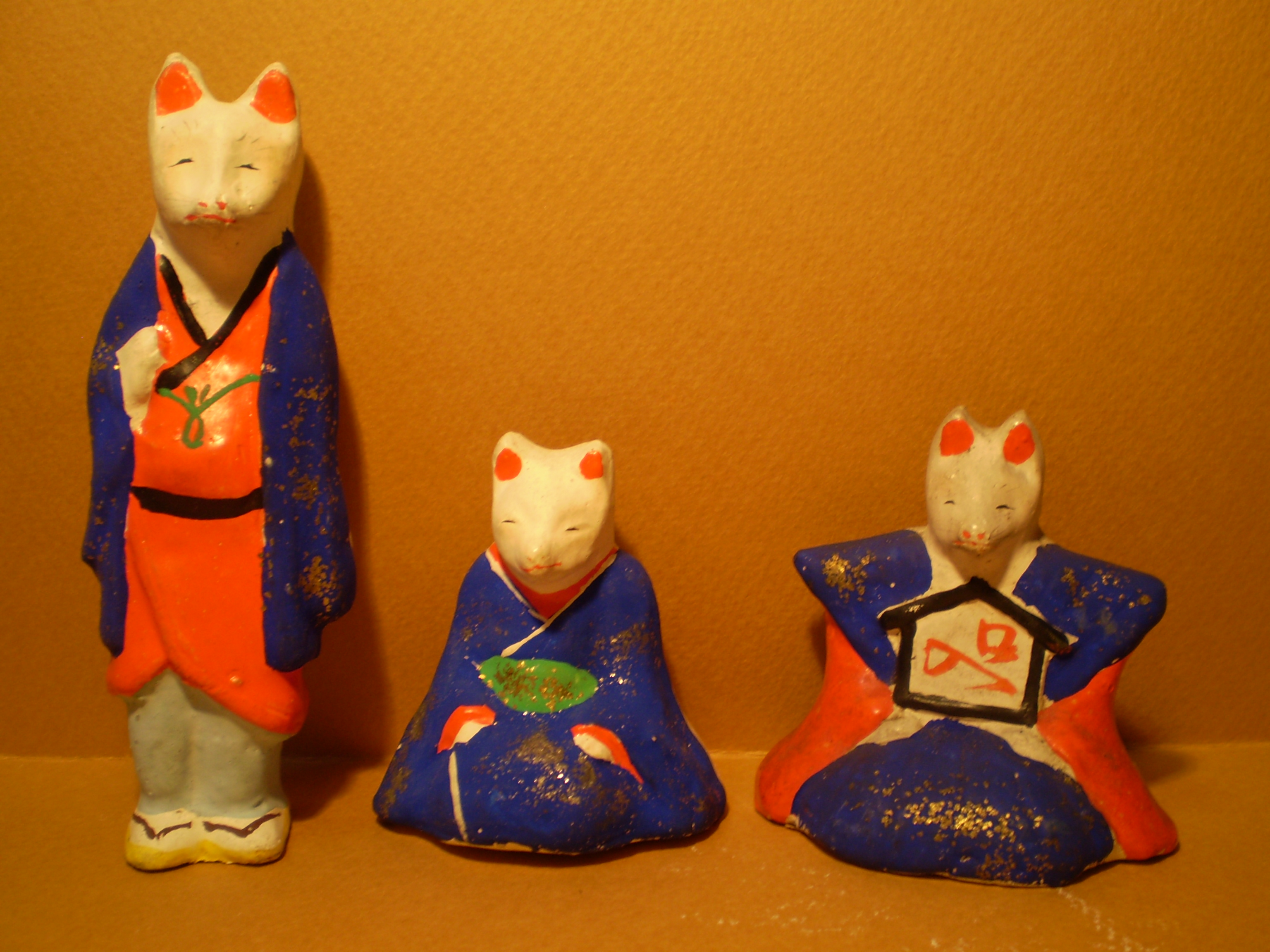
Imado dolls in the shape of kitsune wearing clothes

An Imado doll (今戸人形, Imado Ningyō) is a type of Japanese traditional doll from Imado, today a part of Tokyo. Imado dolls are made from a kind of pottery known as Imado ware. Many different subjects may be depicted but one of the most popular and famous is an anthropomorphic animal, or a variation on the maneki neko, the cat figure which waves its paw to gather prosperity for the residence or business it occupies.
