= Toyohara (surname) =

Toyohara is a Japanese surname.

Notable people with the surname include:

- Toyohara Chikanobu (1838–1912) of the Utagawa school
- Erika Toyohara (豊原 江理佳, born 1996), Japanese actress
- Kōji Toyohara (豊原 浩司, born 1966), Japanese game creator and programmer
- Kōsuke Toyohara (born 1965), Japanese actor and singer
- Toyohara Kunichika (1835–1900), Japanese woodblock print artist
- Satomi Toyohara (born 1982), Taiwanese–Japanese actress and voice actress
- Yumenosuke Toyohara (豊原 夢ノ介), a character in the Japanese stage Miracle☆Stage “Sanrio Boys”: One More Time (ミラクル☆ステージ『サンリオ男子』 ～One More Time～)
