= Toyohara (disambiguation) =

Toyohara was the name of Yuzhno-Sakhalinsk, Sakhalin Oblast, Russia, during its period of Imperial Japanese control.

Toyohara may also refer to:

- Fengyuan District, so called during Imperial Japanese control
- Toyohara (surname)
- Toyohara Station, a station in Nasu, Tochigi Prefecture, Japan
- Toyohara Sub-Prefecture, in Karafuto Fortress
