= Fengyuan =

Fengyuan may refer to:

- Fengyuan (奉元), the capital of Shaanxi Province, Xi'an held a succession of name during Yuan dynasty
- Fengyuan Bus (豐原客運), Taichung City Bus#Operators
- Fengyuan District, Taichung, Taiwan
- Fengyuan Museum of Lacquer Art, a museum about lacquer
- Fengyuan railway station, a railway station on the Taiwan Railways Administration Taichung line
- Fengyuan Subdistrict (逢源街道), Liwan, Guangzhou, Guangdong Province, China
- Fengyuan Town (冯原镇), Chengcheng County, Weinan, Shaanxi Province, China
- Fengyuan Town (丰原镇), Linwei District, Weinan, Shaanxi Province, China
- Fengyuan Township (峰源乡), Liandu, Lishui, Zhejiang Province, China
- Fengyuan Village (凤园村), Fengqi Subdistrict, Luochuan County, Yan'an, Shaanxi Province, China
- Fengyuan Village (豐源里), Pingtung City, Pingtung County, Taiwan

== See also ==
- Feng Yuan, an imperial consort during China's Han Dynasty
