= Imado ware =

Type of Japanese pottery

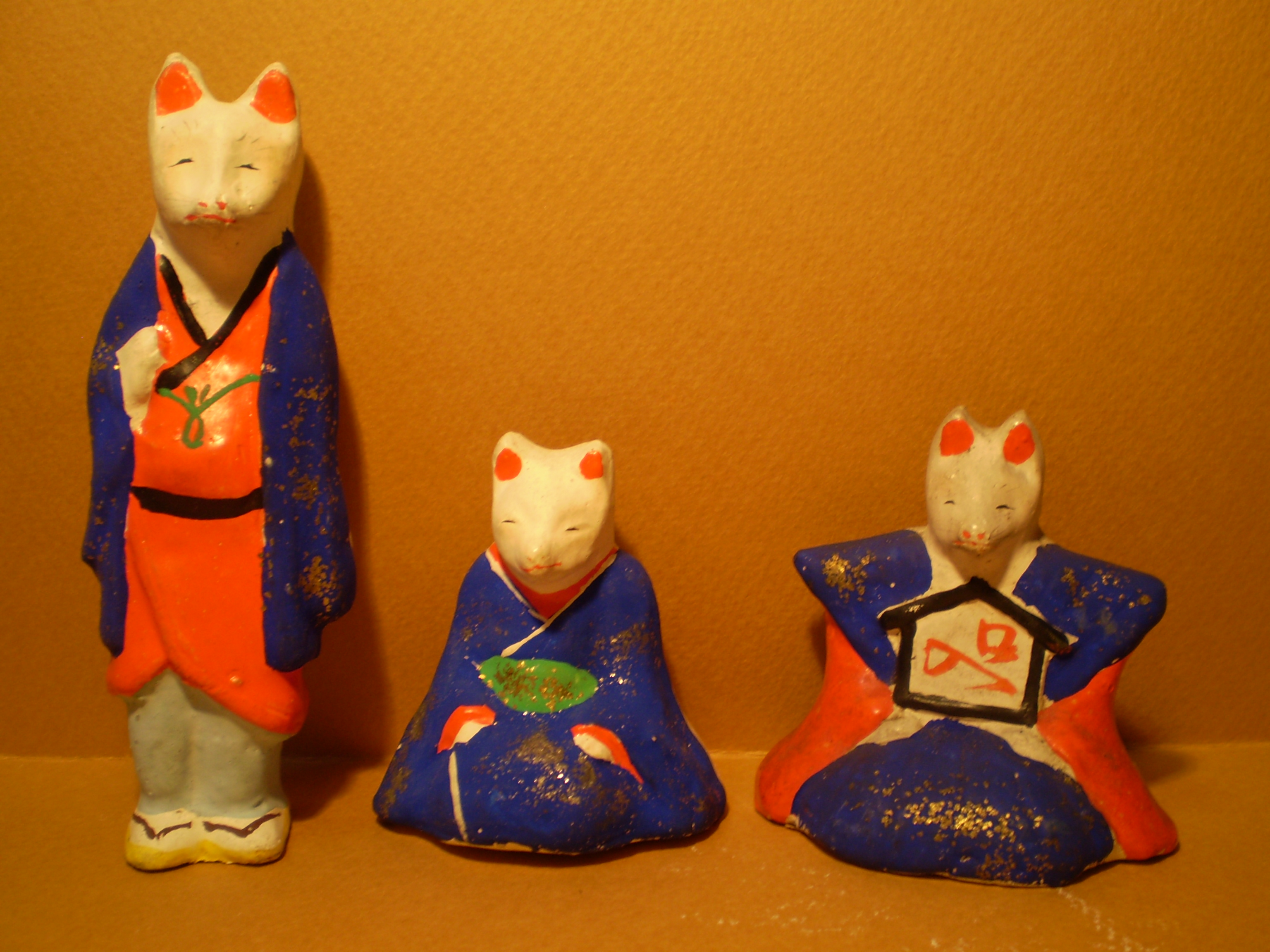
Imado dolls in the shape of kitsune wearing clothes

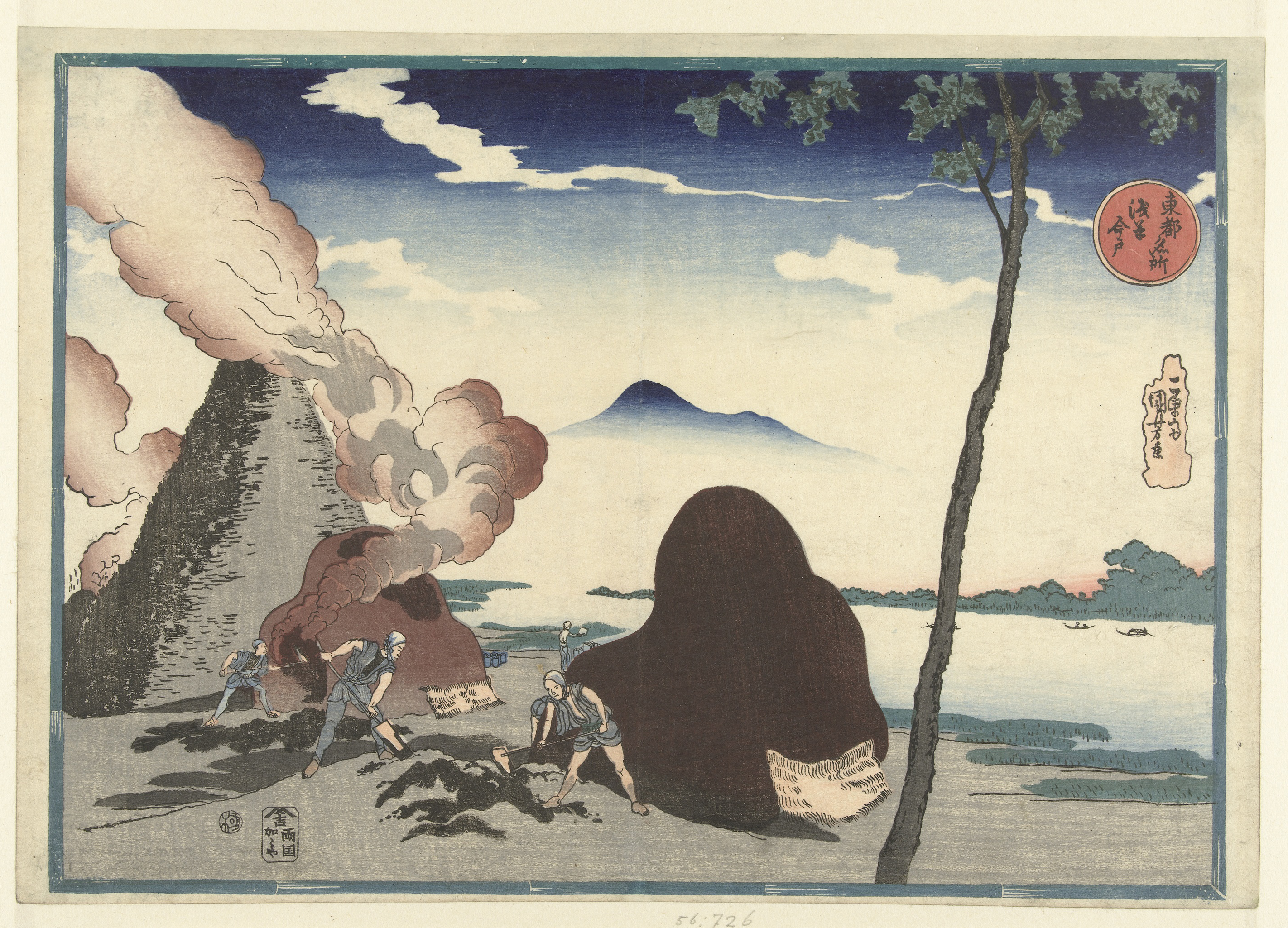
Kilns of Imado along the river in Asakusa, ukiyo-e by Utagawa Kuniyoshi, Edo period, 19th century

Imado ware (今戸焼, Imado-yaki) is a type of Japanese pottery traditionally from Imado, presently a part of Asakusa, Tokyo.
