= Imado =

Former town located in Taitō-ku, Tokyo

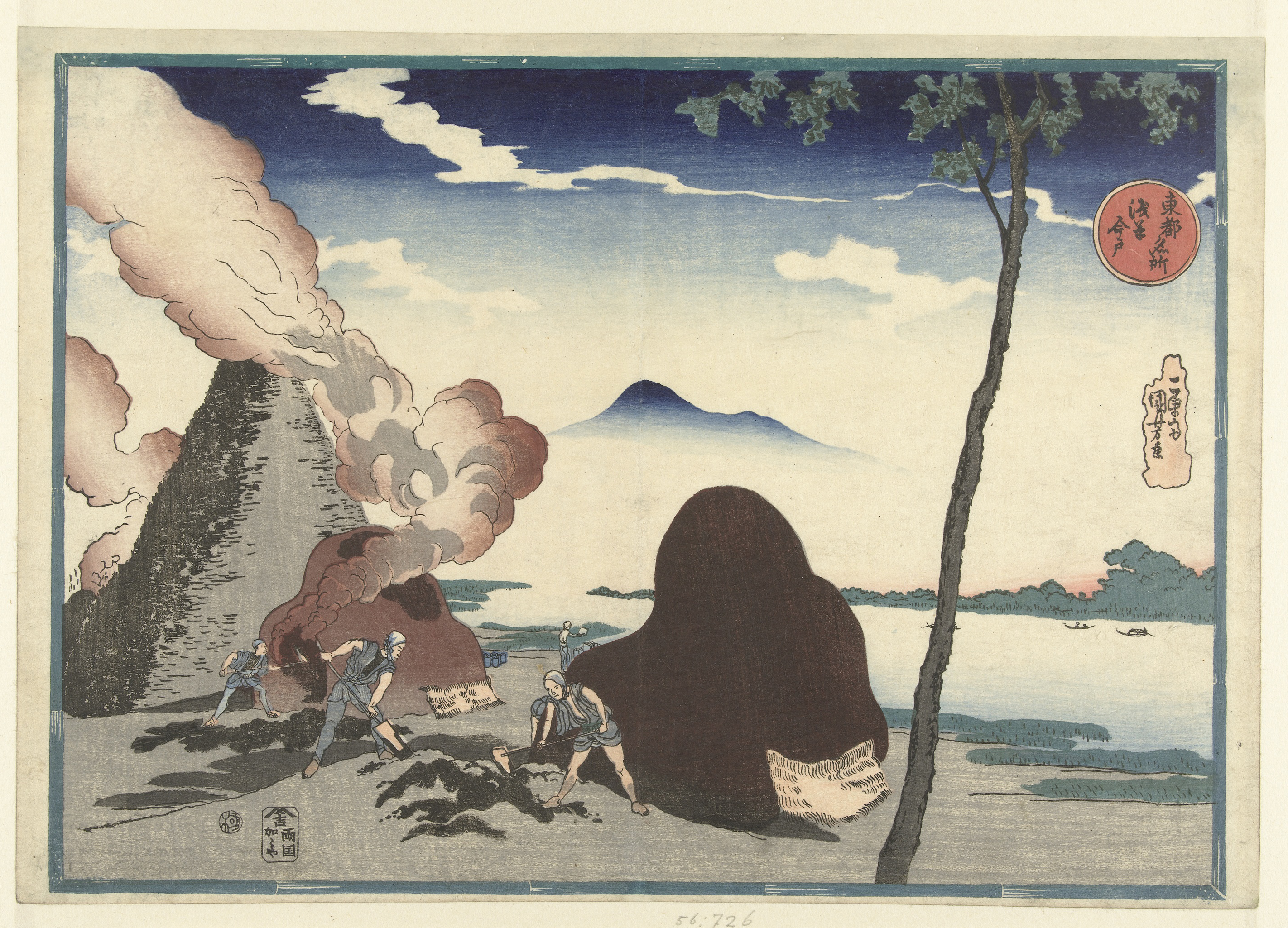
Kilns of Imado along the river in Asakusa, ukiyo-e by Utagawa Kuniyoshi, Edo period, 19th century

Imado (今戸) is a former township located today in Asakusa, eastern Tokyo.

A maneki-neko legend of an old woman takes places in Imado.

Imado dolls come from there. Imado ware also originates from there.
